= Nulls Creek =

Stream in the U.S. state of Missouri

Nulls Creek is a stream in Lincoln County in the U.S. state of Missouri. The stream is a tributary of the North Fork of the Cuivre River.

The stream headwaters arise at 39°07′21″N 91°09′42″W just south of Missouri Route PP and one mile east of the community of Corso at an elevation of approximately 675 feet. The stream flows southeast to its confluence with the North Fork one-half mile northwest of Briscoe at 39°05′19″N 91°01′21″W and an elevation of 479 feet.

Nulls Creek has the name of Jacob Null, a pioneer settler.

== See also ==
- List of rivers of Missouri
