= Gateway Athletic Conference =

High school athletic conference in Missouri, US

The Gateway Athletic Conference is a Missouri State High School Activities Association recognized high school extracurricular league which includes sixteen schools located in the suburbs of St. Louis. The conference is divided into three divisions based on enrollment. The North division includes schools with smaller enrollment, the Central division for medium enrollment schools, and the South division for larger enrollment schools. Schools in the conference are located in St. Charles, Lincoln, Warren, and Franklin counties in Missouri

== List of member schools ==
=== North ===
School	Team Name	Colors	Town	County	Enrollment (2022–23)	Football*	Basketball*	Boys Swim/Dive*	Girls Swim/Dive*
North Point	Grizzlies		Wentzville	St. Charles	1081	Class 4	Class 5	GAC North-Central Class 1	
Orchard Farm	Eagles		St. Charles	St. Charles	633	Class 4	Class 4	N/A	N/A
St. Charles	Pirates		St. Charles	St. Charles	822	Class 4	Class 4	N/A	
St. Charles West	Warriors		St. Charles	St. Charles	634	Class 3	Class 4	N/A	
Warrenton	Warriors		Warrenton	Warren	1010	Class 4	Class 5	N/A	N/A
Winfield	Warriors		Winfield	Lincoln	512	Class 4	Class 4	N/A	N/A

=== Central ===
School	Team Name	Colors	Town	County	Enrollment (2022–23)	Football*	Basketball*	Boys Swim/Dive*	Girls Swim/Dive*
Fort Zumwalt East	Lions		St. Peters	St. Charles	1,235	Class 4	Class 5	GAC North-Central Class 1	
Fort Zumwalt North	Panthers		O'Fallon	St. Charles	1,503	Class 5	Class 6	GAC North-Central Class 1	
Fort Zumwalt South	Bulldogs		St. Peters	St. Charles	1,339	Class 5	Class 5	GAC North-Central Class 1	
Holt	Indians		Wentzville	St. Charles	1,287	Class 5	Class 5	GAC North-Central Class 1	
Liberty	Eagles		Lake St. Louis	St. Charles	1,596	Class 5	Class 6	GAC South Class 1	
Washington	Blue Jays		Washington	Franklin	1,329	Class 5	Class 5	GAC North-Central Class 1	

=== South ===
School	Team Name	Colors	Town	County	Enrollment (2022–23)	Football*	Basketball*	Boys Swim/Dive*	Girls Swim/Dive*
Francis Howell	Vikings		Weldon Spring	St. Charles	1,838	Class 5	Class 6	GAC South Class 2	
Francis Howell Central	Spartans		Cottleville	St. Charles	1,808	Class 5	Class 6	GAC South Class 2	
Francis Howell North	Knights		St. Peters	St. Charles	1,686	Class 5	Class 6	GAC South Class 1	
Fort Zumwalt West	Jaguars		O'Fallon	St. Charles	1,784	Class 5	Class 6	GAC South Class 1	
Timberland	Wolves		Wentzville	St. Charles	1,677	Class 5	Class 6	GAC South Class 1	
Troy Buchanan	Trojans		Troy	Lincoln	2,200	Class 6	Class 6	N/A	N/A

*The class in which a school competes depends on the size of the school, which may be affected by co-op teams with nearby schools, and the particular sport or activity. Most activities (for example, baseball, softball, track, cross country) compete in four classes, but basketball and football competes in six. Swimming & Diving compete in two classes.
