= Missouri Route 147 =

State highway in Missouri, U.S.

Route 147
- MO 147 highlighted in red

Route information
- Maintained by MoDOT
- Length: 2.333 mi (3.755 km)

Major junctions
- South end: Route 47 east of Troy
- North end: Cuivre River State Park

Location
- Country: United States
- State: Missouri

Highway system
- Missouri State Highway System; Interstate; US; State; Supplemental
← Route 146	→ Route 148

Route 147 is a short highway in Lincoln County. Its northern terminus is in Cuivre River State Park, and its southern terminus is at Route 47, east of Troy.

== Route description ==
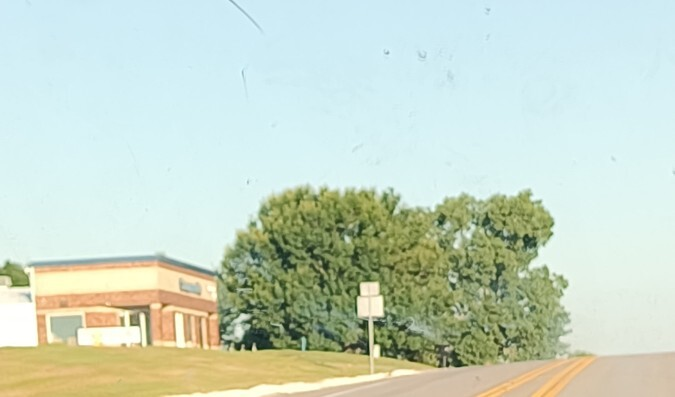
Route 147, near Troy

Route 147 begins at an intersection with Route 47, east of Troy, heading north as a two-lane undivided road. The route heads into forested areas of Cuivre River State Park, curving to the northwest. The road heads to the west and winds through more of the state park. Route 147 comes to its northern terminus at an intersection with Frenchman Bluff Road, where the road continues west as Park Road.

== Major intersections ==
The entire route is in Lincoln County.

Location	mi	km	Destinations	Notes
Troy	0.000	0.000	Route 47	
Cuivre River State Park	2.333	3.755	Frenchman Bluff Road / Park Road	
1.000 mi = 1.609 km; 1.000 km = 0.621 mi
