= Argentville, Missouri =

Unincorporated community in Missouri, U.S.

Coordinates: 39°00′58″N 90°47′53″W

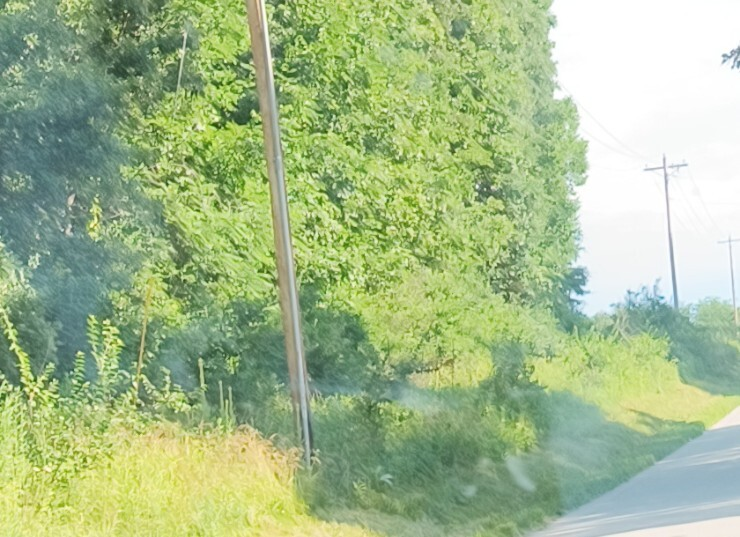
Argentville in 2026

Argentville is an unincorporated community in Lincoln County, in the U.S. state of Missouri.

McLean Creek and Birkhead Branch flow nearby.

== History ==
A post office called Argentville was established in 1879, and remained in operation until 1907. The community has the name of Raleigh Argent, an early settler.

In 1925, Argentville had 32 inhabitants.
