= Lincoln Hills =

Hills in Missouri, U.S.

Coordinates: 39.4°N 91.1°W

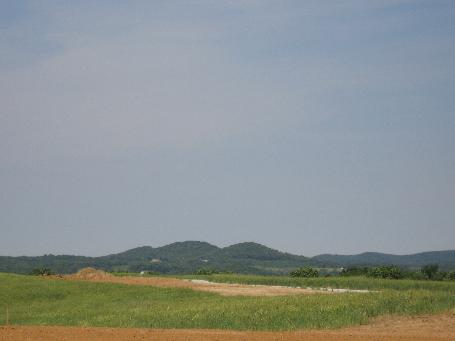
Several 'knobs' in the Lincoln Hills

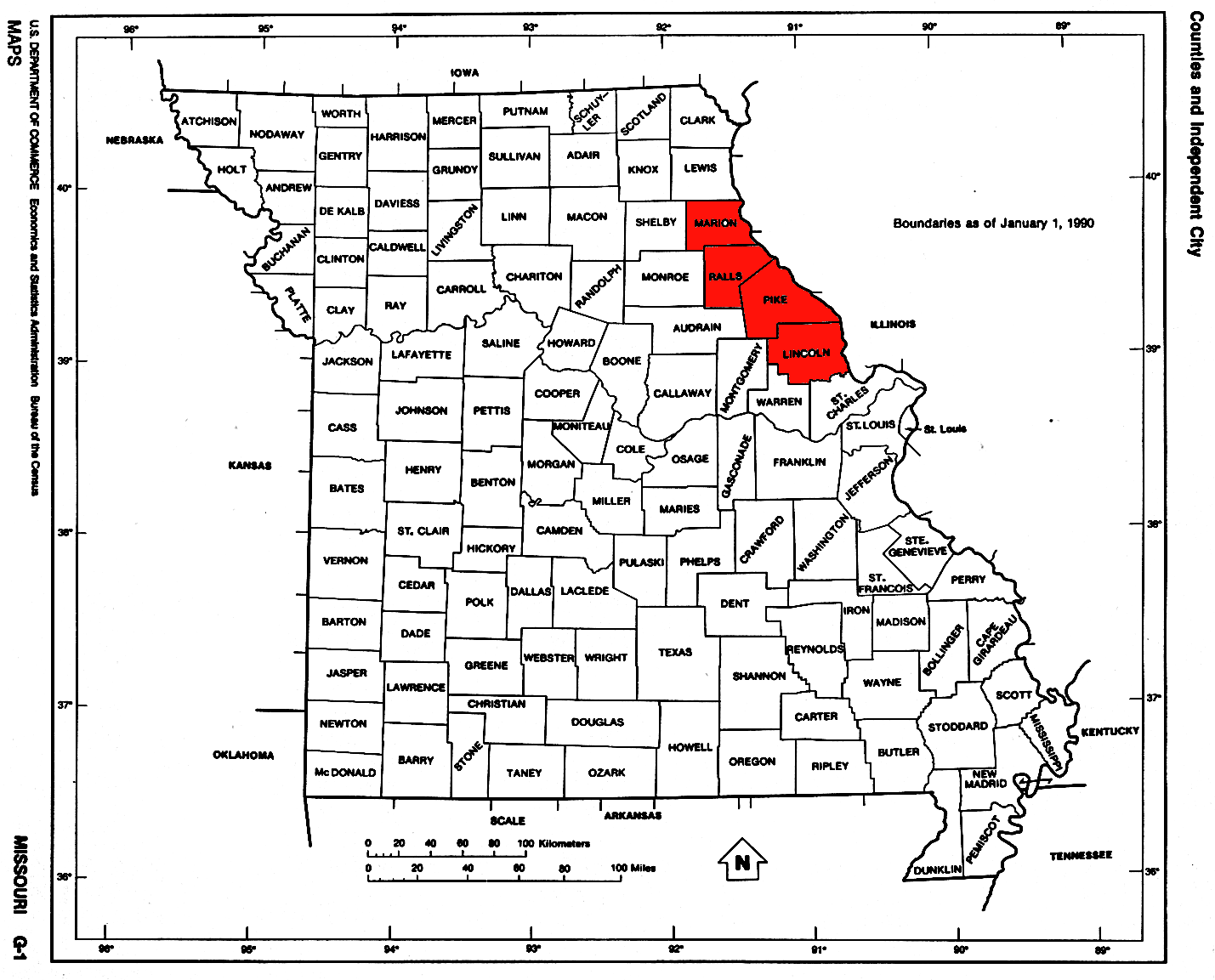
Map of the region

The Lincoln Hills extend along the Mississippi River in Missouri, starting about 40 miles (64 km) northwest of St. Louis and extending to Hannibal. They are located roughly between Highway 61 and Highway 79 in Lincoln, Pike, Ralls and Marion counties. The Lincoln Hills, locally referred to as 'knobs', may have partially escaped the most recent glaciation as nunataks during the Pleistocene. In geology and biology, they more resemble the rugged and forested hills of the Ozarks than the rolling plains of northern Missouri. The limestone bedrock has formed bluffs, glades, caves, springs, and sinkholes. Exposed rocks range in age from Ordovician to Mississippian.

Cuivre River State Park is located within the Lincoln Hills northeast of Troy in Lincoln County.
