= Wayne J. Henke =

American politician (born 1941)

Member of the Missouri House of Representatives
- In office 2003–2007
- Preceded by: Phil Smith
- Succeeded by: Ed Schieffer

Personal details
- Born: May 30, 1941 (age 85)
- Party: Democratic
- Spouse: Dottie Prinster
- Children: 9
- Education: University of Missouri (BA)
- Occupation: High school teacher and coach, farmer, politician

Wayne J. Henke (born May 30, 1941) is a former high school teacher and coach, a retired farmer, and a former politician. He served as a Democrat in the Missouri House of Representatives. He lives in Troy, Missouri, with his wife, the former Dottie Prinster, and has nine children, twenty-one grandchildren, and five great-grandchildren.

== Biography ==
Henke was born in Chesterfield, Missouri, later moving and graduating from the Lincoln County R-IV High School. He received his bachelor's degree in education from University of Missouri. He was a member of the Missouri Tigers baseball team in 1964. He went on to become a high school math, health, and physical education teacher and a coach for ten years. He coached baseball, basketball, and track at Winfield High School from 1965 to 1970 and coached basketball and track at Fort Zumwalt High School from 1970 to 1975.

Henke served in the United States Army Reserves from 1962 to 1970 and saw six months of active duty. In 1986, he was elected the Lincoln County Assessor. He has also served on the Silex R-1 School Board. He was appointed to the Missouri Ethics Commission by Governor Eric Greitens from 2019-2023.

Henke is a member of Sacred Heart Catholic Church, the Knights of Columbus, the Farm Bureau, the Lincoln County Fair Board (serving as chair in 1978), the Lincoln County Memorial Hospital Advisory Board (serving as chair in 1995), and the Lincoln County Democratic Club. He has been recognized for his work by inclusion in Winfield, Missouri's R-IV Wall of Fame and the St. Charles County Amateur Baseball Hall of Fame.

Henke was first elected to the Missouri House of Representatives in 2002, winning reelection in 2004. In 2006, he ran for the Missouri Senate, losing to Scott Rupp. During his tenure in the House, he served on the following committees:

- Appropriations - Agriculture and Natural Resources;
- Health Care Policy;
- Transportation;
- Joint Committee on Transportation Oversight;
- Joint Committee on Wetlands;
- Joint Interim Committee on Intermodal Transportation;
- Special Committee on Immigration Reform;
- Interim Committee on Health Care Access and Affordability; and
- Interim Committee on Transportation.
