= Sterling Landing, Missouri =

Extinct hamlet in Missouri, U.S.

Coordinates: 39°06′47″N 90°41′39″W

Sterling Landing (also called Sterling) is an extinct town in Lincoln County, in the U.S. state of Missouri. The GNIS classifies it as a populated place.

Sterling Landing was platted in 1836 and named after a riverboat captain.
