= Mashek, Missouri =

Extinct hamlet in Missouri, U.S.

Coordinates: 39°00′15″N 91°04′34″W

Mashek (/ˈmɑːʃək/ MAH-shək) is an extinct town in Lincoln County, in the U.S. state of Missouri.

A post office called Mashek was established in 1888, and remained in operation until 1905. The community has the name of John Mashek, an early settler. It was a Bohemian settlement in the west-central part of the Bedford Township.
