= Cuivre River =

River in Missouri, U.S.

Cuivre River Buffalo River, Copper River, Cuvier River, Quiver River, Quivre River
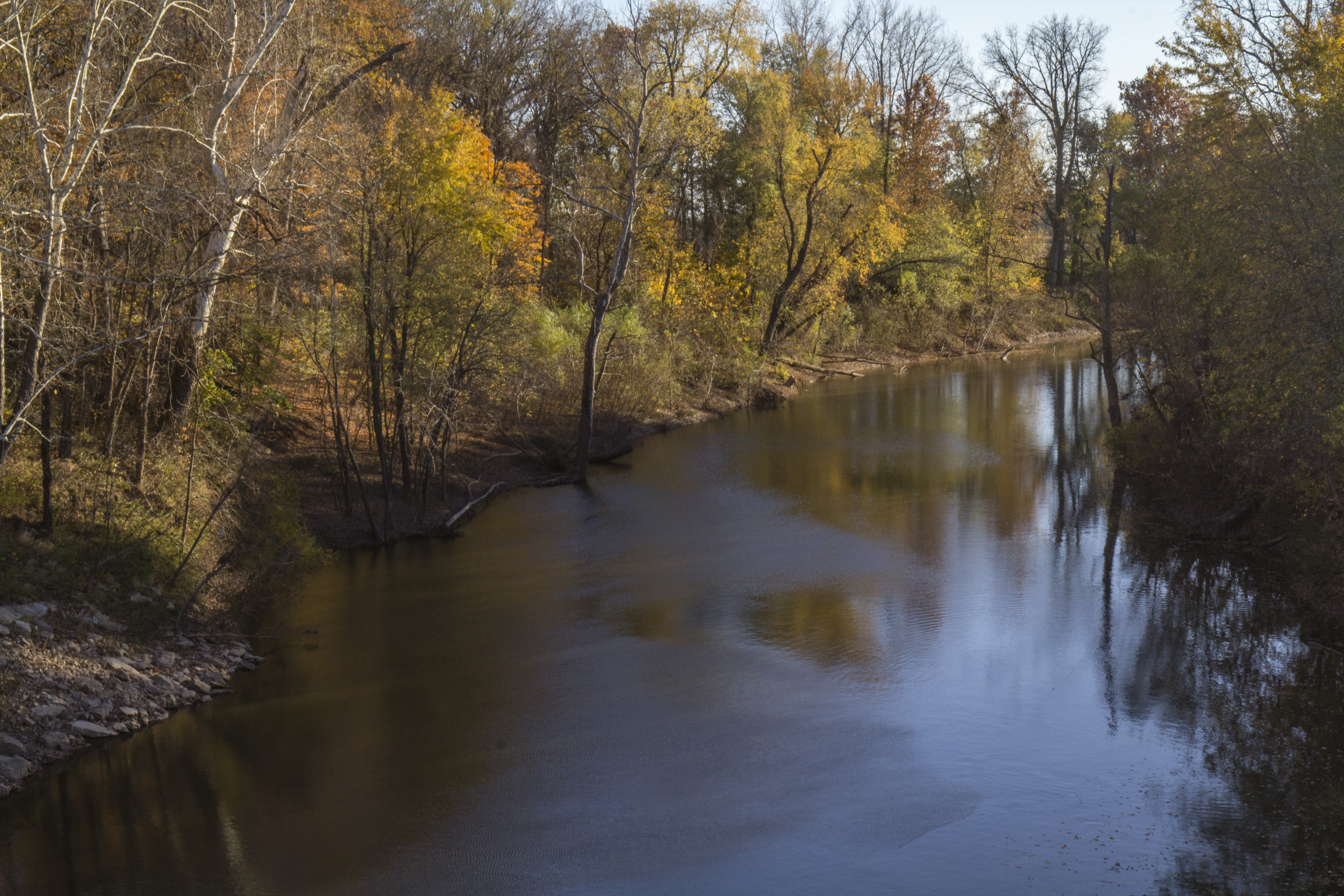
- Etymology: Georges Cuvier
- Native name: Rivière aux Boeufs (French)

Location
- Country: United States
- State: Missouri
- Region: Lincoln and St. Charles Counties
- Cities and village: Troy, Moscow Mills, Chain of Rocks, Old Monroe

Physical characteristics
- Source: Confluence of North Fork and West Fork
  - coordinates: 39°01′02″N 90°59′34″W
  - elevation: 470 feet (140 m)
- Mouth: Mississippi River
  - coordinates: 38°56′00″N 90°41′13″W
  - elevation: 423 feet (129 m)
- Length: 41.6 mi (66.9 km)

Basin features
- Landmarks: Cuivre River State Park
- Tributaries
  - left: Lead Creek, Keelstone Branch
  - right: Whitcomb Branch, Big Creek

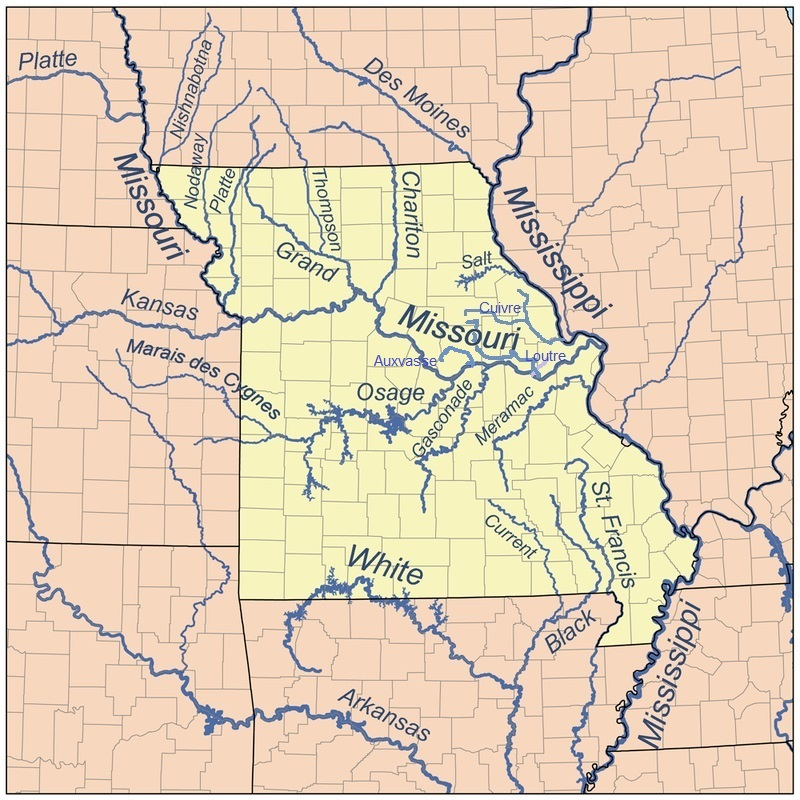
Map of Missouri rivers, including Cuivre River

The Cuivre River (/ˈkwɪvər/ KWIV-ər) is a 41.6-mile-long (66.9 km) river in the east central part of the state of Missouri, north of the Missouri River terminus. A good part of its course marks the borders between Lincoln and St. Charles counties before emptying into the Mississippi River north of St. Louis. The Cuivre River State Park near Troy has its southwestern borders on the river. The river is considered a navigable stream by the Missouri water patrol.

== Path ==
The stream headwaters are the North and West forks which merge just west of US Route 61 about three miles northwest of Troy at 39°01′02″N 90°59′34″W and an elevation of 470 feet. The stream flows east crossing under Route 61 and then turns southeast passing under Missouri Route 47 two miles east of Troy. The stream meanders to the southeast passing under Missouri Route C just east of Moscow Mills. The stream continues to the southeast until reaching the Lincoln-St. Charles county line where it gains the major tributary of Big Creek. The stream turns east and forms the Lincoln-St. Charles county line. The stream flows northeast passing south of Chain of Rocks and crosses under Missouri Route 79 southwest of Old Monroe. The stream meanders east to meet the Mississippi at Cuivre Slough which is part of the Mississippi River west of Cuiver Island. The confluence is at 38°56′00″N 90°41′13″W at an elevation of 423 feet. At Troy, the river has a mean annual discharge of 699 cubic feet per second.

== Name ==
The Cuivre River received its name from French-speaking settlers in French Louisiana. The name means "copper", though none is present along the river, and it is thought to have been named after Baron Georges Cuvier, a French naturalist and paleontologist, who was first to do comparative anatomy and the classification of animals and fossils. When France acquired the territory west of the Mississippi River, Cuvier sent two of his students to America to get specimens of flora and fauna and to assess the climate and topography of the new acquisition. When the young men reached the river in what is now the Lincoln County area, it was known to the local French as Rivière aux Boeufs because of the numerous bison roaming its banks. The two scientists decided a more impressive name for the stream would be "Cuvier", and labeled it such on their maps. When the English-speaking settlers arrived, the spelling was changed to "Cuivre" and the pronunciation anglicized to "Quiver".

Variant names for the stream include Buffaloe River, Copper River, Cuvier River, La Quevr, Queevere River, Quiver River, Quivre River, Riviere au Boeuf, Riviere au Cuivre, Riviere aux Boeuf, and Riviere aux Cuivre.

== History ==
The Battle of the Sink Hole was fought near the mouth of the Cuivre at the end of the War of 1812. The Cuivre River State Park was established in the 1930s.
