= John McKeon (disambiguation) =

John McKeon may refer to:

- John McKeon (1808–1883), American lawyer and New York United States Representative
- John F. McKeon (born 1958), American politician, New Jersey state legislature, 27th district
- John M. McKeon (1882–1939), American politician, Missouri senator
- Jack McKeon (born 1930), Major League Baseball manager
