= Senator Watson =

Senator Watson may refer to:

== Members of the United States Senate ==
- Clarence Wayland Watson (1864–1940), U.S. Senator from West Virginia from 1911 to 1913
- James Eli Watson (1864–1948), U.S. Senator from Indiana from 1916 to 1933
- James Watson (New York politician) (1750–1806), U.S. Senator from New York from 1798 to 1800
- Thomas E. Watson (1856–1922), U.S. Senator from Georgia from 1921 to 1922

== United States state senate members ==
- Ben Watson (politician) (born 1959), Georgia State Senate
- Bo Watson (born 1960), Tennessee State Senate
- Clinton Watson (1888–1958), Missouri State Senate
- Diane Watson (born 1933), California State Senate
- Frank Watson (American politician) (born 1945), Illinois State Senate
- James F. Watson (1840–1897), Oregon State Senate
- James Lopez Watson (1922–2001), New York State Senate
- John H. Watson (Vermont judge) (1851–1929), Vermont State Senate
- Kirk Watson (born 1958), Texas State Senate
- Michael Watson (Mississippi politician) (born 1977), Mississippi State Senate
- Murray Watson Jr. (1932–2018), Texas State Senate
- Thomas Philip Watson (1933–2015), Oklahoma State Senate
- William T. Watson (1849–1917), Delaware State Senate

== Other ==
- John William Clark Watson (1808-1890), Confederate States Senator from Mississippi from 1864 to 1865
