= Ethlyn =

Ethlyn may refer to:

- Ethlyn T. Clough (1858–1936), American newspaper publisher, editor
- Ethlyn Smith (1940-2007), civil servant from the British Virgin Islands
- Ethlyn Tate (born 1966), Jamaican sprinter
- Ethlyn, Missouri, United States, an unincorporated community
