= Old Rock House (Moscow Mills, Missouri) =

Historic house in Missouri, United States

- U.S. National Register of Historic Places
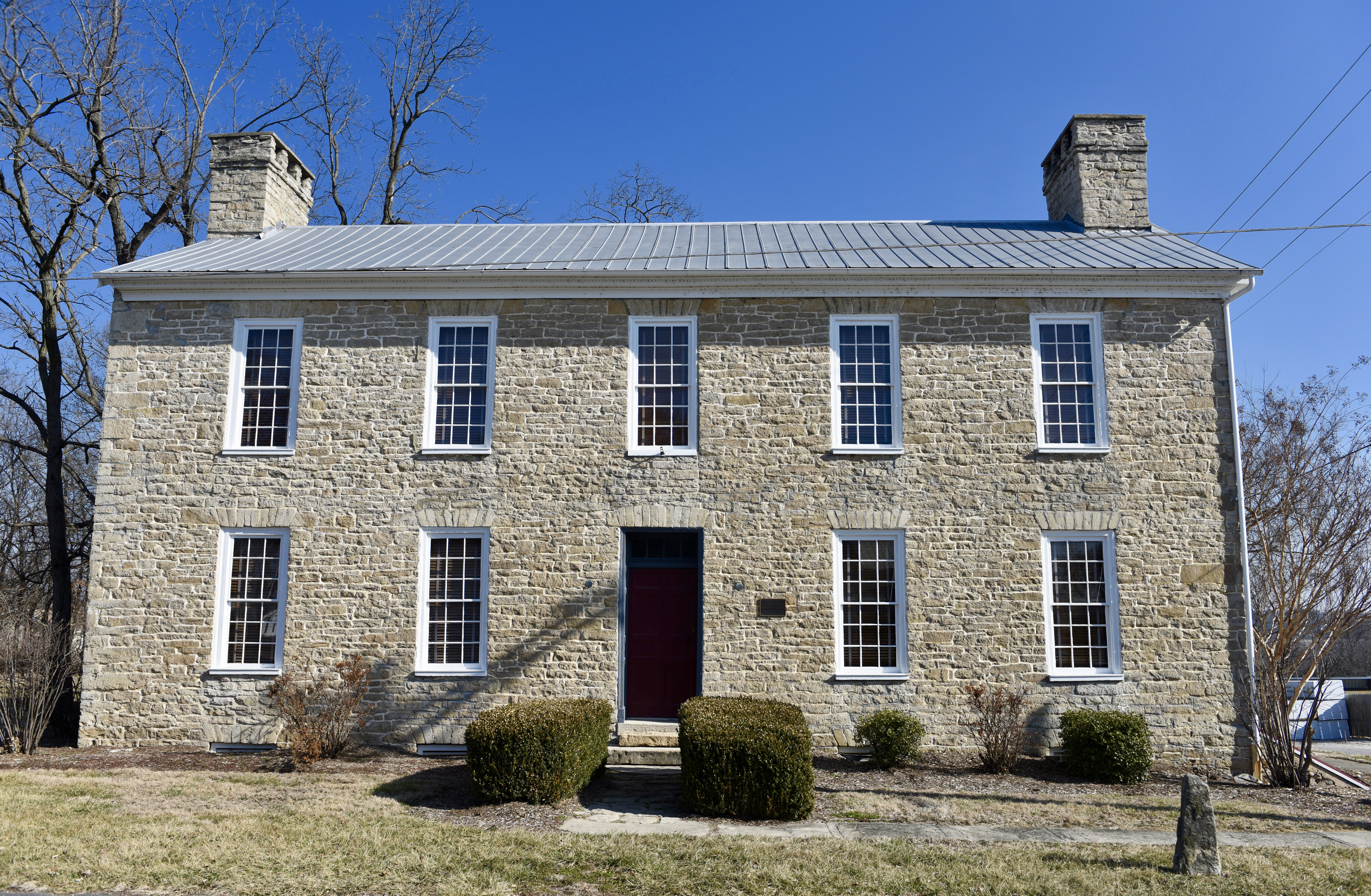

- Location within Missouri Location within the United States
- Location: 2nd and Mill Sts. Moscow Mills, Missouri
- Coordinates: 38°56′57″N 90°54′53″W
- Built: 1818
- Architect: Ross, Shapley
- Architectural style: Classical Revival
- NRHP reference No.: 72000721
- Added to NRHP: October 18, 1972

Old Rock House, also known as Shapley Ross House, is a historic home located at Moscow Mills, Lincoln County, Missouri. It was built between about 1818 and 1821, and is a two-story, five-bay, Classical Revival style squared rubble limestone dwelling, with a two-story rear ell added about 1870. The house measures 56 feet, 6 inches, wide and 46 feet, 3 1/2 inches, deep.

It was listed on the National Register of Historic Places in 1972.
