= TBHS =

TBHS can stand for:

- Timaru Boys' High School, Canterbury, New Zealand
- Todd Beamer High School, Washington, the United States
- Troy Buchanan High School, Troy, Missouri, the United States
