= Senator Williams =

Senator Williams may refer to:

== Members of the United States Senate ==
- Abram Williams (1832–1911), U.S. Senator from California
- George Henry Williams (1823–1910), U.S. Senator from Oregon from 1865 to 1871
- George Howard Williams (1871–1963), U.S. Senator from Missouri from 1925 to 1926
- Harrison A. Williams (1919–2001), U.S. Senator from New Jersey from 1959 to 1982
- Jared W. Williams (1796–1864), U.S. Senator from New Hampshire
- Reuel Williams (1783–1862), U.S. Senator from Maine
- John J. Williams (politician) (1904–1988), U.S. senator from Delaware from 1947 to 1970
- John Sharp Williams (1854–1932), U.S. Senator from Mississippi from 1911 to 1923
- John Stuart Williams (1818–1898), U.S. Senator from Kentucky
- John Williams (Tennessee politician) (1778–1837), U.S. Senator from Tennessee from 1815 to 1823
- Thomas Hickman Williams (1801–1851), U.S. Senator from Mississippi
- Thomas Hill Williams (1780–1840), U.S. Senator from Mississippi

== United States state senate members ==
- Abraham J. Williams (1781–1839), Missouri State Senate
- Alexander B. Williams (1815–?), New York State Senate
- Angela Williams (politician), Colorado State Senate
- Anthony H. Williams (born 1957), Pennsylvania State Senate
- Archibald Williams (judge) (1801–1863), Kansas State Senate
- Avon Williams (1921–1993), Tennessee State Senate
- Benjamin Williams (Vermont politician) (1876–1957), Vermont State Senate
- Benjamin Williams (1751–1814), North Carolina State Senate
- Bob Williams (West Virginia politician) (born 1951), West Virginia State Senate
- Brian Williams (Missouri politician) (born 1983), Missouri State Senate
- Carol Williams (politician) (born 1949), Montana State Senate
- Charles Williams (Florida politician) (born 1939), Florida State Senate
- Charles G. Williams (1829–1892), Wisconsin State Senate
- Charles Williams (Wisconsin state legislator) (1844–1922), State Senate
- Constance H. Williams (born 1944), Pennsylvania State Senate
- Dale C. Williams (died 1955), California State Senate
- David L. Williams (politician) (born 1953), Kentucky State Senate
- David Rogerson Williams (1776–1830), South Carolina State Senate
- Derwood Williams (1889–1973), Missouri State Senate
- Donald E. Williams Jr. (born 1957), Connecticut State Senate
- Eddie Joe Williams (born 1954), Arkansas State Senate
- Gardner D. Williams (1804–1858), Michigan State Senate
- George Williams (Michigan politician) (1869–1934), Michigan State Senate
- Glen Morgan Williams (1920–2012), Virginia State Senate
- Guinn Williams (1871–1948), Texas State Senate
- Hardy Williams (1931–2010), Pennsylvania State Senate
- Henry D. Williams (1893–1934), New York State Senate
- Henry Williams (Massachusetts politician) (1805–1887), Massachusetts State Senate
- Hezekiah Williams (1798–1856), Maine State Senate
- Hosea Williams (1926–2000), Georgia State Senate
- Jack W. Williams (politician) (fl. 2010s), Alabama State Senate
- James D. Williams (1808–1880), Indiana State Senate
- James M. Williams (1850–1909), Ohio State Senate
- James Williams (Delaware politician) (1825–1899), Delaware State Senate
- Jim Williams (politician) (1926–2016), Florida State Senate
- John F. Williams (American politician) (1885–1963), New York State Senate
- John M. S. Williams (1818–1886), Massachusetts State Senate
- John Williams (Caswell County, North Carolina) (1740–1804), North Carolina State Senate
- John Williams (Salem, New York) (1752–1806), New York State Senate
- Joseph H. Williams (1814–1896), Maine State Senate
- Joseph R. Williams (1808–1861), Michigan State Senate
- Joseph T. Williams (1842–1910), Nevada State Senate
- Josiah B. Williams (1810–1883), New York State Senate
- Kent M. Williams (born 1960), South Carolina State Senate
- Lindon Williams (1932–1989), Texas State Senate
- Lindsey Williams, Pennsylvania State Senate
- Marmaduke Williams (1774–1850), North Carolina State Senate
- Marty Williams (born 1951), Virginia State Senate
- Matt Williams (Nebraska politician) (born 1949), Nebraska State Senate
- Michael Williams (Georgia politician) (fl. 2010s), Georgia State Senate
- Micheal R. Williams (born 1955), Tennessee State Senate
- Morgan B. Williams (1831–1903), Pennsylvania State Senate
- Myron B. Williams (c. 1817–1884), Wisconsin State Senate
- Nelson Williams (politician) (fl. 1860s), Wisconsin State Senate
- Nikema Williams (born 1978), Georgia State Senate
- Penny Williams (born 1937), Oklahoma State Senate
- Phil Williams (Alabama senator) (born 1965), Alabama State Senate
- Ray Robinson Williams (1899–1987), South Carolina State Senate
- Richard H. Williams (New York politician) (1807–?), New York State Senate
- Richard S. Williams, New York State Senate
- Sandra Williams, Ohio State Senate
- Stephen K. Williams (1819–1916), New York State Senate
- Steve Williams (politician) (born 1951), Ohio State Senate
- Suzanne Williams (fl. 1970s–2010s), Colorado State Senate
- Thomas Williams (Pennsylvania politician) (1806–1872), Pennsylvania State Senate
- Tommie Williams (fl. 1990s–2010s), Georgia State Senate
- Tommy Williams (Texas politician) (born 1956), Texas State Senate
- William B. Williams (Michigan politician) (1826–1905), Michigan State Senate
