= Mackville =

Mackville may refer to several places in the United States:

- Mackville, Kentucky
- Mackville, Missouri
- Mackville, Wisconsin
