= Randy Pietzman =

American politician (born 1961)

Member of the Missouri House of Representatives from the 41st district
- In office 2015–2023
- Preceded by: Ed Schieffer
- Succeeded by: Doyle Justus

Personal details
- Born: June 1, 1961 (age 65) Troy, Missouri, U.S.
- Party: Republican
- Spouse: Faith
- Children: 4
- Profession: businessman

Randy Pietzman (born June 1, 1961) is an American politician. He is a former member of the Missouri House of Representatives, serving from 2015 to 2023. He is a member of the Republican Party.

== Electoral history ==
=== State representative ===
Missouri House of Representatives primary election, District 41, August 5, 2014
Party	Candidate	Votes	%	±%
Republican	Randy Pietzman	2,511	56.26%	
Republican	Alexandra Salsman	1,952	43.74%	

Missouri House of Representatives election, District 41, November 4, 2014
Party	Candidate	Votes	%	±%
Republican	Randy Pietzman	6,243	61.79%	+20.10
Democratic	Dan Dildine	3,861	38.21%	−20.10

Missouri House of Representatives election, District 41, November 8, 2016
Party	Candidate	Votes	%	±%
Republican	Randy Pietzman	15,609	100.00%	+38.21

Missouri House of Representatives election, District 41, November 6, 2018
Party	Candidate	Votes	%	±%
Republican	Randy Pietzman	10,612	68.64%	−31.36
Democratic	David A. Beckham	4,848	31.36%	+31.36

Missouri House of Representatives election, District 41, November 3, 2020
Party	Candidate	Votes	%	±%
Republican	Randy Pietzman	18,148	100.00%	+1.36
