= Briscoe, Missouri =

Unincorporated community in Missouri, U.S.

Coordinates: 39°04′55″N 91°00′44″W

Briscoe is a small unincorporated community in Lincoln County, Missouri, United States.

The community sits on the east bank of the North Fork of the Cuivre River at the end of Missouri Route K two miles west of US Route 61. The community of Davis is 1.5 miles south along the river and Silex is 3.5 miles to the northwest.

== History ==
Briscoe was platted in 1883. The community was named after Samuel Briscoe, the original owner of the town site. A post office called Briscoe was established in 1882, and remained in operation until 1959.
