= South Troy, Missouri =

- Unincorporated community
- Location within Missouri Location within the United States
- Coordinates: 38°57′26″N 90°59′40″W
- Country: United States
- State: Missouri
- County: Lincoln
- Elevation: 623 ft (190 m)
- Time zone: UTC-6 (Central (CST))
  - Summer (DST): UTC-5 (CDT)
- Area code: 660
- GNIS feature ID: 726792

South Troy is an unincorporated community in Lincoln County, Missouri, United States.

The community is located approximately one mile south-southwest of Troy on Missouri Route J.
