= Moscow Mills, Missouri =

City in Missouri, US

- City
- Historic First Savings Bank building

- Location in Missouri
- Coordinates: 38°56′24″N 90°55′31″W
- Country: United States
- State: Missouri
- County: Lincoln

Government
  - Mayor: Patrick Flannigan

Area
  - Total: 3.16 sq mi (8.18 km^{2})
  - Land: 3.15 sq mi (8.16 km^{2})
  - Water: 0.0077 sq mi (0.02 km^{2})
- Elevation: 538 ft (164 m)

Population (2020)
  - Total: 3,317
  - Density: 1,053.0/sq mi (406.55/km^{2})
- Time zone: UTC-6 (Central (CST))
  - Summer (DST): UTC-5 (CDT)
- ZIP code: 63362
- Area code: 636
- FIPS code: 29-50204
- GNIS feature ID: 2395417
- Website: moscowmillsmo.com

Moscow Mills is a city in Lincoln County, Missouri, United States. The population was 3,317 at the 2020 census.

== History ==
Moscow Mills was laid out in 1821, and named for a watermill of the same name near the original town site.

The Old Rock House was listed on the National Register of Historic Places in 1972.

== Geography ==
Moscow Mills is located on the west bank of the Cuivre River just east of U.S. Route 61 on Missouri Route C. Troy is approximately 3.25 miles to the northwest on Route 61.

According to the United States Census Bureau, the city has a total area of 3.14 square miles (8.13 km^{2}), of which 3.12 square miles (8.08 km^{2}) is land and 0.02 square miles (0.05 km^{2}) is water.

== Demographics ==
Historical population
Census	Pop.	Note	%±
1910	395		—
1920	348		−11.9%
1930	378		8.6%
1940	347		−8.2%
1950	350		0.9%
1960	360		2.9%
1970	399		10.8%
1980	484		21.3%
1990	924		90.9%
2000	1,742		88.5%
2010	2,509		44.0%
2020	3,317		32.2%
U.S. Decennial Census

=== 2020 census ===
As of the 2020 census, Moscow Mills had a population of 3,317. The median age was 31.2 years. 29.0% of residents were under the age of 18 and 10.1% of residents were 65 years of age or older. For every 100 females there were 101.9 males, and for every 100 females age 18 and over there were 97.0 males age 18 and over.

96.9% of residents lived in urban areas, while 3.1% lived in rural areas.

There were 1,252 households in Moscow Mills, of which 39.1% had children under the age of 18 living in them. Of all households, 41.8% were married-couple households, 19.9% were households with a male householder and no spouse or partner present, and 25.9% were households with a female householder and no spouse or partner present. About 25.0% of all households were made up of individuals and 7.6% had someone living alone who was 65 years of age or older.

There were 1,316 housing units, of which 4.9% were vacant. The homeowner vacancy rate was 0.5% and the rental vacancy rate was 5.8%.

Racial composition as of the 2020 census
Race	Number	Percent
White	2,832	85.4%
Black or African American	149	4.5%
American Indian and Alaska Native	16	0.5%
Asian	12	0.4%
Native Hawaiian and Other Pacific Islander	1	0.0%
Some other race	59	1.8%
Two or more races	248	7.5%
Hispanic or Latino (of any race)	143	4.3%

=== 2010 census ===
As of the census of 2010, there were 2,509 people, 873 households, and 641 families living in the city. The population density was 804.2 inhabitants per square mile (310.5/km^{2}). There were 979 housing units at an average density of 313.8 per square mile (121.2/km^{2}). The racial makeup of the city was 91.6% White, 3.7% African American, 0.1% Native American, 0.4% Asian, 0.9% from other races, and 3.1% from two or more races. Hispanic or Latino of any race were 2.0% of the population.

There were 873 households, of which 45.6% had children under the age of 18 living with them, 44.6% were married couples living together, 22.8% had a female householder with no husband present, 6.1% had a male householder with no wife present, and 26.6% were non-families. 20.5% of all households were made up of individuals, and 5.2% had someone living alone who was 65 years of age or older. The average household size was 2.82 and the average family size was 3.21.

The median age in the city was 30.7 years. 32.4% of residents were under the age of 18; 9.1% were between the ages of 18 and 24; 28% were from 25 to 44; 21.6% were from 45 to 64; and 8.9% were 65 years of age or older. The gender makeup of the city was 48.3% male and 51.7% female.

=== 2000 census ===
As of the census of 2000, there were 1,742 people, 609 households, and 453 families living in the city. The population density was 929.3 inhabitants per square mile (358.8/km^{2}). There were 692 housing units at an average density of 369.2 per square mile (142.5/km^{2}). The racial makeup of the city was 94.32% White, 3.16% African American, 0.34% Native American, 0.11% Asian, 0.29% from other races, and 1.78% from two or more races. Hispanic or Latino of any race were 0.92% of the population.

There were 609 households, out of which 45.8% had children under the age of 18 living with them, 47.5% were married couples living together, 19.0% had a female householder with no husband present, and 25.6% were non-families. 18.4% of all households were made up of individuals, and 3.4% had someone living alone who was 65 years of age or older. The average household size was 2.86 and the average family size was 3.21.

In the city the population was spread out, with 34.4% under the age of 18, 11.1% from 18 to 24, 35.1% from 25 to 44, 14.4% from 45 to 64, and 5.1% who were 65 years of age or older. The median age was 28 years. For every 100 females, there were 94.4 males. For every 100 females age 18 and over, there were 90.5 males.

The median income for a household in the city was $37,067, and the median income for a family was $42,083. Males had a median income of $30,264 versus $21,667 for females. The per capita income for the city was $14,555. About 5.3% of families and 8.7% of the population were below the poverty line, including 8.9% of those under age 18 and 8.7% of those age 65 or over.

== Education ==
The Lincoln County R-III School District serves Moscow Mills. The district's comprehensive high school is Troy Buchanan High School.
