= Fairview, Missouri (disambiguation) =

Fairview, Missouri may refer to:

- Fairview, Missouri, a small city in Newton County
- Fairview, Lincoln County, Missouri, an extinct hamlet
- Fairview, Nodaway County, Missouri, an extinct hamlet
- Fairview, Texas County, Missouri, an unincorporated community
- Fairview Acres, Missouri, a formerly incorporated village in St. Francois County that previously merged with Flat River which subsequently was merged with the city of Park Hills
- Fairview Township, Caldwell County, Missouri
- Fairview Township, Henry County, Missouri
- Fairview Township, Livingston County, Missouri
