= Lead Creek =

Stream in the American state of Missouri

Coordinates: 39.02775°N 91.04971°W

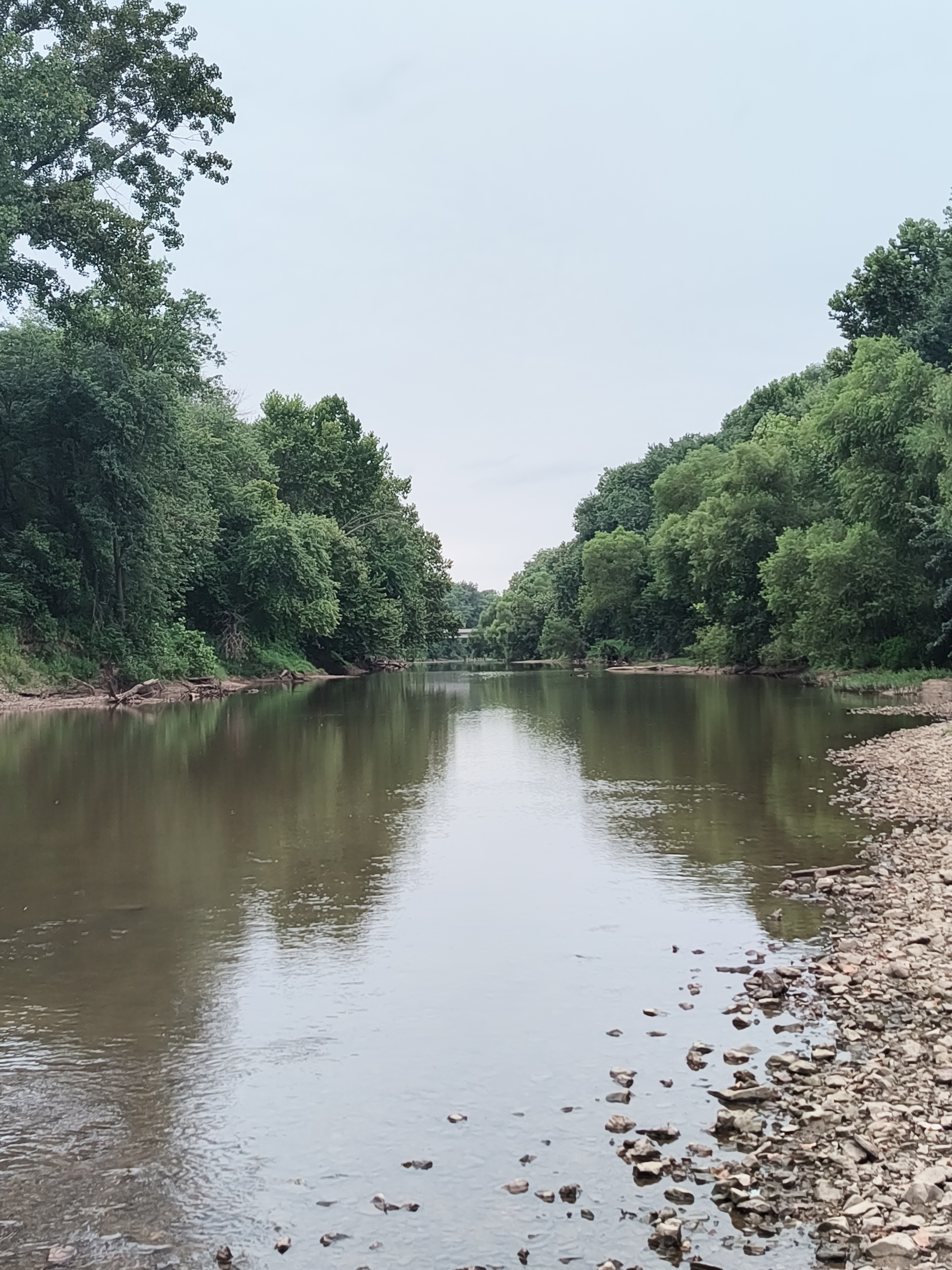
Lead Creek in 2026

Lead Creek is a stream in Lincoln County in the U.S. state of Missouri. It is a tributary of Cuivre River.

Indians were said to have conducted small-scale lead mining in the area, hence the name.

== See also ==
- List of rivers of Missouri
