= Warrenton High School =

Warrenton High School may refer to:

- Warrenton High School (Missouri)
- Warrenton High School (Oregon)
