= Olney, Missouri =

Unincorporated community in Missouri, U.S.

Coordinates: 39°05′02″N 91°14′36″W

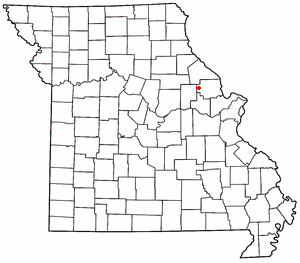

Olney is an unincorporated community in western Lincoln County, Missouri, United States. It is located on Missouri Supplemental Route O, approximately sixteen miles northwest of Troy.

== History ==
A town in the southwest part of Nineveh Township, about sixteen miles northwest of Troy. The town was founded and laid off in 1855 by Joseph S. Wells, who in that year built the first house, but never recorded the plat and gave no name to the place. For years the town was known as Nineveh; and it must have still borne that name in 1872, when Nineveh Township (q.v.) was organized and named for it. Nineveh is a Bible name, the scene of the effective preaching of the prophet Honah. When, however, a post office was first established there, it was named Lost Branch, for the nearby creek. In 1875, however, on the 17th of May, it was resurveyed and platted by Surveyor John C. Dpwney for John C. Wells and the other proprietors, and was then renamed Olney. The post office of Lost Branch was discontinud in 1877 and Olney established in its place. The reasons for selecting the name Olney are unknown. There are seven other Olneys in the United States, the largest and nearest being Olney, Illinois. All of them go back originally to Olney, England, a place especially dear in the hearts of Methodists as being the home of the poet Cowper and of the well-known Methodist collection known as the "Olney Hymns," written by Cowper and John Newton and published in 1779. As the earlier name Nineveh suggesrts, the people of Olney, Missouri, must have been religiously inclined and the name Olney would naturally appeal to them for that reason. (Postal Guide; COUNTY ATLAS1878, 5, 12-14; HIST. LINCOLN, 237, 422; Andy J. Brown) .
