= Richard H. Norton =

American lawyer and politician (1849–1918)

Richard Henry Norton
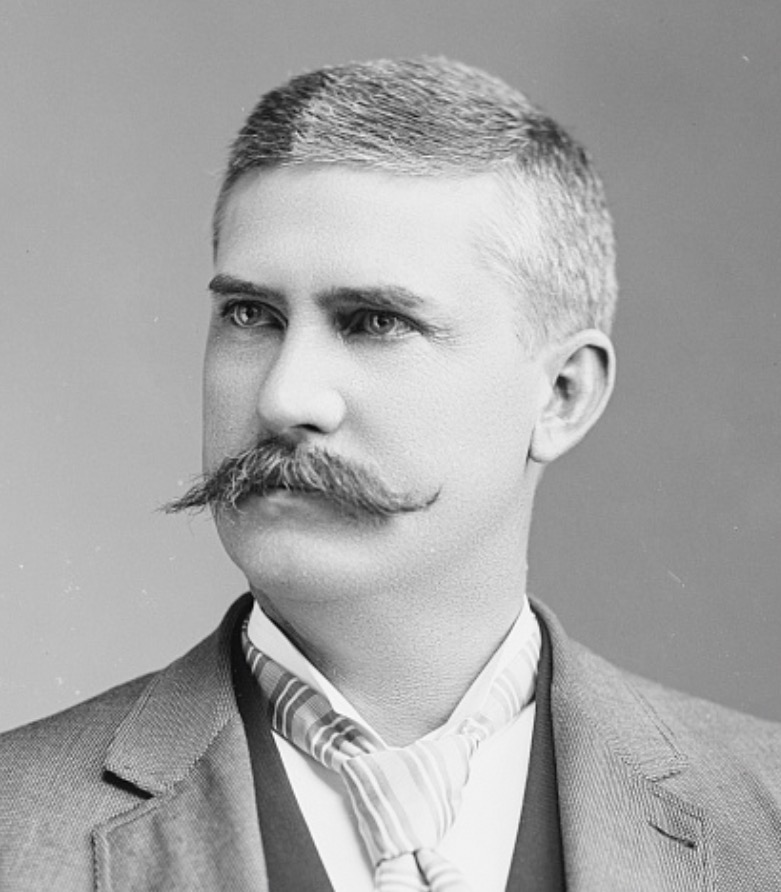
- Portrait of Norton by Charles Milton Bell, taken between 1873 and 1890

Member of the U.S. House of Representatives from Missouri's 7th district
- In office March 4, 1889 – March 3, 1893
- Preceded by: John E. Hutton
- Succeeded by: John T. Heard

Personal details
- Born: Richard Henry Norton; November 6, 1849 Troy, Missouri, US
- Died: March 15, 1918 (aged 68) St. Louis, Missouri, US
- Party: Democratic
- Education: Westminster College; Saint Louis University; Washington University in St. Louis
- Occupation: Lawyer, politician

Richard Henry Norton (November 6, 1849 – March 15, 1918) was an American lawyer and politician. A Democrat, he was a member of the United States House of Representatives from Missouri.

== Biography ==
Norton was born on November 6, 1849, in Troy, Missouri, the son of Elias Norton. He studied at Westminster College, Saint Louis University, and the law school of Washington University in St. Louis, graduating from the latter in 1870. In 1870, he was admitted to the bar, after which he began practicing in Troy.

Norton was a Democrat. He had previously ran in five Democratic primaries for Congress. In the Democratic primary for the 1880 United States House of Representatives election, he faced Judge Elijah Robinson, and they tied. Instead of by vote, Norton was decided the Democratic candidate by the flip of a penny; this event led Champ Clark to support primary elections.

Norton was a member of the House from March 4, 1889, to March 3, 1893, representing Missouri's 7th district. His tenure in the House was his first and only position in public service. He was a member of the Committee on Levees and Improvements of the Mississippi River. In 1900, Ainslee's Magazine described his tenure as overlooked and "neither a favorite nor an object of dislike". Ideologically, he was liberal.

After serving in Congress, Norton worked in law and agriculture. In 1874, he married Annie Ward; they had a child together. He died on March 15, 1918, aged 68, at Barnes-Jewish Hospital in St. Louis, and was buried at the Troy City Cemetery.

U.S. House of Representatives
| Preceded by John E. Hutton | Member of the U.S. House of Representatives from Missouri's 7th congressional district 1889-1893 | Succeeded by John T. Heard |
