= Lincoln County R-III School District =

School district in Missouri, U.S.

Address
- 951 West College Street Troy, Missouri, 63379; United States

District information
- Type: Public
- Grades: PreK–12
- NCES District ID: 2930450

Students and staff
- Students: 6,493
- Teachers: 433.16
- Staff: 242.2
- Student–teacher ratio: 14.99

Other information
- Website: www.troy.k12.mo.us

The Lincoln County R-III School District is a school district in Missouri. Its headquarters are in Troy.

Mostly in Lincoln County, its boundary within that county includes Cave, Fountain N' Lakes, Hawk Point, Moscow Mills, Troy, and Truxton. The boundary extends to a portion of Montgomery County and a portion of Warren County.

In 2023, Toyota Motor Manufacturing Missouri gave grants totaling to 230 thousand dollars to Lincoln County R-III and Silex R-1 School District to fund educational programs.

== Schools ==
- Troy Buchanan High School (Grades 10–12) (formerly grades 9–12)
- Troy Ninth Grade Center (Ninth Grade Only)
- Troy Middle School
- Troy South Middle School
- Main Street Elementary School
- Boone Elementary School
- Claude Brown Elementary School
- Cuivre Park Elementary
- William Cappel Elementary School
- Lincoln Elementary School
- Lincoln County R-III Early Childhood Education Center
- Hawk Point Elementary School
