= Marc Benavidez =

American football coach (born c.1989)

Current position
- Title: Head coach
- Team: William Penn
- Conference: HAAC
- Record: 19–14

Biographical details
- Born: c. 1989 (age 36–37); Troy, Missouri, U.S.
- Education: Avila University (2012)

Playing career
- 2009–2012: Avila
- Positions: Quarterback, wide receiver, defensive back

Coaching career (HC unless noted)
- 2013–2014: Avila (GA)
- 2015–2016: Avila (RB/WR/OL)
- 2017: Avila (AHC/OC)
- 2018–2022: Avila
- 2023–present: William Penn

Head coaching record
- Overall: 58–26
- Tournaments: 1–2 (NAIA playoffs)

Accomplishments and honors

Championships
- 2 KCAC (2020, 2022)

Awards
- KCAC Coach of the Year (2022) Heart North Coach of the Year (2025) SportsGuysIowa Coach of the Year (2025)

Marc Benavidez (born c. 1989) is an American college football coach. He currently ranks 12th in winningest active NAIA football coaches. He is the head football coach for William Penn University, a position he has held since 2023. He was the head football coach for Avila University from 2018 to 2022, after serving as an assistant since 2013. He played college football for Avila as a quarterback, wide receiver, and defensive back.

== Head coaching record ==
Year	Team	Overall	Conference	Standing	Bowl/playoffs	NAIA Coaches'^{#}
Avila Eagles (Kansas Collegiate Athletic Conference) (2018–2022)
2018	Avila	7–3	7–3	3rd		
2019	Avila	7–3	7–3	T–2nd		
2020–21	Avila	8–1	6–1	T–1st		19
2021	Avila	7–3	7–3	4th		
2022	Avila	10–2	9–1	T–1st	L NAIA First Round	13
Avila:		39–12	36–11			
William Penn Statesmen (Heart of America Athletic Conference) (2023–present)
2023	William Penn	4–6	2–3	T–4th (North)		
2024	William Penn	4–6	2–3	4th (North)		
2025	William Penn	11–2	5–1	2nd (North)	L NAIA Second Round	12
2026	William Penn	0–0	0–0	(North)		
William Penn:		19–14	9–7			
Total:		58–26				
National championship Conference title Conference division title or championship game berth
