= Louisville, Lincoln County, Missouri =

Unincorporated community in Missouri, U.S.

Coordinates: 39°11′59″N 91°10′29″W

Louisville is an unincorporated community in Lincoln County, in the U.S. state of Missouri.

== History ==
Louisville was platted in 1832, and most likely was named after Louisville, Kentucky. A post office called Louisville was established in 1834, and remained in operation until 1913.
