= John E. Hutton =

American politician (1828–1893)

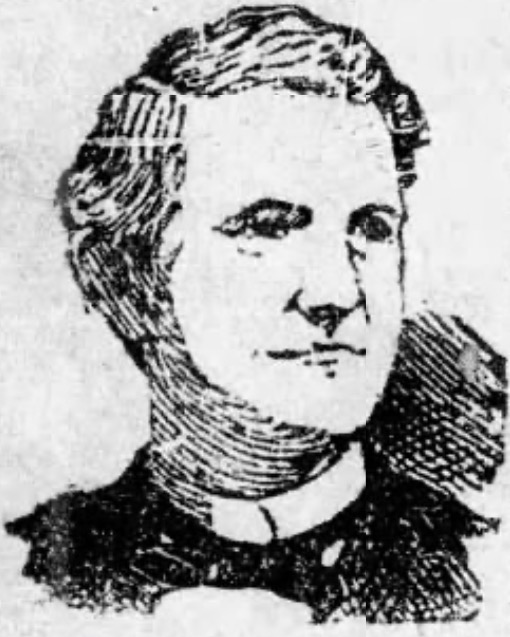
- Hutton in an 1894 newspaper

Member of the U.S. House of Representatives from Missouri's 7th district
- In office March 4, 1885 – March 3, 1889
- Preceded by: Aylett H. Buckner
- Succeeded by: Richard H. Norton

Personal details
- Born: John Edward Hutton; March 28, 1828 Polk County, Tennessee, US
- Died: December 28, 1893 (aged 65) Mexico, Missouri, US
- Party: Democratic
- Occupation: Politician, lawyer, physician, soldier, journalist

John Edward Hutton (March 28, 1828 – December 28, 1893) was an American politician, lawyer, physician, soldier, and journalist. A Democrat, he was a member of the United States House of Representatives from Missouri.

== Early life and education ==
Hutton was born on March 28, 1828, in Polk County, Tennessee, a son of Virginia-born William Hutton. In 1831, he and his family moved to Troy, Missouri, where he attended common schools. He studied medicine at Pope's Medical College and simultaneously worked as an educator.

== Career ==
After graduating, Hutton commenced practice in Warrenton. On September 2, 1862, he was commissioned as a colonel into the 59th Missouri Infantry Regiment, and fought in the American Civil War. After the war, he studied law, and in 1864, was admitted to the bar, after which he commenced practice in Warrenton.

In 1865, Hutton moved to Mexico, then practiced law there from then to until 1873; during that time, he partnered with George Bennett MacFarlane. During the Reconstruction era, he helped re-establish the Democratic Party in Missouri by writing letters; because of his letter writing, his friends encouraged him to become a journalist. In 1873, he and newspaperman John W. Jacks purchased The Intelligencer (then called The Ledger), turning it into a Democratic Party-aligned newspaper. He then purchased Jacks' stake in the newspaper and became its sole owner.

A Democrat, Hutton was an alternate delegate to the 1864 Democratic National Convention. He was a presidential elector in the 1864 and 1868 elections, voting for George B. McClellan and Horatio Seymour, respectively. He served in the United States House of Representatives from March 4, 1885, to March 3, 1889, representing Missouri's 3rd district. He did not run in the following election. Ideologically, he was liberal.

After serving in Congress, Hutton returned to practicing law and medicine.

== Personal life and death ==
On February 7, 1865, Hutton married Euphemia Gordon; they had four children together. He was a Presbyterian and a Freemason. He was a heavy smoker, which caused him heart problems. In 1893, he underwent surgery to remove a brain abscess, but it was ineffective. He died on December 28, 1893, aged 65, in Mexico, from the brain abscess, as well as from influenza. He was buried at Elmwood Cemetery, in Mexico.

U.S. House of Representatives
Preceded by Aylett H. Buckner	Member of the U.S. House of Representatives from Missouri's 7th congressional district 1885-1889	Succeeded by Richard H. Norton
