= Apex, Missouri =

Unincorporated community in Missouri, U.S.

Coordinates: 39°06′39″N 90°45′18″W

Apex is an unincorporated community in Lincoln County, in the U.S. state of Missouri.

== History ==
Apex had its start as a station on the Chicago, Burlington, and Quincy Railroad. A post office called Apex was established in 1880, and remained in operation until 1941.

In 1925, Apex had 28 inhabitants. Little remains of the original community.
