= Corso, Missouri =

Unincorporated community in Missouri, US

Coordinates: 39°07′38″N 91°11′10″W

Corso is an unincorporated community in western Lincoln County, Missouri, United States. It is located on Missouri Supplemental Route PP, approximately fourteen miles northwest of Troy.

A post office called Corso was established in 1873, and remained in operation until 1980. It is unclear why the name Corso was applied to this community.
