= Keelstone Branch =

Stream in the American state of Missouri

Coordinates: 38.9353273°N 90.8712443°W

Keelstone Branch is a stream in Lincoln County in the U.S. state of Missouri.

Keelstone Branch was named for deposits of red chalk ("keel" in local parlance) near its course.

== See also ==
- List of rivers of Missouri
