= New Hope, Missouri =

Unincorporated community in Missouri, U.S.

Coordinates: 39°08′12″N 90°51′51″W

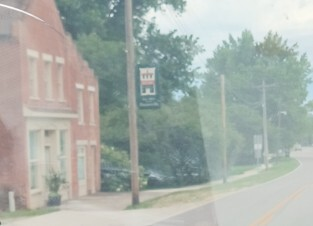
New Hope in 2026

New Hope is an unincorporated community in Lincoln County, in the U.S. state of Missouri.

== History ==
New Hope was platted in 1837. A post office called New Hope was established in 1837, and remained in operation until 1908.
