= Whitcomb Branch =

Stream in the American state of Missouri

Coordinates: 38.965326°N 90.929025°W

Whitcomb Branch is a stream in Lincoln County in the U.S. state of Missouri. It is a tributary of the Cuivre River.

Whitcomb Branch most likely has the name of Benjamin Whitecomb, a pioneer citizen.

== See also ==
- List of rivers of Missouri
