= Truxton, Missouri =

- Village
- Truxton Post Office

- Location of Truxton, Missouri
- Coordinates: 39°0′13″N 91°14′25″W
- Country: United States
- State: Missouri
- County: Lincoln

Area
  - Total: 0.27 sq mi (0.69 km^{2})
  - Land: 0.27 sq mi (0.69 km^{2})
  - Water: 0 sq mi (0.00 km^{2})
- Elevation: 712 ft (217 m)

Population (2020)
  - Total: 59
  - Density: 222.3/sq mi (85.82/km^{2})
- Time zone: UTC-6 (Central (CST))
  - Summer (DST): UTC-5 (CDT)
- ZIP code: 63381
- Area code: 636
- FIPS code: 29-74014
- GNIS feature ID: 2400007

Truxton is a village in Lincoln County, Missouri, United States. As of the 2020 census, Truxton had a population of 59.

== History ==
A post office called Truxton has been in operation since 1854. The community has the name of Thomas Truxtun, an officer in the Revolutionary War.

== Geography ==
According to the United States Census Bureau, the village has a total area of 0.25 square miles (0.65 km^{2}), all land.

== Demographics ==
Historical population
| Census | Pop. | Note | %± |
|---|---|---|---|
| 1990 | 90 | | — |
| 2000 | 96 | | 6.7% |
| 2010 | 91 | | −5.2% |
| 2020 | 59 | | −35.2% |
U.S. Decennial Census

=== 2010 census ===
As of the census of 2010, there were 91 people, 32 households, and 24 families living in the village. The population density was 364.0 inhabitants per square mile (140.5/km^{2}). There were 41 housing units at an average density of 164.0 per square mile (63.3/km^{2}). The racial makeup of the village was 100.0% White.

There were 32 households, of which 40.6% had children under the age of 18 living with them, 50.0% were married couples living together, 21.9% had a female householder with no husband present, 3.1% had a male householder with no wife present, and 25.0% were non-families. 21.9% of all households were made up of individuals, and 6.3% had someone living alone who was 65 years of age or older. The average household size was 2.84 and the average family size was 3.21.

The median age in the village was 34.3 years. 35.2% of residents were under the age of 18; 9.9% were between the ages of 18 and 24; 23.1% were from 25 to 44; 14.3% were from 45 to 64; and 17.6% were 65 years of age or older. The gender makeup of the village was 51.6% male and 48.4% female.

=== 2000 census ===
As of the census of 2000, there were 96 people, 35 households, and 28 families living in the village. The population density was 392.1 inhabitants per square mile (151.4/km^{2}). There were 41 housing units at an average density of 167.4 per square mile (64.6/km^{2}). The racial makeup of the village was 95.83% White, 3.12% Asian, and 1.04% from two or more races. Hispanic or Latino of any race were 1.04% of the population.

There were 35 households, out of which 31.4% had children under the age of 18 living with them, 54.3% were married couples living together, 14.3% had a female householder with no husband present, and 20.0% were non-families. 14.3% of all households were made up of individuals, and none had someone living alone who was 65 years of age or older. The average household size was 2.74 and the average family size was 2.79.

In the village, the population was spread out, with 20.8% under the age of 18, 6.3% from 18 to 24, 32.3% from 25 to 44, 26.0% from 45 to 64, and 14.6% who were 65 years of age or older. The median age was 38 years. For every 100 females, there were 100.0 males. For every 100 females age 18 and over, there were 105.4 males.

The median income for a household in the village was $40,625, and the median income for a family was $40,938. Males had a median income of $28,125 versus $33,750 for females. The per capita income for the village was $15,901. There were 4.5% of families and 7.0% of the population living below the poverty line, including no under eighteens and 9.1% of those over 64.

== Education ==
It is in the Troy R-III School District. The district's comprehensive high school is Troy Buchanan High School.
