= Brevator, Missouri =

Unincorporated community in Missouri, U.S.

Coordinates: 38°57′29″N 90°44′35″W

Brevator is an unincorporated community in Lincoln County, in the U.S. state of Missouri.

== History ==
Brevator was platted in 1880, and named after John Brevator, the original owner of the town site. A post office called Brevator was established in 1880, and remained in operation until 1932.
