= McLean Creek =

Stream in the American state of Missouri

Coordinates: 38.97255°N 90.71068°W

McLean Creek is a stream in Lincoln County in the U.S. state of Missouri.

McLean Creek has the name of Alexander McLean, a pioneer settler.

== See also ==
- List of rivers of Missouri
