= Dameron, Missouri =

Unincorporated community in Missouri, U.S.

Coordinates: 39°13′05″N 90°48′01″W

Dameron is an unincorporated community in Lincoln County, in the U.S. state of Missouri.

== History ==
A post office called Dameron was established in 1880, and remained in operation until 1909. An early postmaster gave the community his last name.
