= Okete, Missouri =

Township, in Missouri, United States

- Location within Missouri Location within the United States Location within the United States
- Coordinates: 39°05′52″N 90°55′49″W
- Country: United States
- State: Missouri
- County: Lincoln
- Elevation: 755 ft (230 m)
- Time zone: UTC-6 (CST)
  - Summer (DST): UTC-5 (CDT)
- ZIP Code: 63379
- GNIS feature ID: 723707

Okete is an unincorporated community in Lincoln County, in the U.S. state of Missouri.

== History ==
A post office called Okete was established in 1887, and remained in operation until 1907. The name was suggested by postal officials.
