= Hawk Point, Missouri =

- City
- Hawk Point in September 2026

- Location of Hawk Point, Missouri
- Coordinates: 38°58′17″N 91°07′53″W
- Country: United States
- State: Missouri
- County: Lincoln

Area
  - Total: 0.42 sq mi (1.08 km^{2})
  - Land: 0.42 sq mi (1.08 km^{2})
  - Water: 0 sq mi (0.00 km^{2})
- Elevation: 735 ft (224 m)

Population (2020)
  - Total: 676
  - Density: 1,628.7/sq mi (628.83/km^{2})
- Time zone: UTC-6 (Central (CST))
  - Summer (DST): UTC-5 (CDT)
- ZIP code: 63349
- Area code: 636
- FIPS code: 29-31024
- GNIS feature ID: 2394330
- Website: hawkpointmo.com

Hawk Point is a city in Lincoln County, Missouri, United States. As of the 2020 census, Hawk Point had a population of 676.

== History ==
A post office called Hawk Point has been in operation since 1840. The community was named for the fact that hawks nested near the original town site.

== Geography ==
According to the United States Census Bureau, the city has a total area of 0.37 square miles (0.96 km^{2}), all land.

== Demographics ==
Historical population
Census	Pop.	Note	%±
1910	299		—
1920	256		−14.4%
1930	311		21.5%
1940	279		−10.3%
1950	254		−9.0%
1960	270		6.3%
1970	354		31.1%
1980	386		9.0%
1990	472		22.3%
2000	459		−2.8%
2010	669		45.8%
2020	676		1.0%
U.S. Decennial Census

=== 2010 census ===
As of the census of 2010, there were 669 people, 247 households, and 169 families living in the city. The population density was 1,808.1 inhabitants per square mile (698.1/km^{2}). There were 288 housing units at an average density of 778.4 per square mile (300.5/km^{2}). The racial makeup of the city was 94.0% White, 1.3% African American, 0.1% Native American, 0.6% from other races, and 3.9% from two or more races. Hispanic or Latino of any race were 5.8% of the population.

There were 247 households, of which 42.5% had children under the age of 18 living with them, 46.2% were married couples living together, 14.2% had a female householder with no husband present, 8.1% had a male householder with no wife present, and 31.6% were non-families. 24.7% of all households were made up of individuals, and 6.9% had someone living alone who was 65 years of age or older. The average household size was 2.65 and the average family size was 3.12.

The median age in the city was 30.4 years. 28.4% of residents were under the age of 18; 10.2% were between the ages of 18 and 24; 30.2% were from 25 to 44; 23.3% were from 45 to 64; and 7.9% were 65 years of age or older. The gender makeup of the city was 49.6% male and 50.4% female.

=== 2000 census ===
As of the census of 2000, there were 459 people, 186 households, and 119 families living in the city. The population density was 1,820.8 inhabitants per square mile (703.0/km^{2}). There were 208 housing units at an average density of 825.1 per square mile (318.6/km^{2}). The racial makeup of the city was 97.82% White, 0.44% Asian, and 1.74% from two or more races.

There were 186 households, out of which 39.2% had children under the age of 18 living with them, 40.9% were married couples living together, 15.6% had a female householder with no husband present, and 35.5% were non-families. 32.8% of all households were made up of individuals, and 13.4% had someone living alone who was 65 years of age or older. The average household size was 2.47 and the average family size was 3.04.

In the city the population was spread out, with 31.8% under the age of 18, 9.6% from 18 to 24, 32.0% from 25 to 44, 14.8% from 45 to 64, and 11.8% who were 65 years of age or older. The median age was 31 years. For every 100 females, there were 102.2 males. For every 100 females age 18 and over, there were 100.6 males.

The median income for a household in the city was $29,286, and the median income for a family was $42,500. Males had a median income of $28,594 versus $20,313 for females. The per capita income for the city was $14,823. About 8.9% of families and 9.6% of the population were below the poverty line, including 11.1% of those under age 18 and 11.8% of those age 65 or over.

== Education ==
The Lincoln County R-III School District serves Hawk Point. The district's comprehensive high school is Troy Buchanan High School.

== Notable people ==
- George H. Middelkamp (1880–1966), politician
