= Doyle Justus =

American politician

Member of the Missouri House of Representatives from the 41st district
- Incumbent
- Assumed office January 4, 2023
- Preceded by: Randy Pietzman

Personal details
- Born: Troy, Missouri, U.S.
- Party: Republican
- Spouse: Virginia Mennemeyer
- Children: 2
- Education: University of Missouri

Doyle Justus is an American politician. He serves as a Republican member for the 41st district of the Missouri House of Representatives.

== Life and career ==
Justus is a former agriculture teacher.

In August 2022, Justus defeated Milton Schaper, Phil Newbold and Jeffrey Nowak in the Republican primary election for the 41st district of the Missouri House of Representatives. In November 2022, he defeated David Norman and Becky Martin in the general election, winning 72 percent of the votes.
