= Millwood, Missouri =

Unincorporated community in Missouri, U.S.

Coordinates: 39°06′10″N 91°06′23″W

Millwood is an unincorporated community in Lincoln County, in the U.S. state of Missouri.

== History ==
A post office called Millwood was established in 1842, and remained in operation until 1903. The community was named after William Millward, a congressman from Pennsylvania (a postal error accounts for the error in spelling, which was never corrected).
