= Ed Schieffer =

American politician (born 1949)

Member of the Missouri House of Representatives from the 11th district
- Incumbent
- Assumed office January 2007
- Preceded by: Wayne J. Henke

Personal details
- Born: November 28, 1949 (age 76) Troy, Missouri
- Party: Democratic
- Spouse: Maria Schieffer
- Education: Northeast Missouri State College; Southern Illinois University Edwardsville
- Profession: Teacher; Real Estate broker

Edward L. Schieffer (born November 28, 1949) is an American politician. He was a Democratic member of the Missouri House of Representatives. He represented the 11th District, encompassing all or parts of Lincoln county. Schieffer was first elected to the Missouri House in November, 2006, and reelected in 2008, 2010 and 2012.

== Personal history ==
Schieffer was born on November 28, 1949, in Troy, Missouri, the oldest son of Albert and Betty (Zalabak) Schieffer, and raised on the family farm nearby. Following his graduation from Troy Buchanan High School in 1967, Schieffer attended Northeast Missouri State College in Kirksville where he earned a bachelor's degree in education in 1971. He would later earn a master's degree in education from Southern Illinois University Edwardsville in 1977. Schieffer taught in Missouri schools for nearly three decades and is also a licensed insurance salesman, auctioneer, and real estate broker. He is a 4th degree Knights of Columbus member. Ed Schieffer and wife Maria live on their family farm near Troy, Missouri. They are the parents of two grown children.

== Political history ==
Ed Schieffer's first attempt at public office came in 2002 when he ran for the Missouri State Senate 2nd District seat, losing to Republican Jon Dolan by nearly 11,000 votes. Schieffer was more successful in his next attempt, winning the Missouri 11th District State Representative race in 2006, defeating Republican Milton Schaper and Libertarian candidate Gregory James Arrigo. He won re-election in 2008, 2010 and 2012. In 2014, he tried for the Senate again, this time in the 10th District.

Missouri 2nd District State Senate Election 2002
Party	Candidate	Votes	%	±%
Republican	Jon Dolan	35,523	59.0	Winner
Democratic	Ed Schieffer	24,694	41.0	

Missouri 11th District State Representative Election 2006
Party	Candidate	Votes	%	±%
Republican	Milton Schaper	6,851	44.4	
Democratic	Ed Schieffer	7,954	51.5	Winner
Libertarian	Gregory J. Arrigo	628	4.1	

Missouri 11th District State Representative Election 2008
Party	Candidate	Votes	%	±%
Republican	Dan Colbert	8,874	44.2	
Democratic	Ed Schieffer	11,653	55.7	Winner
Constitution	David A. Leefe	388	1.9	

Missouri 11th District State Representative Election 2010
Party	Candidate	Votes	%	±%
Republican	Michael (Mike) Clynch	6,527	44.1	
Democratic	Ed Schieffer	8,259	55.9	Winner

Missouri Senate election, November 4, 2014, District 10
Party	Candidate	Votes	%	±%
Republican	Jeanie Riddle	28,871	67.6%	Winner
Democratic	Ed Schieffer	13,856	32.4%	

=== Legislative assignments ===
Rep. Schieffer will serve on the following committees during the 96th General Assembly:

- Agri-Business
- Agriculture Policy
- Appropriations - Transportation and Economic Development subcommittee
- Transportation
