= Auburn, Missouri =

Unincorporated community in Missouri, U.S.

Coordinates: 39°07′36″N 90°58′26″W

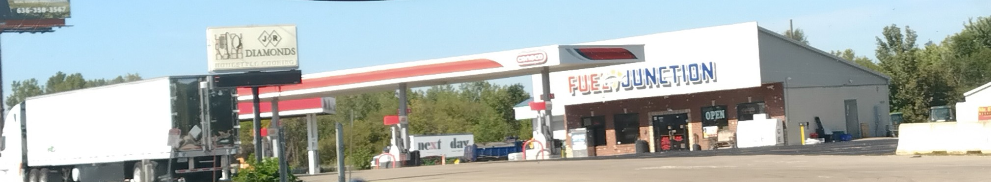
Auburn in 2024

Auburn is an unincorporated community in Lincoln County, Missouri, United States.

== History ==
Auburn was platted in 1838, and named after Auburn, New York, the native home of a share of the first settlers. A post office called Auburn was established in 1828, and remained in operation until 1905.
