= Chantilly, Missouri =

Unincorporated community in Missouri, U.S.

- Unincorporated community
- Interactive map of Chantilly, Missouri
- Coordinates: 38°59′53″N 90°50′35″W
- Country: United States
- State: Missouri
- County: Lincoln

Chantilly is an unincorporated community in Lincoln County, in the U.S. state of Missouri. The GNIS classifies it as a historically populated place.

== History ==
Chantilly was laid out in 1852, and named after Chantilly, in France. A post office called Chantilly was established in 1840, and remained in operation until 1918.
