= Famous, Missouri =

Unincorporated community in Missouri, U.S.

Famous
- Unincorporated community
- Interactive map of Famous
- Coordinates: 39°02′06″N 91°00′44″W
- Country: United States
- State: Missouri
- County: Lincoln
- Post office established: 1883
- Post office closed: 1908

Famous is an unincorporated community in Lincoln County, in the U.S. state of Missouri.

== History ==
A post office called Famous was established in 1883, and remained in operation until 1908. The name Famous was suggested by postal officials.
