= Birkhead Branch =

Stream in the American state of Missouri

Coordinates: 38.9872721°N 90.7840162°W

Birkhead Branch is a stream in Lincoln County in the U.S. state of Missouri.

Birkhead Branch has the name of William Birkhead, an early settler.

== See also ==
- List of rivers of Missouri
