= Brussells, Missouri =

Unincorporated community in Missouri, U.S.

Coordinates: 39°03′03″N 90°52′44″W

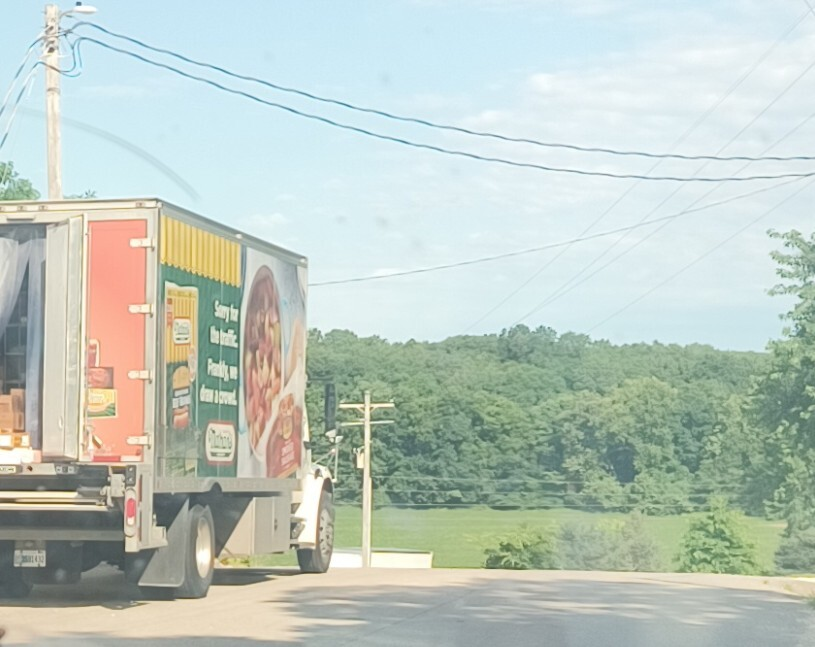
Brussells in 2026

Brussells (also spelled Brussels) is an unincorporated community in Lincoln County, in the U.S. state of Missouri.

== History ==
A post office called Brussells was established in 1876, and remained in operation until 1907. The name is a transfer from Brussels, the capital of Belgium.
