= Derwood Williams =

American politician (1889–1973)

Derwood E. Williams

Member of the Missouri Senate from the 11th district
- In office elected 1928 – ?

Personal details
- Born: August 14, 1889 Lincoln County, Missouri
- Died: April 1973 (aged 83)
- Party: Democratic
- Spouse: Jessie Shaw Childers
- Children: unknown
- Education: University of Missouri
- Occupation: politician, prosecuting attorney, lawyer

Derwood E. Williams (August 14, 1889 - April 1973) was an American politician from who served in the Missouri Senate and the Missouri House of Representatives. He served as prosecuting attorney of Lincoln County, Missouri, from 1919 until 1923. Williams was educated at Buchanan High School in Troy, Missouri, and the University of Missouri.
