= Davis, Missouri =

Unincorporated community in Missouri, U.S.

Coordinates: 39°03′29″N 91°01′11″W

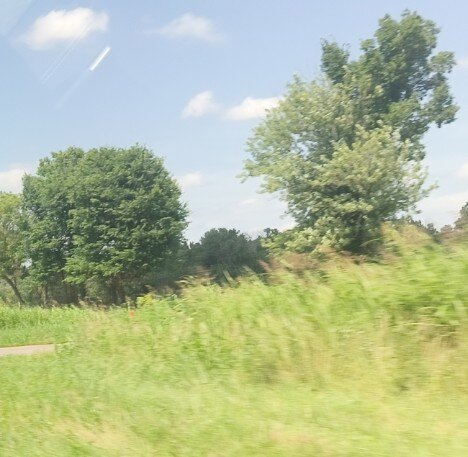
Davis in 2026

Davis is an unincorporated community in Lincoln County, in the U.S. state of Missouri.

== History ==
A post office called Davis was established in 1882, and remained in operation until 1959. The identity of the namesake of Davis has been lost to history.
