= Clinton Watson =

American politician (1888–1958)

Clinton T. Watson

Member of the Missouri Senate from the 32nd district
- In office elected April 1939 – 1942
- Preceded by: John M. McKeon

Personal details
- Born: July 3, 1888 Troy, Missouri
- Died: August 10, 1958 (aged 70) St. Louis, Missouri
- Party: Democratic
- Spouse: Josie Phelps
- Children: 2 daughters
- Occupation: politician, real estate, construction

Clinton T. Watson (July 3, 1888 – August 10, 1958) was an American politician from Troy, Missouri, who served in the Missouri Senate.

Born in Troy, Missouri, Watson attended the public schools until the age of 17, when he moved to St. Louis, Missouri, to work for the Butler Brothers retail chain there. He was elected to the state senate to succeed John M. McKeon, who had died in office. Watson unsuccessfully sought reelection in 1942, and later became an Alderman in St. Louis, remaining in that position until his death.

Watson married Josie Phelps, with whom he had two daughters.

Watson developed heart disease around the age of 65, and died of a heart attack in his home in St. Louis at the age of 70.
