= Mackville, Missouri =

Unincorporated community in Missouri, U.S.

Coordinates: 39°03′33″N 91°03′37″W

Mackville is an unincorporated community in Lincoln County, in the U.S. state of Missouri.

== History ==
A post office called Mackville was established in 1877, and remained in operation until 1902. The community derives its name from one "Mack" McElwel.
