= Warrenton High School (Missouri) =

American high school in Missouri

Location
- 803 Pinckney Street; Warrenton, Missouri; United States; 38°47′53″N 91°08′24″W

Information
- Type: Public high school
- Established: 1906; 120 years ago
- School district: Warren County R-III
- Principal: Bradley Ross
- Teaching staff: 58.94 (FTE)
- Grades: 9–12
- Enrollment: 978 (2023–24)
- Student to teacher ratio: 16.59
- Colors: Red and white
- Athletics conference: Gateway Athletic Conference
- Nickname: Warriors
- Accreditation: Missouri Department of Elementary and Secondary Education
- Yearbook: WAHISHO
- Website: Warrenton H.S.

Warrenton High School exterior

The Warrenton High School gym

Warrenton High School is a secondary school located in Warrenton, United States, in Warren County, Missouri. It is part of the Warren County R-3 School District.

== History ==
The current building was built in 1996. Prior to that period, the high school was housed in the current Black Hawk Middle School/Daniel Boone Building. Warrenton High School had 1006 students enrolled for the 2008–09 academic year, according to the Missouri Department of Elementary and Secondary Education.

It was not until 2005 that the school was officially called "Warrenton High School" by the district. Prior to that time there was a very-often-brought-up (and sometimes heated) debate as to whether the school's name was "Warrenton High School" or "Warren Co. R-3 High School." This confusion is still present, as MSHSAA calls all sports teams "Warren County." Following the tradition of students, however, district superintendent John Long decided to call the school "Warrenton High School" as of '05.

Warrenton High School is on a 4 day week. It is the second biggest school in Missouri to have adopted it.

== Athletics ==
Warrenton High School's colors are red and white. Its mascot is the Warrior. The school offers Softball, Cheerleading, Cross Country, Football, Soccer, Volleyball, Basketball, Wrestling, Dance Team, Baseball, Golf, and Track and Field.

Warrenton is the smallest school in the Gateway Athletic Conference which is made up of schools mostly from St. Charles County. Its largest rival, however, is county foe Wright City High School.

The Softball team won the school its first state championship in any sport in 2015, they would go on to win the state championship again in 2016.

== Student life ==
Warrenton has Marching and Concert bands as well as Color Guard, Choir, Speech and Debate, Math Team, Rotary Interact, Drama Productions which are a fall musical and spring play, and many other various clubs, including FFA, DECA, IMAGINE Higher Education (student-led college preparatory club), FCCLA, Photography Club, International Club, Peer Helpers, FBLA and FCA.
