= Cuivre River State Park =

State park in Missouri, United States

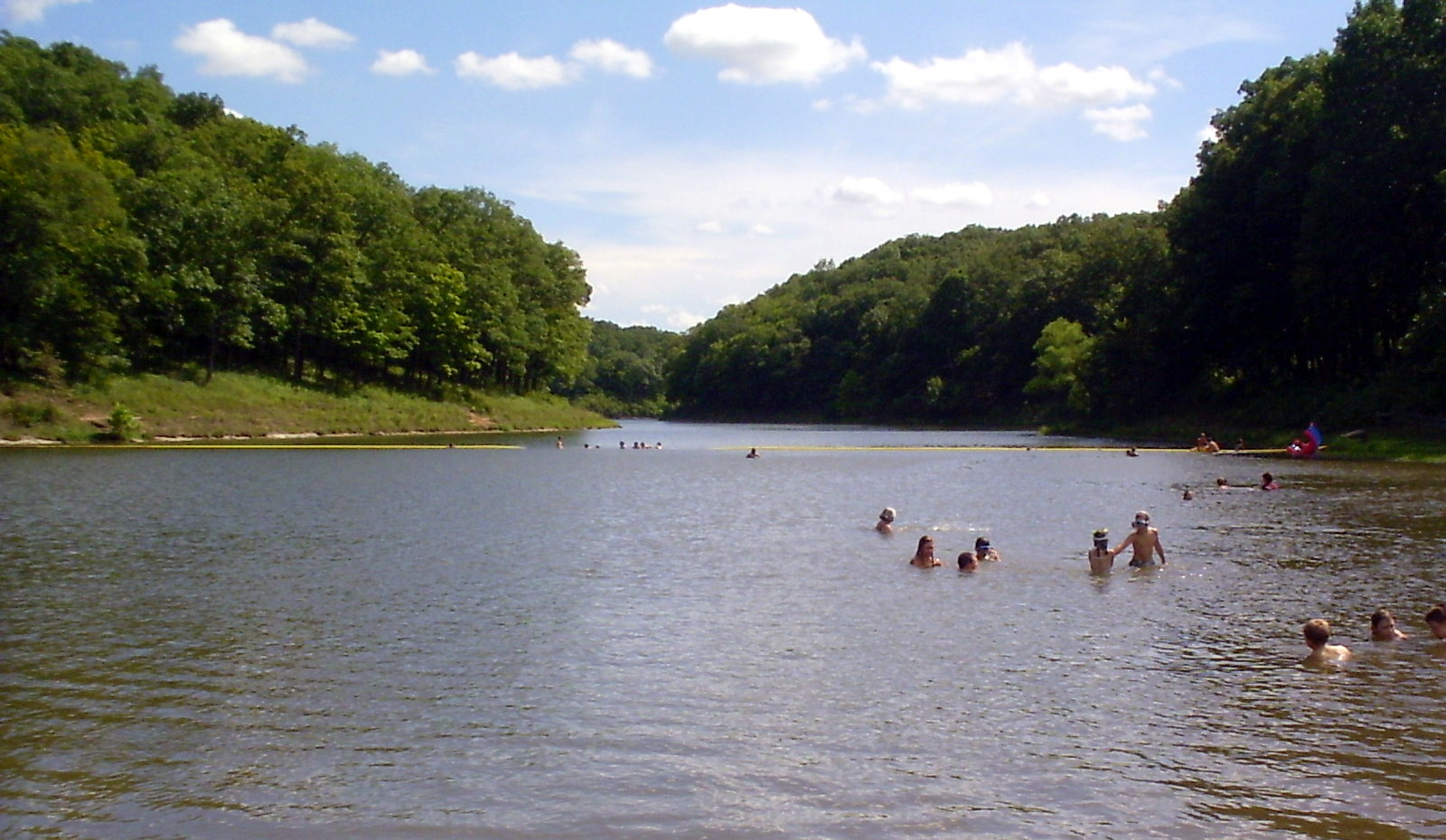
- Swimming area in Lincoln Lake

- Location within Missouri Location within the United States
- Location: Lincoln County, Missouri, United States
- Coordinates: 39°02′01″N 90°55′51″W
- Area: 6,426.94 acres (26.0089 km^{2})
- Elevation: 548 ft (167 m)
- Established: 1946
- Visitors: 738,330 (in 2022)
- Governing body: Missouri Department of Natural Resources
- Website: Cuivre River State Park
- Camp Sherwood Forest Historic District
- U.S. National Register of Historic Places
- U.S. Historic district
- Nearest city: Elsberry, Missouri
- Area: 132 acres (53 ha)
- Built: 1936
- Built by: CCC
- Architectural style: Rustic
- MPS: ECW Architecture in Missouri State Parks 1933-1942 TR
- NRHP reference No.: 85000512
- Added to NRHP: March 4, 1985
- Cuivre River State Park Administrative Area Historic District
- U.S. National Register of Historic Places
- U.S. Historic district
- Nearest city: Troy, Missouri
- Area: 620 acres (250 ha)
- Built: 1934
- Built by: CCC; WPA
- Architectural style: Rustic
- MPS: ECW Architecture in Missouri State Parks 1933-1942 TR
- NRHP reference No.: 85000514
- Added to NRHP: March 4, 1985

Cuivre River State Park is a public recreation area covering more than 6,400 acres (2,600 ha) northeast of the city of Troy in the Lincoln Hills region of northeastern Missouri, United States. The state park's rugged landscapes range from native grasslands and savannas to limestone bluffs overlooking forested hills. The park offers an extensive system of hiking trails plus swimming and camping facilities and is managed by the Missouri Department of Natural Resources. It encompasses the Lincoln Hills Natural Area (1872 acres) and two designated wild areas: Big Sugar Creek (1675 acres) and Northwoods (1082 acres).

== History ==
The park began as a federal recreation demonstration area in the 1930s when workers from the Civilian Conservation Corps and the Works Project Administration constructed roads, bridges, group camps, and a picnic shelter. The state took possession of the park in 1946. Two national historic districts—Camp Sherwood Forest and the Cuiver River State Park Administrative Area—were added to the National Register of Historic Places in 1985.

- Camp Sherwood Forest: The district encompasses 52 buildings and structures constructed by the Civilian Conservation Corps between 1934 and 1936. They include the Amphitheater (1936–1938), Council Circle (1936–1938), Dining Lodge (1936–1938), Central Restroom / Shower (1936–1938), Cook's Quarters (1936–1938), Administration Building (1936–1938), Recreation Hall (1936–1938), and Director's Lodge (1936–1938). The district also includes cabins and associated kitchen and latrine units at Ancaster Village, Nottingham Village, and Fountaindale Village.
- Cuiver River State Park Administrative Area: The district encompasses six buildings and structures constructed by the Civilian Conservation Corps and the Works Projects Administration between 1934 and 1941. They are the Cul Bridge (1941), Shelter/Restroom (1940), Wellhouse (1940), Warehouse (1934–1941), Service Building (Garage) (1934–1941), and Park Office (1934–1941).

== Activities and amenities ==
The park offers two campgrounds, backpack camping, fishing on Sugar Creek, swimming and canoeing on 55-acre Lake Lincoln, and trails for hiking, cycling and horseback riding.

Park trails
Trail	Length
Big Sugar Creek Trail	3.75 miles (6.04 km)
Blackhawk Point Trail	5.75 miles (9.25 km)
Blazing Star Trail	2 miles (3.2 km)
Cuivre River Trail	11.25 miles (18.11 km)
Frenchman's Bluff Trail	1.5 miles (2.4 km)
Hamilton Hollow Trail	.9 miles (1.4 km)
Lakeside Trail	3.5 miles (5.6 km)
Lone Spring Trail	5.2 miles (8.4 km)
Mossy Hill Trail	.8 miles (1.3 km)
Old Schoolhouse Trail	3.85 miles (6.20 km)
Prairie Trail	.3 miles (0.48 km)
Turkey Hollow Trail	.8 miles (1.3 km)
