= Fairview, Lincoln County, Missouri =

Unincorporated community in Missouri, U.S.

Coordinates: 39°02′08″N 91°11′01″W

Fairview is an unincorporated community in Lincoln County, in the U.S. state of Missouri.

== History ==
A post office called Fairview was established in 1882, and remained in operation until 1903. The name Fairview is commendatory.
