= John M. McKeon =

American politician (1882–1939)

Member of the Missouri Senate from the 32nd district
- In office 1938 – March 18, 1939
- Succeeded by: Clinton Watson

Personal details
- Born: October 29, 1882 St. Louis, Missouri, US
- Died: March 18, 1939 (aged 56) St. Louis, Missouri, US
- Party: Democratic
- Spouse: Anna Burns
- Children: 1
- Occupation: Politician

John M. McKeon (October 29, 1882 – March 18, 1939) was an American politician. A resident of St. Louis, he served in the Missouri Senate.
