= Ethlyn, Missouri =

Unincorporated community in Missouri, U.S.

Coordinates: 38°56′27″N 90°49′33″W

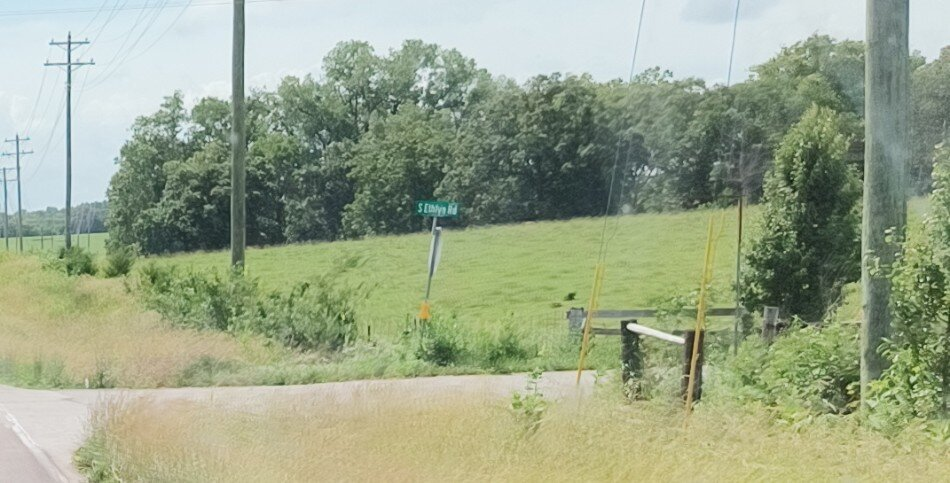
Ethlyn in 2026

Ethlyn is an unincorporated community in Lincoln County, in the U.S. state of Missouri.

== History ==
A post office called Ethlyn was established in 1904, and remained in operation until 1957. The community was named for one Ethlyn Brown.
