= Troy Buchanan High School =

Public high school in Missouri, US

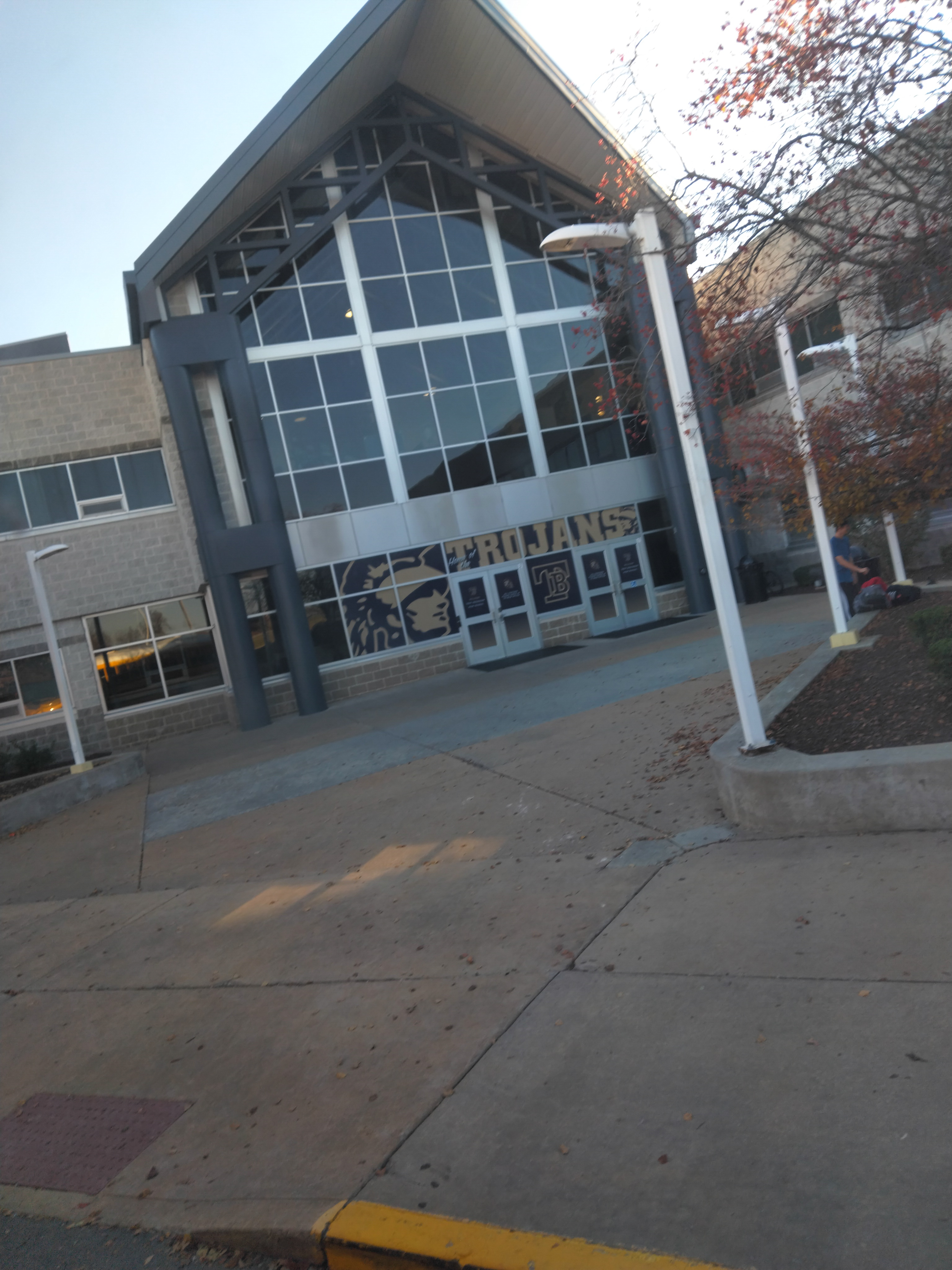
- Entrance to Troy Buchanan High School, 2023

Location
- 1190 Old Cap-au-Gris Road; Troy, Missouri 63379; United States; 38°58′34″N 90°57′36″W

Information
- Type: Public high school
- Established: 1914; 112 years ago
- School district: Lincoln County R-III School District
- Principal: Brian Brown
- Teaching staff: 146.08 (FTE)
- Grades: 10–12
- Enrollment: 2,148 (2024–25)
- Student to teacher ratio: 14.70
- Colors: Purple and gold
- Athletics conference: Gateway Athletic Conference
- Nickname: Trojans
- Website: tbhs.troy.k12.mo.us

Troy Buchanan High School (formerly Buchanan High School) is a 3-year public high school in Troy, Missouri, United States that is part of the Lincoln County R-III School District. The school is named after local merchant Alexander Buchanan, who donated a $1,500 endowment and the land for Buchanan College (which would sell property to the local school district upon closure) to be built.

== History ==
After Buchanan College sold their property in Troy to the local school district in 1905, Buchanan High School was founded in Fall 1914. A 1916 referendum proposed to build a gymnasium on to the existing school building. That location was used until 1956, when classes were moved to a new location.

In 1996, a new building was constructed at a cost of $13 million. Work on a ninth-grade center began in 2007, and was completed in Fall 2008.

In 2014, TBHS was featured in an NBC article which detailed their after-school active shooter trainings, which included student volunteers.

In February 2016, TBHS's field house caught on fire and was completely destroyed. The cause of the fire was undetermined, and it cost around $1 million in damages.

In Spring 2017, a new performing arts building, named the Hungate Performing Arts Center, was opened adjacent to the school. It is named after William and David Hungate.

== Boundary ==
Its boundary includes Cave, Fountain N' Lakes, Hawk Point, Moscow Mills, Troy, and Truxton.

== Academics ==
TBHS has course offerings for honors students. Advanced Placement classes are in place for science (biology and environmental science), mathematics (calculus and statistics), fine arts (music theory, art history, and 2D Studio Art), social science (psychology and world history), foreign language (Spanish and French). Since 2020, they have been a part of a Latin honors program.

Since April 2010, TBHS has been a designated high school for the A+ Scholarship Program.

TBHS has dual credit course offerings available through Lindenwood University, Missouri Southern State University, Missouri Baptist University, the St. Charles Community College, as well as Ranken Technical College.

== Athletics ==
TBHS athletic teams are named the Trojans; they are members of the Gateway Athletic Conference and compete in the South Division. A new athletic compound was opened in fall 2000. The softball team won state championships in 2011 and 2016.

== Student life ==
The school has a strong National FFA Organization program. It was named the Model of Innovations for Student Development in 2015. And was the Premiere Chapter for Building Communities in 2019. In 2020, the Chapter was a National Finalist for the Model of Excellence Award. The Troy FFA has also found success in CDE/LDEs (Career/Leadership Development Events). The Troy FFA won 3rd Place in the Nation at the 2022 National FFA Parliamentary Procedure Competition held in conjunction with the 95th Annual National FFA Convention and Expo.

TBHS has two competitive show choirs, "Express" and "Soundwave". The program hosts an annual competition. Express has won national-level competitions before, and Soundwave swept the jayvee division in their 2019 season.

Additionally, TBHS has a strong band program called Trojan Pride. There are several different bands that make up Trojan Pride, including: symphonic band, jazz band, concert band, marching band and pep band. In Fall 2023, throughout four competitions, Trojan Pride's marching band won 16 awards, including eight first place awards.

== Notable alumni ==
- Emily Crane, softball player on the Missouri Tigers softball team
- David Hungate, musician known for performing with the American rock band Toto
- DeAnna Price, track and field athlete specializing in hammer throw
- Ed Schieffer, legislator for the Missouri House of Representatives
