= Troy, Missouri =

City in Missouri, U.S.

- City
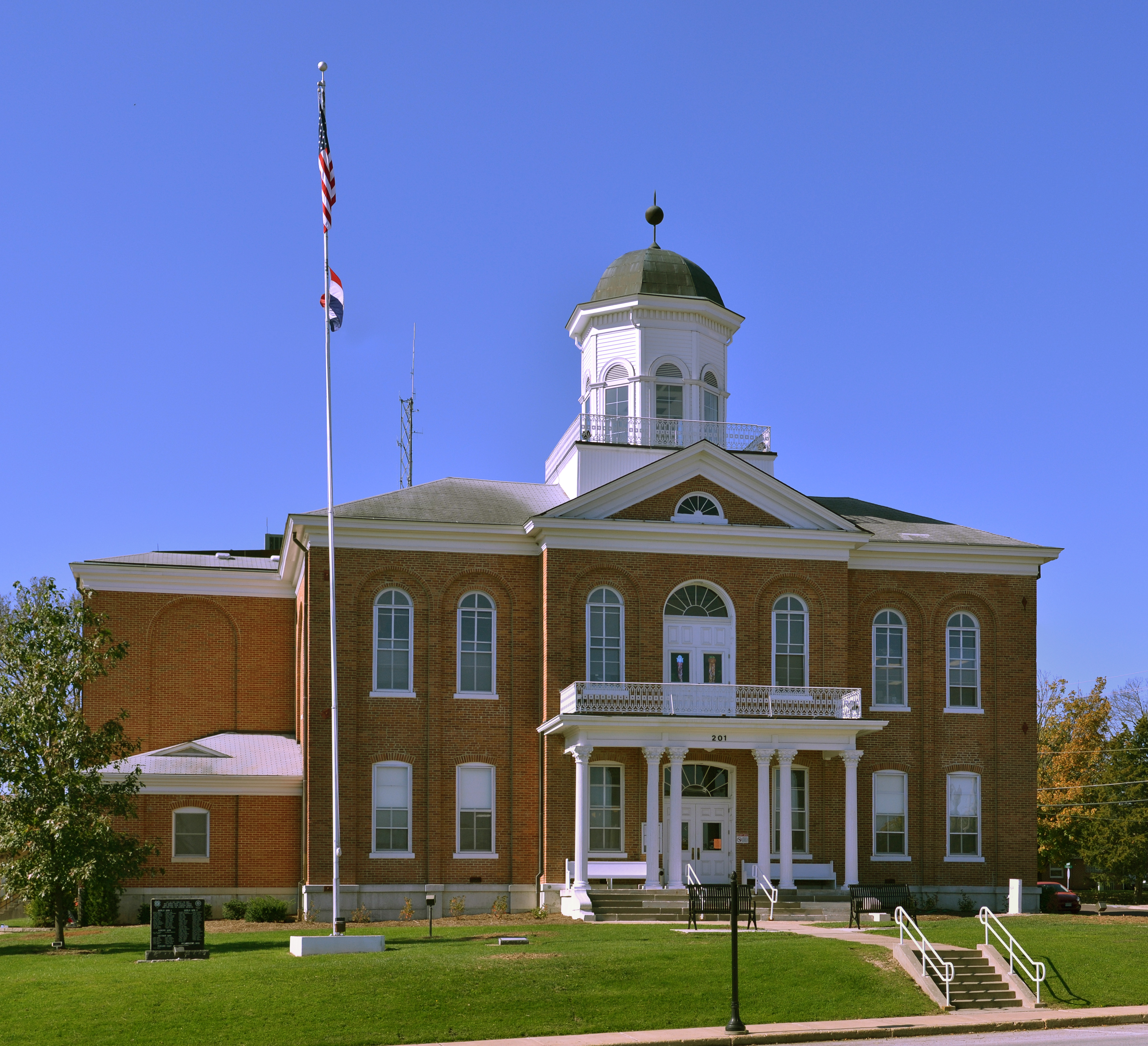
- Downtown Troy Historic District Post Office Lincoln County Courthouse

- Coordinates: 38°58′15″N 90°58′17″W
- Country: United States
- State: Missouri
- County: Lincoln
- Incorporated: 1819

Government
  - Mayor: Ron Sconce

Area
  - Total: 7.76 sq mi (20.10 km^{2})
  - Land: 7.72 sq mi (19.99 km^{2})
  - Water: 0.042 sq mi (0.11 km^{2})
- Elevation: 515 ft (157 m)

Population (2020)
  - Total: 12,686
  - Density: 1,643.4/sq mi (634.53/km^{2})
- Time zone: UTC-6 (CST)
  - Summer (DST): UTC-5 (CDT)
- ZIP code: 63379
- Area code: 636
- FIPS code: 29-73942
- GNIS feature ID: 2397062
- Website: cityoftroymissouri.com

Troy is a city in and the county seat of Lincoln County, Missouri, United States. As of the 2020 census, Troy had a population of 12,686. Troy is an exurb of St. Louis and part of the St. Louis Metropolitan Statistical Area.

== History ==
Troy was platted in 1819. Local historian Mrs. Guinn claimed the community was named after Troy, New York, while late-19th-century scholar Andy Brown believed the name came from Troy, Vermont. An early variant name was Woods Fort. A post office called Troy has been in operation since 1823.

=== Historic sites ===
Fort Cap au Gris, a War of 1812 fortification, was built near Troy in 1814. Mercy Hospital Lincoln was established in Troy in 1953 under the Hill-Burton Memorial Hospitals Act, as Lincoln County Memorial Hospital. Cuivre River State Park, one of the largest of Missouri's state parks, is about three miles northeast of Troy, across the Cuivre River valley.

==== Downtown Troy Historic District ====
- Downtown Troy Historic District
- U.S. National Register of Historic Places
- U.S. Historic district
- Location: Bounded by Annie Ave., 2nd, Marble & Court Sts., Troy, Missouri
- Area: 9.3 acres (3.8 ha)
- Architects: Bailey, David; Bachmann, Gustave; Pauly, P.J. & Bro.; Allison, Oscar; Downing & Luckett
- Architectural style: Late Victorian, Late 19th and 20th Century Revivals, Modern Movement
- NRHP reference No.: 13000857
- Added to NRHP: October 30, 2013

The Downtown Troy Historic District is a national historic district in Troy. The district encompasses 39 contributing buildings, one contributing site, and two contributing structures in the central business district and surrounding residential area. It developed between about 1832 and 1966, and includes representative examples of Late Victorian style architecture. Notable buildings include the Sherman Cottle House (1832), St. Stephens Methodist Church (1900–1901), Lincoln County Jail/Jailer's House (1876), Sacred Heart Catholic Church (1954), Lincoln County Courthouse (1869–1870), Troy Post Office (c. 1925), Farmers & Merchants Bank / Masonic Lodge (1906), Universalist Church / Masonic Hall (1837/1851), Lincoln County Motor Co. (1929), and United Baptist Church (1937). It was listed on the National Register of Historic Places on October 30, 2013.

== Geography ==
Troy is two miles west of the Cuivre River. U.S. 61 passes east of the city and Missouri Route 47 passes through the north side.

According to the United States Census Bureau, the city has an area of 7.34 square miles (19.01 km^{2}), of which 7.30 square miles (18.91 km^{2}) is land and 0.04 square miles (0.10 km^{2}) is water.

The Cuivre River flows near the city, and various creeks, such as Whitcomb Branch, flow through Troy.

== Demographics ==
Historical population
Census	Pop.	Note	%±
1860	611		—
1870	703		15.1%
1880	703		0.0%
1890	971		38.1%
1900	1,153		18.7%
1910	1,120		−2.9%
1920	1,116		−0.4%
1930	1,419		27.2%
1940	1,493		5.2%
1950	1,738		16.4%
1960	1,779		2.4%
1970	2,538		42.7%
1980	2,624		3.4%
1990	3,811		45.2%
2000	6,737		76.8%
2010	10,540		56.4%
2020	12,686		20.4%
U.S. Decennial Census

=== 2020 census ===
As of the 2020 census, Troy had a population of 12,686. The median age was 34.6 years. 27.1% of residents were under the age of 18 and 13.7% of residents were 65 years of age or older. For every 100 females there were 95.2 males, and for every 100 females age 18 and over there were 93.0 males age 18 and over.

97.8% of residents lived in urban areas, while 2.2% lived in rural areas.

There were 4,633 households in Troy, of which 38.3% had children under the age of 18 living in them. Of all households, 47.7% were married-couple households, 16.3% were households with a male householder and no spouse or partner present, and 26.9% were households with a female householder and no spouse or partner present. About 26.1% of all households were made up of individuals and 10.9% had someone living alone who was 65 years of age or older.

There were 4,821 housing units, of which 3.9% were vacant. The homeowner vacancy rate was 0.6% and the rental vacancy rate was 4.6%.

Racial composition as of the 2020 census
Race	Number	Percent
White	11,051	87.1%
Black or African American	376	3.0%
American Indian and Alaska Native	58	0.5%
Asian	75	0.6%
Native Hawaiian and Other Pacific Islander	2	0.0%
Some other race	239	1.9%
Two or more races	885	7.0%
Hispanic or Latino (of any race)	535	4.2%

=== Income and poverty ===
The 2016–2020 5-year American Community Survey estimates show that the median household income was $68,524 (with a margin of error of +/- $10,125) and the median family income was $73,326 (+/- $6,130). Males had a median income of $46,655 (+/- $7,043) versus $30,636 (+/- $2,944) for females. The median income for those above 16 years old was $34,958 (+/- $4,139). Approximately, 5.8% of families and 9.0% of the population were below the poverty line, including 8.4% of those under the age of 18 and 6.4% of those ages 65 or over.

=== 2010 census ===
As of the census of 2010, there were 10,542 people, 3,843 households, and 2,727 families living in the city. The population density was 1,443.8 inhabitants per square mile (557.5/km^{2}). There were 4,141 housing units at an average density of 567.3 per square mile (219.0/km^{2}). The racial makeup of the city was 92.5% White, 3.1% African American, 0.4% Native American, 0.7% Asian, 0.8% from other races, and 2.4% from two or more races. Hispanic or Latino of any race were 3.0% of the population.

There were 3,843 households, of which 43.6% had children under the age of 18 living with them, 50.5% were married couples living together, 14.8% had a female householder with no husband present, 5.6% had a male householder with no wife present, and 29.0% were non-families. 24.4% of all households were made up of individuals, and 10.1% had someone living alone who was 65 years of age or older. The average household size was 2.67 and the average family size was 3.16.

The median age in the city was 32.2 years. 30.5% of residents were under the age of 18; 7.7% were between the ages of 18 and 24; 30.4% were from 25 to 44; 19.6% were from 45 to 64; and 11.8% were 65 years of age or older. The gender makeup of the city was 47.4% male and 52.6% female.

=== 2000 census ===
As of the census of 2000, there were 6,737 people, 2,521 households, and 1,747 families living in the city. The population density was 1,134.5 inhabitants per square mile (438.0/km^{2}). There were 2,661 housing units at an average density of 448.1 per square mile (173.0/km^{2}). The racial makeup of the city was 93.87% White, 2.86% African American, 0.39% Native American, 0.13% Asian, 0.01% Pacific Islander, 0.80% from other races, and 1.93% from two or more races. Hispanic or Latino of any race were 1.71% of the population.

There were 2,521 households, out of which 39.8% had children under the age of 18 living with them, 51.6% were married couples living together, 14.6% had a female householder with no husband present, and 30.7% were non-families. 26.6% of all households were made up of individuals, and 12.5% had someone living alone who was 65 years of age or older. The average household size was 2.56 and the average family size was 3.10.

In the city, the population was spread out, with 29.8% under the age of 18, 9.2% from 18 to 24, 30.6% from 25 to 44, 16.4% from 45 to 64, and 14.0% who were 65 years of age or older. The median age was 32 years. For every 100 females, there were 87.1 males. For every 100 females age 18 and over, there were 83.7 males.

The median income for a household in the city was $40,332, and the median income for a family was $46,818. Males had a median income of $34,750 versus $24,440 for females. The per capita income for the city was $17,666. About 7.6% of families and 11.0% of the population were below the poverty line, including 13.4% of those under age 18 and 14.6% of those age 65 or over.

== Education ==
Troy is in the Lincoln County R-III School District. The district operates Troy Buchanan High School, Troy Middle School, Troy South Middle School, Main Street Elementary, Boone Elementary School, Claude Brown Elementary, Cuivre Park Elementary, Lincoln County R-III Early Childhood Education Center, William Cappel Elementary School, and Lincoln Elementary School.

Troy has no public library. Its library, the Powell Memorial Library, is owned and operated by the Troy R-III School District.

== Notable people ==
- Marc Benavidez (born c. 1990), college football coach
- Frederick Gilmer Bonfils (1860–1933), publisher
- James H. Britton (1817–1900), politician
- Emily Crane (born 1994), softball player
- Pendleton Dudley (1876–1966), journalist
- Pat Elzie (born 1960) basketball coach
- David Hungate (born 1948), musician, bass player
- William L. Hungate (1922–2007), politician and judge
- John E. Hutton (1828–1893), politician
- Maggie Illig (born 2004), soccer player
- Richard Alonzo Jaccard (1918–1942), Navy officer
- Doyle Justus, politician
- William J. Knox (1820–1867), businessman and politician
- Wilson McCoy (1902–1961), illustrator and painter
- Richard H. Norton (1849–1918), politician
- Randy Pietzman (born 1961), politician
- DeAnna Price (born 1993), hammer thrower
- Harley Race (1943–2019), wrestler
- Ed Schieffer (born 1949), politician
- Nathaniel Simonds (1775–1850), politician
- May Bonfils Stanton (1883–1962) heiress and philanthropist
- Dennis Tankersley (born 1979), baseball player
- Clinton Watson (1888–1958), politician
- Derwood Williams (1889–1973), politician

== See also ==
- List of cities in Missouri
