= Lincoln County, Missouri =

County in Missouri, United States

- County
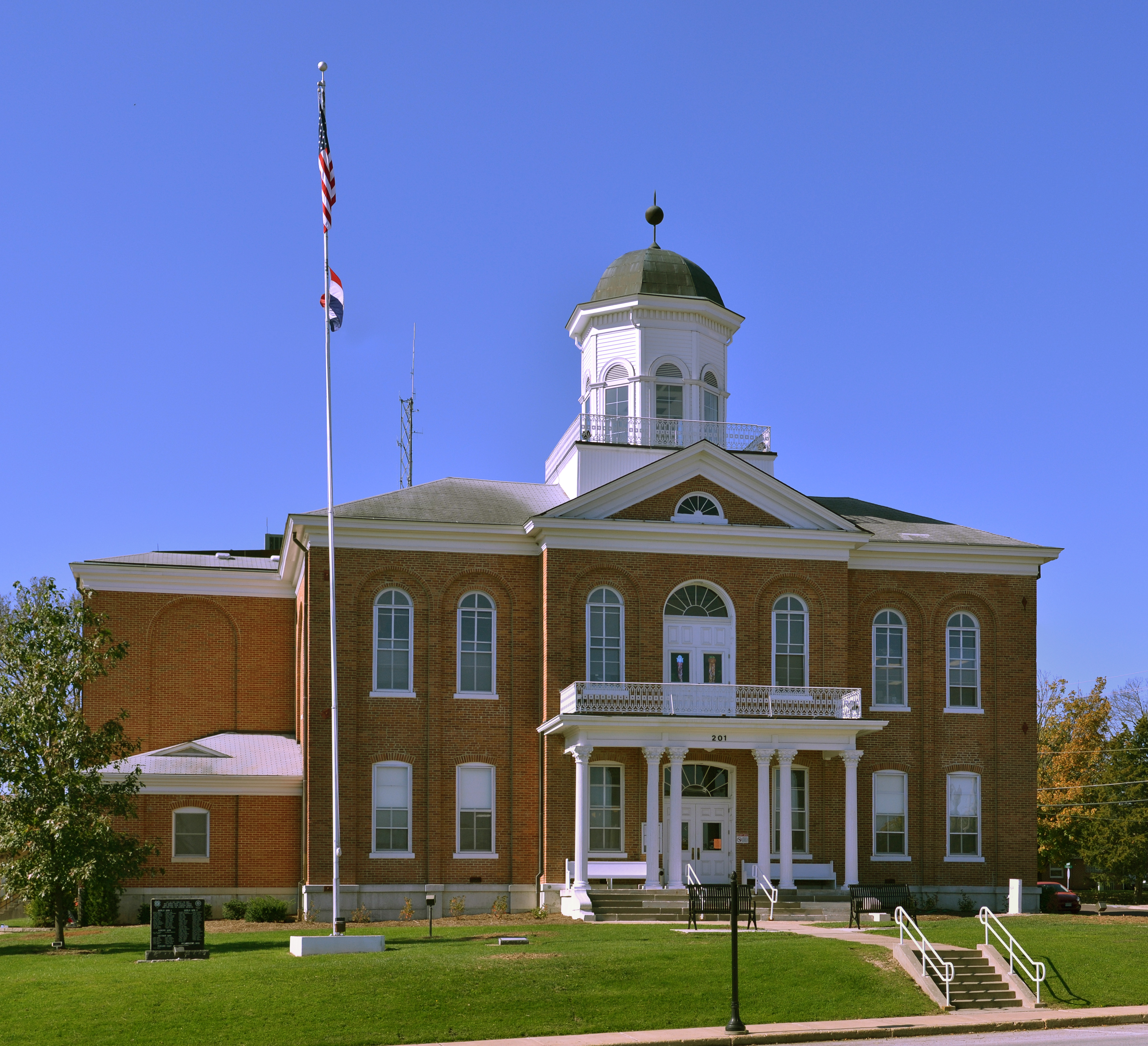
- Lincoln County Courthouse in Troy

- Location within the U.S. state of Missouri
- Coordinates: 39°04′N 90°58′W
- Country: United States
- State: Missouri
- Founded: December 14, 1818
- Named for: Benjamin Lincoln
- Seat: Troy
- Largest city: Troy

Area
  - Total: 640 sq mi (1,700 km^{2})
  - Land: 627 sq mi (1,620 km^{2})
  - Water: 14 sq mi (36 km^{2}) 2.2%

Population (2020)
  - Total: 59,574
  - Estimate (2025): 66,676 ▲
  - Density: 93/sq mi (36/km^{2})
- Time zone: UTC−6 (Central)
  - Summer (DST): UTC−5 (CDT)
- Congressional district: 6th
- Website: www.lincolncomo.gov

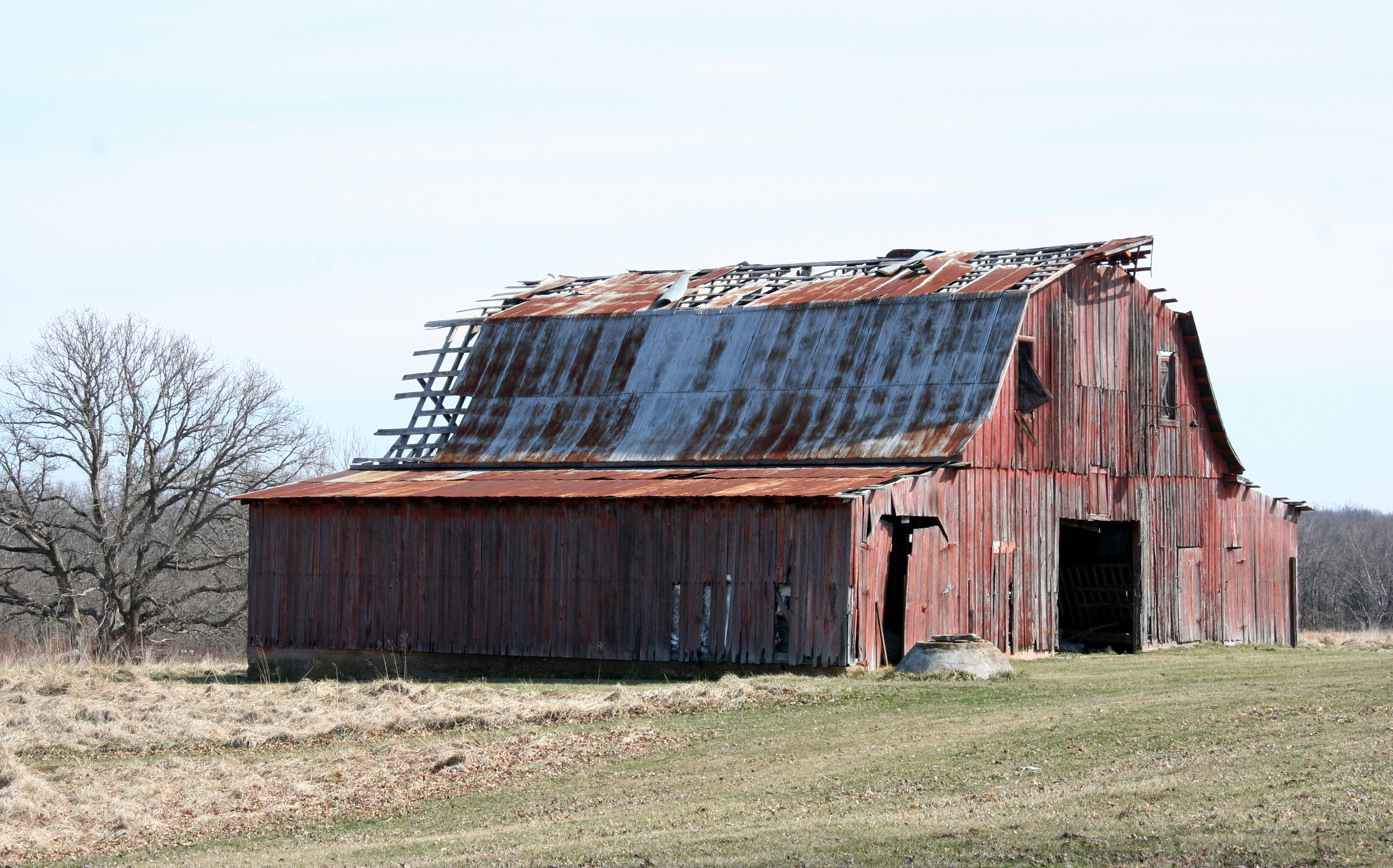
An old barn in rural Lincoln County

Lincoln County is located in the eastern part of the U.S. state of Missouri. As of the 2020 census, the population was 59,574. Its county seat is Troy. The county was founded December 14, 1818, and named for Major General Benjamin Lincoln of the American Revolutionary War. Lincoln County is part of the St. Louis, MO-IL Metropolitan Statistical Area.

== History ==
According to Goodspeed's History of Lincoln County, Missouri (1888), Lincoln County was named by Major Christopher Clark, the first permanent white settler in an address to the Territorial Legislature. He said, "I was born, sir, in Link-Horn County, N.C., I lived for many years in Link-Horn County in old Kain-tuck. I wish to die in Link-Horn County, in Missouri; and I move, therefore, that the blank in the bill be filled with the name Link-Horn." The motion was carried unanimously and the clerk, not adopting the frontier parlance of the Major, wrote "Lincoln" in the blank space of the bill. Others say it was named for Major General Benjamin Lincoln, who served in the Continental Army during the American Revolution.

== Geography ==
According to the U.S. Census Bureau, the county has a total area of 640 square miles (1,700 km^{2}), of which 627 square miles (1,620 km^{2}) is land and 14 square miles (36 km^{2}) (2.2%) is water. The county's eastern border with Illinois is formed by the Mississippi River.

=== Adjacent counties ===
- Pike County (north)
- Calhoun County, Illinois (east)
- St. Charles County (southeast)
- Warren County (southwest)
- Montgomery County (west)

=== Major highways ===
- U.S. Route 61
- Route 47
- Route 79
- Route 147

=== Transit ===
- Burlington Trailways
- OATS Transit

=== Railroads ===
- BNSF Railway

== Demographics ==
Historical population
Census	Pop.	Note	%±
1820	1,662		—
1830	4,059		144.2%
1840	7,449		83.5%
1850	9,421		26.5%
1860	14,210		50.8%
1870	15,960		12.3%
1880	17,426		9.2%
1890	18,346		5.3%
1900	18,352		0.0%
1910	17,003		−7.4%
1920	15,956		−6.2%
1930	13,929		−12.7%
1940	14,395		3.3%
1950	13,478		−6.4%
1960	14,783		9.7%
1970	18,041		22.0%
1980	22,193		23.0%
1990	28,892		30.2%
2000	38,944		34.8%
2010	52,566		35.0%
2020	59,574		13.3%
2025 (est.)	66,676	▲	11.9%
U.S. Decennial Census; 1790-1960 1900-1990; 1990-2000 2010-2020 2020

=== 2020 census ===
As of the 2020 census, the county had a population of 59,574. The median age was 37.4 years. 25.5% of residents were under the age of 18 and 14.2% of residents were 65 years of age or older. For every 100 females there were 100.4 males, and for every 100 females age 18 and over there were 98.8 males age 18 and over.

The racial makeup of the county was 89.8% White, 1.8% Black or African American, 0.4% American Indian and Alaska Native, 0.4% Asian, 0.1% Native Hawaiian and Pacific Islander, 1.0% from some other race, and 6.5% from two or more races. Hispanic or Latino residents of any race comprised 2.6% of the population.

28.0% of residents lived in urban areas, while 72.0% lived in rural areas.

There were 21,812 households in the county, of which 35.7% had children under the age of 18 living with them and 19.6% had a female householder with no spouse or partner present. About 21.3% of all households were made up of individuals and 8.4% had someone living alone who was 65 years of age or older.

There were 23,366 housing units, of which 6.7% were vacant. Among occupied housing units, 77.9% were owner-occupied and 22.1% were renter-occupied. The homeowner vacancy rate was 0.9% and the rental vacancy rate was 5.5%.

Lincoln County, Missouri – Racial and ethnic composition Note: the US Census treats Hispanic/Latino as an ethnic category. This table excludes Latinos from the racial categories and assigns them to a separate category. Hispanics/Latinos may be of any race.
Race / Ethnicity (NH = Non-Hispanic)	Pop 1980	Pop 1990	Pop 2000	Pop 2010	Pop 2020	% 1980	% 1990	% 2000	% 2010	% 2020
White alone (NH)	21,432	27,928	37,184	49,364	53,051	96.57%	96.66%	95.48%	93.91%	89.05%
Black or African American alone (NH)	544	588	672	963	1,072	2.45%	2.04%	1.73%	1.83%	1.80%
Native American or Alaska Native alone (NH)	35	95	138	154	193	0.16%	0.33%	0.35%	0.29%	0.32%
Asian alone (NH)	17	54	67	191	235	0.08%	0.19%	0.17%	0.36%	0.39%
Native Hawaiian or Pacific Islander alone (NH)	x	x	10	11	27	x	x	0.03%	0.02%	0.05%
Other race alone (NH)	29	8	17	28	177	0.13%	0.03%	0.04%	0.05%	0.30%
Mixed race or Multiracial (NH)	x	x	412	823	3,278	x	x	1.06%	1.57%	5.50%
Hispanic or Latino (any race)	136	219	444	1,032	1,541	0.61%	0.76%	1.14%	1.96%	2.59%
Total	22,193	28,892	38,944	52,566	59,574	100.00%	100.00%	100.00%	100.00%	100.00%

=== 2000 census ===
As of the census of 2000, there were 38,944 people, 13,851 households, and 10,554 families residing in the county. The population density was 62 inhabitants per square mile (24/km^{2}). There were 15,511 housing units at an average density of 25 units per square mile (9.7/km^{2}). The racial makeup of the county was 96.13% White, 1.74% Black or African American, 0.37% Native American, 0.17% Asian, 0.03% Pacific Islander, 0.43% from other races, and 1.14% from two or more races. Approximately 1.14% of the population were Hispanic or Latino of any race. 37.7% were of German, 17.0% American, 10.9% Irish and 7.4% English ancestry.

There were 13,851 households, out of which 40.00% had children under the age of 18 living with them, 61.50% were married couples living together, 10.10% had a female householder with no husband present, and 23.80% were non-families. 19.70% of all households were made up of individuals, and 7.70% had someone living alone who was 65 years of age or older. The average household size was 2.77 and the average family size was 3.17.

In the county, the population was spread out, with 30.00% under the age of 18, 8.10% from 18 to 24, 30.20% from 25 to 44, 21.00% from 45 to 64, and 10.80% who were 65 years of age or older. The median age was 34 years. For every 100 females there were 98.40 males. For every 100 females age 18 and over, there were 97.90 males.

The median income for a household in the county was $42,592, and the median income for a family was $47,747. Males had a median income of $35,564 versus $23,270 for females. The per capita income for the county was $17,149. About 6.20% of families and 8.30% of the population were below the poverty line, including 9.60% of those under age 18 and 9.00% of those age 65 or over.

== Education ==
=== Public schools ===
School districts include:

- Silex R-I School District – Silex
  - Silex Elementary School (K-06)
  - Silex High School (07-12)
- Elsberry R-II School District – Elsberry
  - Clarence Cannon Elementary School (PK-04)
  - Ida Cannon Middle School (05-08)
  - Elsberry High School (09-12)
- Lincoln County R-III School District – Troy
  - Early Childhood Education Center (Pre-K & PAT)
  - Boone Elementary School (K-05)
  - Claude Brown Elementary School (K-05)
  - Cuivre Park Elementary School (K-05)
  - Hawk Point Elementary School (K-05)
  - Lincoln Elementary School (K-05)
  - Main Street Elementary School (K-05)
  - William R. Cappel Elementary School (K-05)
  - Troy Middle School (06-08)
  - Troy South Middle School (06-08)
  - Ninth Grade Center (09)
  - Troy Buchanan High School (10-12)
  - New Horizons High School (10-12)
- Winfield R-IV School District – Winfield
  - Winfield Elementary School (PK-02)
  - Winfield Intermediate School (03-05)
  - Winfield Middle School (06-08)
  - Winfield High School (09-12)
- Wright City R-II School District - Wright City
  - Additionally, the Wright City R-II serves southern portions of Lincoln County.
- Pike County R-III School District
- Warren County R-III School District

=== Private schools ===
- First Baptist Christian Academy - Troy (K-08) - Baptist
- Immaculate Conception School – Old Monroe (K-08) – Roman Catholic
- NorthRoad Academy - Moscow Mills (K-08) - Baptist
- Sacred Heart School – Troy (K-08) – Roman Catholic
- St. Alphonsus School – Silex (PK-08) – Roman Catholic
- Troy Holiness School – Troy (K-12) – Methodist

=== Public libraries ===
- Powell Memorial Library

== Communities ==
=== Cities and villages ===
- Cave
- Chain of Rocks
- Elsberry
- Foley
- Fountain N' Lakes
- Hawk Point
- Moscow Mills
- Old Monroe
- Silex
- Troy (county seat)
- Truxton
- Whiteside
- Winfield

=== Unincorporated communities ===
- Apex
- Argentville
- Auburn
- Brevator
- Briscoe
- Brussells
- Cap au Gris
- Chantilly
- Corso
- Dameron
- Davis
- Ethlyn
- Fairview
- Famous
- Louisville
- Mackville
- Millwood
- New Hope
- Okete
- Olney
- South Troy

== Politics ==
=== Local ===
The Republican Party mostly controls politics at the local level in Lincoln County. Republicans hold all but four of the elected positions in the county.

Lincoln County, Missouri

Elected countywide officials
Assessor	Kevin L. Bishop	Republican
Circuit Clerk	Kathy Hall	Republican
County Clerk	Kenneth Schulte	Republican
Collector	Jessica Zumwalt	Republican
Commissioner (presiding)	Joe Kiamann	Republican
Commissioner (district 1)	Mike Mueller	Republican
Commissioner (district 2)	Matt Bass	Republican
Coroner	Ryan Parker	Republican
Prosecuting Attorney	Michael L. Wood	Republican
Public Administrator	Sandy Jung	Republican
Recorder	Tracy K. Martin	Republican
Sheriff	Rick Harrell	Republican
Surveyor	Donald “Tec” Parr	Democratic
Treasurer	Brenda O'Brien	Democratic

=== State ===
Past Gubernatorial Elections Results
Year	Republican	Democratic	Third Parties
2024	76.36% 24,149	21.37% 6,759	2.27% 719
2020	72.70% 21,014	24.62% 7,116	2.68% 775
2016	58.56% 14,536	37.68% 9,352	3.76% 934
2012	49.29% 11,092	47.64% 10,730	3.12% 703
2008	45.43% 10,589	52.33% 12,197	2.23% 521
2004	53.75% 10,626	44.64% 8,824	1.61% 318
2000	52.12% 8,282	44.26% 7,034	3.62% 575
1996	43.69% 5,507	53.93% 6,797	2.38% 300

Lincoln County is divided into two legislative districts in the Missouri House of Representatives.

- District 40 — Chad Perkins (R-Bowling Green). Consists of the northernmost section of the county.

Missouri House of Representatives — District 40 — Lincoln County (2020)
Party	Candidate	Votes	%	±%
Republican	Chad Perkins	270	97.12%	

Missouri House of Representatives — District 40 — Lincoln County (2018)
Party	Candidate	Votes	%	±%
Republican	Jim hansen	202	97.58%	

Missouri House of Representatives — District 40 — Lincoln County (2016)
Party	Candidate	Votes	%	±%
Republican	Jim Hansen	232	100.00%	+23.78

Missouri House of Representatives — District 40 — Lincoln County (2014)
Party	Candidate	Votes	%	±%
Republican	Jim Hansen	125	76.22%	+17.79
Democratic	Lowell Jackson	39	23.78%	−17.79

Missouri House of Representatives — District 40 — Lincoln County (2012)
Party	Candidate	Votes	%	±%
Republican	Jim Hansen	156	58.43%	
Democratic	Paul Quinn	111	41.57%	

- District 41 — Doyle Justus (R-Troy). Consists of most of the county and includes the communities of Cave, Foley Troy, Truxton, and Whiteside.

Missouri House of Representatives — District 41 — Lincoln County (2022)
Party	Candidate	Votes	%	±%
Republican	Doyle Justus	18,148	72.8%	

Missouri House of Representatives — District 41 — Lincoln County (2018)
Party	Candidate	Votes	%	±%
Republican	Randy Pietzman	10,612	68.57%	
Democratic	David Beckham	4,848	31.33%	

Missouri House of Representatives — District 41 — Lincoln County (2016)
Party	Candidate	Votes	%	±%
Republican	Randy Pietzman	15,609	100.00%	+38.21

Missouri House of Representatives — District 41 — Lincoln County (2014)
Party	Candidate	Votes	%	±%
Republican	Randy Pietzman	6,243	61.79%	+20.10
Democratic	Dan Dildine	3,861	38.21%	−20.10

Missouri House of Representatives — District 41 — Lincoln County (2012)
Party	Candidate	Votes	%	±%
Democratic	Ed Schieffer	9,589	58.31%	
Republican	Beverly Steiniger	6,857	41.69%	

- District 64 — Tony Lovasco (R- O'Fallon) Includes the southeast corner of the county and the communities of Chain of Rocks, Fountain N' Lakes, Moscow Mills, Old Monroe, and Winfield.

Missouri House of Representatives — District 64 — Lincoln County (2020)
Party	Candidate	Votes	%	±%
Republican	Tony Lovasco	5,786	75.90%	
Democratic	Aaliyah Bailey	1,829	23.99%	

Missouri House of Representatives — District 64 — Lincoln County (2018)
Party	Candidate	Votes	%	±%
Republican	Tony Lovasco	3,448	63.80%	
Democratic	Shawn Finklein	1,946	36.01%	

All of Lincoln County is a part of Missouri's 10th District in the Missouri Senate and is currently represented by Jeanie Riddle (R-Fulton).

Missouri Senate — District 10 — Lincoln County (2018)
Party	Candidate	Votes	%	±%
Republican	Jeanie Riddle	14,652	69.22%	
Democratic	Ayanna Shivers	6,490	30.66%	

Missouri Senate — District 10 — Lincoln County (2014)
Party	Candidate	Votes	%	±%
Republican	Jeanie Riddle	7,542	56.52%	
Democratic	Ed Scheiffer	5,802	44.48%	

United States presidential election results for Lincoln County, Missouri
Year	Republican		Democratic		Third party(ies)	
Year	No.	%	No.	%	No.	%
1888	1,628	40.57%	2,380	59.31%	5	0.12%
1892	1,380	35.15%	2,508	63.88%	38	0.97%
1896	1,564	34.12%	3,003	65.51%	17	0.37%
1900	1,563	35.47%	2,761	62.65%	83	1.88%
1904	1,462	38.12%	2,295	59.84%	78	2.03%
1908	1,620	38.51%	2,555	60.73%	32	0.76%
1912	1,258	33.17%	2,326	61.32%	209	5.51%
1916	1,642	39.66%	2,468	59.61%	30	0.72%
1920	3,209	46.45%	3,660	52.97%	40	0.58%
1924	2,563	41.63%	3,419	55.53%	175	2.84%
1928	2,722	44.71%	3,356	55.12%	10	0.16%
1932	1,604	26.46%	4,428	73.06%	29	0.48%
1936	2,258	32.61%	4,625	66.80%	41	0.59%
1940	3,035	40.57%	4,420	59.09%	25	0.33%
1944	2,910	43.45%	3,773	56.33%	15	0.22%
1948	2,135	33.70%	4,190	66.13%	11	0.17%
1952	3,458	46.19%	4,020	53.69%	9	0.12%
1956	3,114	43.83%	3,990	56.17%	0	0.00%
1960	3,471	47.78%	3,793	52.22%	0	0.00%
1964	2,271	31.26%	4,993	68.74%	0	0.00%
1968	3,185	41.78%	3,142	41.21%	1,297	17.01%
1972	5,127	64.81%	2,784	35.19%	0	0.00%
1976	3,581	43.99%	4,473	54.95%	86	1.06%
1980	4,963	53.17%	4,110	44.03%	262	2.81%
1984	6,137	65.10%	3,290	34.90%	0	0.00%
1988	5,305	53.38%	4,605	46.34%	28	0.28%
1992	3,718	29.13%	5,453	42.72%	3,594	28.16%
1996	4,897	38.83%	5,644	44.75%	2,070	16.41%
2000	8,549	53.72%	6,961	43.74%	403	2.53%
2004	11,316	57.04%	8,368	42.18%	155	0.78%
2008	12,924	54.72%	10,234	43.33%	461	1.95%
2012	14,332	62.93%	7,734	33.96%	710	3.12%
2016	18,159	72.31%	5,575	22.20%	1,380	5.49%
2020	21,848	75.29%	6,607	22.77%	563	1.94%
2024	24,866	77.38%	6,908	21.50%	359	1.12%

=== Federal ===
U.S. Senate — Missouri — (2018)
Party	Candidate	Votes	%	±%
Republican	Josh Hawley	13,140	61.05%	
Democratic	Claire McCaskill	7,391	34.34%	
Independent	Craig O'Dear	540	2.51%	
Libertarian	Japheth Campbell	306	1.42%	
Green	Jo Crain	125	0.58%	

U.S. Senate — Missouri — (2016)
Party	Candidate	Votes	%	±%
Republican	Roy Blunt	14,061	56.70%	+8.57
Democratic	Jason Kander	9,264	37.35%	−7.97
Libertarian	Jonathan Dine	751	3.03%	−3.52
Green	Johnathan McFarland	305	1.23%	+1.23
Constitution	Fred Ryman	419	1.69%	+1.69

U.S. Senate — Missouri — (2012)
Party	Candidate	Votes	%	±%
Democratic	Claire McCaskill	10,225	45.32%	
Republican	Todd Akin	10,860	48.13%	
Libertarian	Jonathan Dine	1.479	6.55%	

All of Lincoln County is included in Missouri's 3rd Congressional District and is currently represented by Blaine Luetkemeyer (R-St. Elizabeth) in the U.S. House of Representatives.

U.S. House of Representatives — Missouri's 3rd Congressional District — Lincoln County (2020)
Party	Candidate	Votes	%	±%
Republican	Blaine Luetkemeyer	21,592	75.88%	
Democratic	Megan Rezabek	6,179	21.72%	
Libertarian	Leonard J Steinman II	665	2.34%	

U.S. House of Representatives — Missouri's 3rd Congressional District — Lincoln County (2018)
Party	Candidate	Votes	%	±%
Republican	Blaine Luetkemeyer	14,475	68.22%	
Democratic	Katy Geppert	6,232	29.37%	
Libertarian	Donald Stolle	495	2.33%	

U.S. House of Representatives — Missouri's 3rd Congressional District — Lincoln County (2016)
Party	Candidate	Votes	%	±%
Republican	Blaine Luetkemeyer	16,826	69.05%	+0.87
Democratic	Kevin Miller	6,429	26.38%	−0.52
Libertarian	Dan Hogan	775	3.18%	−1.74
Constitution	Doanita Simmons	338	1.39%	+1.39

U.S. House of Representatives — Missouri’s 3rd Congressional District — Lincoln County (2014)
Party	Candidate	Votes	%	±%
Republican	Blaine Luetkemeyer	8,804	68.18%	+7.45
Democratic	Courtney Denton	3,473	26.90%	−8.15
Libertarian	Steven Hedrick	635	4.92%	+0.70

U.S. House of Representatives — Missouri's 3rd Congressional District — Lincoln County (2012)
Party	Candidate	Votes	%	±%
Republican	Blaine Luetkemeyer	13,171	60.73%	
Democratic	Eric Mayer	7,601	35.05%	
Libertarian	Steven Wilson	916	4.22%	

== See also ==
- National Register of Historic Places listings in Lincoln County, Missouri
