= National Register of Historic Places listings in Warren County, Missouri =

Location of Warren County in Missouri

This is a list of the National Register of Historic Places listings in Warren County, Missouri.

This is intended to be a complete list of the properties and districts on the National Register of Historic Places in Warren County, Missouri, United States. Latitude and longitude coordinates are provided for many National Register properties and districts; these locations may be seen together in a map.

There are 8 properties and districts listed on the National Register in the county. Another 2 properties were once listed but have been removed.

This National Park Service list is complete through NPS recent listings posted May 23, 2025.

== Current listings ==
	Name on the Register	Image	Date listed	Location	City or town	Description
1	Herman H. Fortmann Building	Herman H. Fortmann Building	May 5, 2006 (#06000332)	207 Depot St. 38°37′48″N 91°03′44″W	Marthasville	
2	Glosemeyer General Store	Glosemeyer General Store	January 29, 2018 (#100002039)	16011 Concord Hill Rd. 38°39′00″N 91°08′05″W	Marthasville	
3	Marthasville Hardware Building	Marthasville Hardware Building	February 14, 2008 (#08000020)	203 Depot St. 38°37′47″N 91°03′42″W	Marthasville	
4	Ernst Schowengerdt House	Ernst Schowengerdt House	October 3, 1980 (#80002397)	308 E. Boone's Lick Rd. 38°48′39″N 91°08′40″W	Warrenton	
5	Southwestern Bell Repeater Station-Wright City	Southwestern Bell Repeater Station-Wright City	February 13, 2007 (#07000039)	Northeastern corner of the junction of North Service Rd. and Bell Rd. 38°49′50″N 91°02′40″W	Wright City	
6	Starke-Meinershagen-Boeke Rural Historic District	Starke-Meinershagen-Boeke Rural Historic District	January 7, 1998 (#97001611)	Route 94, 5 miles west of Marthasville; 38°37′36″N 91°04′47″W	Marthasville	
7	Treloar Mercantile and Farmer's Bank of Treloar HD	Treloar Mercantile and Farmer's Bank of Treloar HD	February 16, 2022 (#100007419)	2 MKT St. 38°38′38″N 91°11′19″W	Treloar	
8	Warren County Courthouse and Circuit Court Building		March 17, 1972 (#72000733)	Main St. 38°48′39″N 91°08′57″W	Warrenton	Demolished.

== Former listings ==
	Name on the Register	Image	Date listed	Date removed	Location	City or town	Description
1	Borgmann Mill		November 10, 1970 (#70000351)	December 19, 1994	5 miles east of Marthasville on County Road D 38°39′03″N 90°51′18″W	Marthasville	Delisted due to relocation in 1975.
2	Flanders Callaway House		July 29, 1969 (#69000127)	December 19, 1994	1 mile south of Marthasville off Route 94; 38°39′03″N 90°51′18″W	Marthasville	Delisted due to relocation in 1979.

== See also ==
- List of National Historic Landmarks in Missouri
- National Register of Historic Places listings in Missouri
