= Eastern Missouri Conference =

High school athletic conference in eastern central Missouri, United States

- Association: MSHSAA
- No. of teams: 11
- Region: Eastern Central Missouri
- Website: www.easternmissouri.org

The Eastern Missouri Conference is a high school athletic conference comprising small-size high schools located in eastern central Missouri. The conference members are located in Audrain, Callaway, Lincoln, Montgomery, Pike, Ralls and Warren counties.

== Members ==
School name	Mascot	Colors	City	County	School type
Bowling Green	Bobcats		Bowling Green	Pike	Public
Clopton	Hawks		Clarksville	Pike	Public
Elsberry	Indians		Elsberry	Lincoln	Public
Louisiana	Bulldogs		Louisiana	Pike	Public
Mark Twain	Tigers		Center	Ralls	Public
Montgomery County	Wildcats		Montgomery City	Montgomery	Public
North Callaway	Thunderbirds		Kingdom City	Callaway	Public
Silex	Owls		Silex	Lincoln	Public
Van-Far	Indians		Vandalia	Audrain	Public
Wellsville-Middletown	Tigers		Wellsville	Montgomery	Public
Wright City	Wildcats		Wright City	Warren	Public
