= Kochs Creek =

Stream in Warren County, Missouri, U.S.

Kochs Creek is a stream in Warren County in the U.S. state of Missouri.

The stream headwaters arise at 38°40′38″N 91°12′12″W and it flows south to enter the Missouri River floodplain one half mile west of the community of Treloar. The stream turns to the east passes under Missouri Route 94 and continues within the floodplain entering Peers Slough approximately one mile west of Peers at 38°38′05″N 91°09′27″W.

A variant name was "Kocks Branch". The creek has the name of the local Kock family.

== See also ==
- List of rivers of Missouri
