= Loutre Slough =

Stream in the American state of Missouri

Loutre Slough is a stream located in southeastern Montgomery and southwestern Warren counties in the U.S. state of Missouri. It is a tributary of the Missouri River.

The waterway lies within the Missouri River Valley. The source is northwest of Hermann at 38°42′39″N 91°28′15″W. The waterway is interrupted by the dikes along the Loutre River south of McKittrick. The stream crosses under Missouri Route 19 south of McKittrick and runs semi-parallel to Missouri Route 94 past the community of Case where it is joined by the waters of Massie Creek. The stream flows on to the east-southeast to its confluence with the Missouri River just south of the community of Gore at 38°42′35″N 91°19′31″W.

Loutre is a name derived from the French meaning "otter".

== See also ==
- List of rivers of Missouri
