= Massie Creek =

Stream in the American state of Missouri

Massas Creek is a stream in eastern Montgomery and southwestern Warren counties in the U.S. state of Missouri. It is a tributary of Loutre Slough.

The stream headwaters arise in eastern Montgomery County just to the south of Jonesburg and Interstate 70 at 38°50′49″N 91°17′57″W. The stream flows south to southwest into Warren County to its confluence with the Loutre Slough at 38°43′59″N 91°22′16″W within the Missouri River valley just east of the community of Case and after crossing under Missouri Route 94.

Variant names include "Massas Creek", "Masses Creek", "Masseys Creek", and "Massies Creek". The creek most likely has the name of Peter Massie, an early settler.

== See also ==
- List of rivers of Missouri
