= Cullum Branch =

Stream in the US state of Missouri

Coordinates: 38.7108795°N 91.3176575°W

Cullum Branch is a stream in Warren County in the U.S. state of Missouri.

A variant spelling was "Cullom Branch". The stream has the name of Gram Cullom, a pioneer citizen.

== See also ==
- List of rivers of Missouri
