= Innsbrook =

Innsbrook may refer to:

- Innsbrook, Missouri, a village in Warren County, Missouri, United States
- Innsbrook, Virginia, a census-designated place in Henrico County, Virginia, United States

== See also ==
- Innisbrook Resort and Golf Club, a hotel and country club resort in the southeastern United States
- Innsbruck, the capital of Tyrol and fifth-largest city in Austria
- "Innsbruck, ich muss dich lassen", a German Renaissance song
