= Morsey, Missouri =

Extinct hamlet in Missouri, U.S.

Coordinates: 38.9511546°N 91.2229297°W

Morsey is an extinct town in Warren County, in the U.S. state of Missouri.

A post office called Morsey was established in 1891, and remained in operation until 1908. The community has the name of the local Morsey family.
