= Wilsons Branch =

Stream in the US state of Missouri

Coordinates: 38.749490°N 91.292101°W

Wilsons Branch is a stream in Warren County in the U.S. state of Missouri. It is a tributary of Little Lost Creek.

Wilsons Branch has the name of George Wilson, Sr., the original owner of the site.

== See also ==
- List of rivers of Missouri
