= Marthasville =

Marthasville is or was the name of two places in the United States:

- Marthasville, Missouri
- Marthasville, Georgia, briefly the name of Atlanta from 1843 to 1845
