= Washington High School (Missouri) =

American high school in Missouri

Location
- 600 Blue Jay Drive; Washington, Missouri 63090; United States; 38.5480°N 91.0094°W

Information
- Type: Public high school
- School district: School District of Washington
- Principal: Eric Turner
- Staff: 79.14 (on an FTE basis)
- Grades: 9–12
- Enrollment: 1,246 (2023–24)
- Student to teacher ratio: 15.74
- Colors: Blue and white
- Nickname: Blue Jays
- Website: whs.washington.k12.mo.us

Washington High School (WHS) is public high school in Washington, Missouri that is part of the School District of Washington.

== History ==
Washington High School was established in 1900 in the former private high school building, with its class of 1900–1901 having only five graduates, and 47 students total.

Following the case Brown v. Board of Education, Washington Schools desegregated in 1954 with Clifford Aitch being the first African-American graduate in 1959. Aitch would later teach physical education in the Washington School District as its first African-American teacher.

The new Washington High School was erected in 1956, during the tenure of superintendent CJ Burger who would later name the school’s auditorium, with its first principal being Russel C. Nix. The new school had been in the works for years, and had even received funding from the graduating class of 1949.

Dr. Donald Northington served as superintendent of Washington Schools from 1963 to 1990, and the school’s main lobby is dedicated as “Northington Lobby” in his honor.

Russel C. Nix served as the first principal of the new Washington High School and is the dedicatee of the library and cafeteria addition known as “Nix Cafeteria.”

== Boundary ==
The district includes portions of Franklin County. In that county, in addition to Washington, the district includes small pieces of Gray Summit and Villa Ridge.

The district extends into St. Charles County where it includes Augusta and a portion of the Defiance census-designated place.

The district also extends into Warren County, where it includes Marthasville and Three Creeks.

== Demographics ==
The racial/ethnic breakdown of the 1,348 students enrolled for the 2021–2022 school year was:

- White – 93.7%
- Hispanic – 2.4%
- Multiracial – 1.9%
- Black – 1.0%
- Asian/Pacific islander – 0.7%

The male/female ratio for 2021–2022 was:

- Male – 51.6%
- Female – 48.4%

In addition, 13.7% of the students were eligible for free or reduced lunch.

== Activities ==
For the 2023–2024 school year, the school offered 25 activities approved by the Missouri State High School Activities Association (MSHSAA): baseball, boys and girls basketball, cheer, boys and girls cross country, dance, football, boys and girls golf, orchestra band and vocal music, scholar bowl, boys and girls soccer, softball, boys and girls swimming, girls tennis, boys and girls track and field, girls volleyball, and boys and girls wrestling.

The Washington Blue Jays have won the following state championships:

- Football: 1973
- Scholar bowl: 2017
- Softball: 2021, 2023

Student activities:

ΜΑΘ* Football
- Girls and boys swimming
- Softball
- Wrestling
- Soccer
- Basketball
- Cheerleading
- Golf
- Volleyball
- Baseball
- Track
- Cross Country

== Notable alumni ==
- Whitney Wegman-Wood – actress and screenwriter
- Scott Suggs, class of '08 – professional basketball player, Mr. Show-Me Basketball (2008).
