= Abattis, Missouri =

Extinct hamlet in Missouri, U.S.

Coordinates: 38°49′1.16″N 91°23′30.58″W

Abattis is an extinct town in Warren County, Missouri, United States.

A post office called Abattis was established in 1878, and remained in operation until 1904. It is unclear why the name Abattis was applied to this community.
