= Lepp Hollow =

Valley in Missouri, United States

Coordinates: 38.796434°N 91.312935°W

Lepp Hollow is a valley in Warren County in the U.S. state of Missouri.

Lepp Hollow has the name of the Lepp family, original owners of the site.
