= Clarks Hollow =

Valley in Missouri, United States

Coordinates: 38.7622686°N 91.2237644°W

Clarks Hollow is a valley in Warren County in the U.S. state of Missouri.

Clarks Hollow has the name of the local Clark family.
