= Ernst Schowengerdt House =

Historic house in Missouri, United States

- U.S. National Register of Historic Places
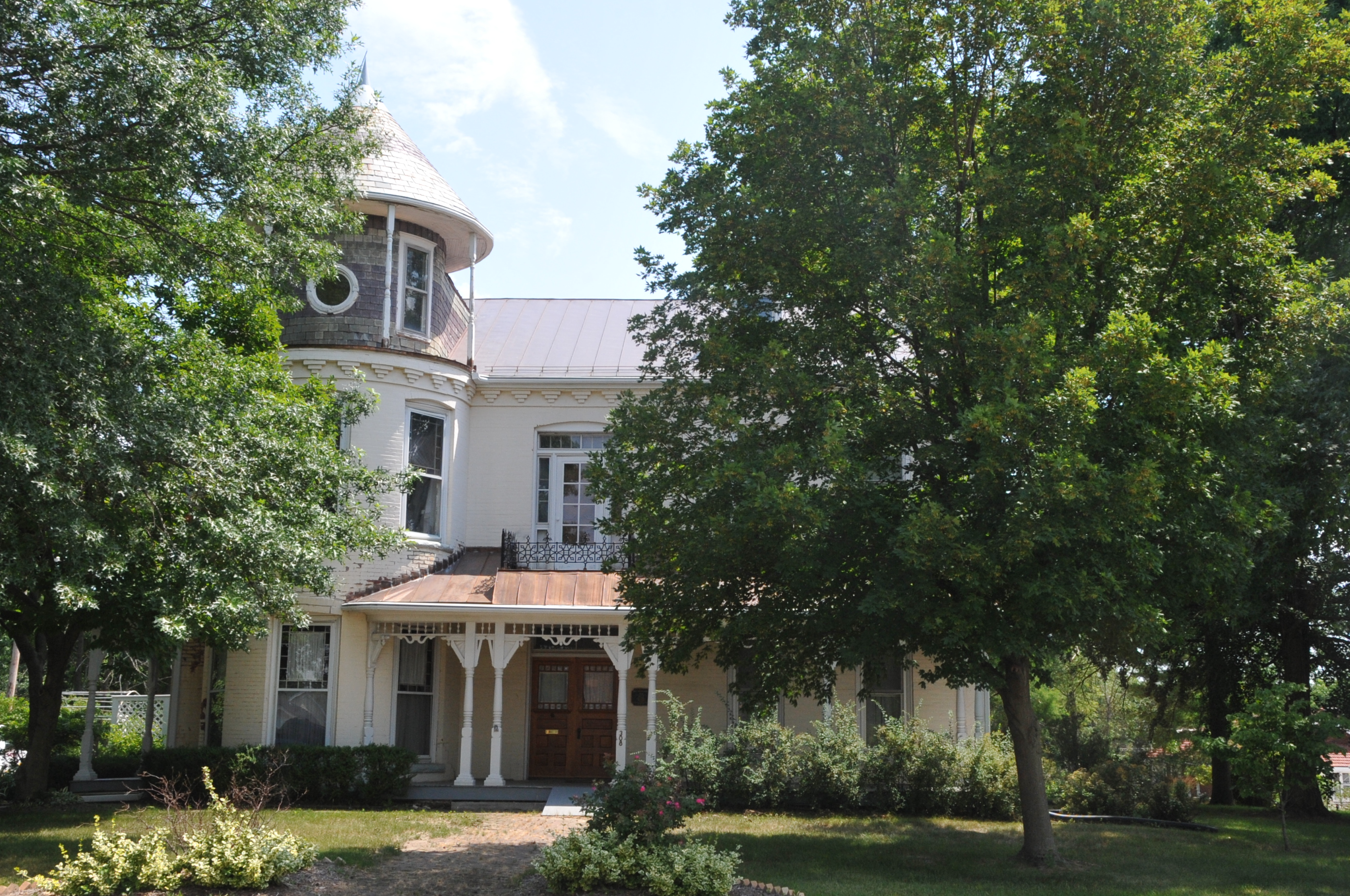
- Ernst Schowengerdt House, July 2013

- Location within Missouri Location within the United States
- Location: 308 E. Boone's Lick Rd., Warrenton, Missouri
- Coordinates: 38°48′39″N 91°8′40″W
- Area: 1.8 acres (0.73 ha)
- Built: 1866
- Architectural style: Classical Revival, Queen Anne
- NRHP reference No.: 80002397
- Added to NRHP: October 3, 1980

Ernst Schowengerdt House is a historic home located at Warrenton, Warren County, Missouri. The original section was built in 1866, as a two-story, five bay brick dwelling with two Classical Revival style porches. It was extensively remodeled in the Queen Anne style in 1892–1893. The remodeling added a three-story round tower emerging halfway through the main block of the house. The building houses the Warren County Historical Society.

It was listed on the National Register of Historic Places in 1980.
