= Matson, Missouri =

Unincorporated community in Missouri, U.S.

Coordinates: 38°36′29″N 90°47′49″W

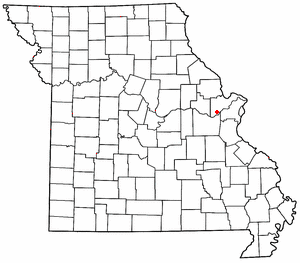

Matson is an unincorporated community in southern St. Charles County, Missouri, United States. It is located approximately three miles south of Defiance on Route 94 and is near the Missouri River.

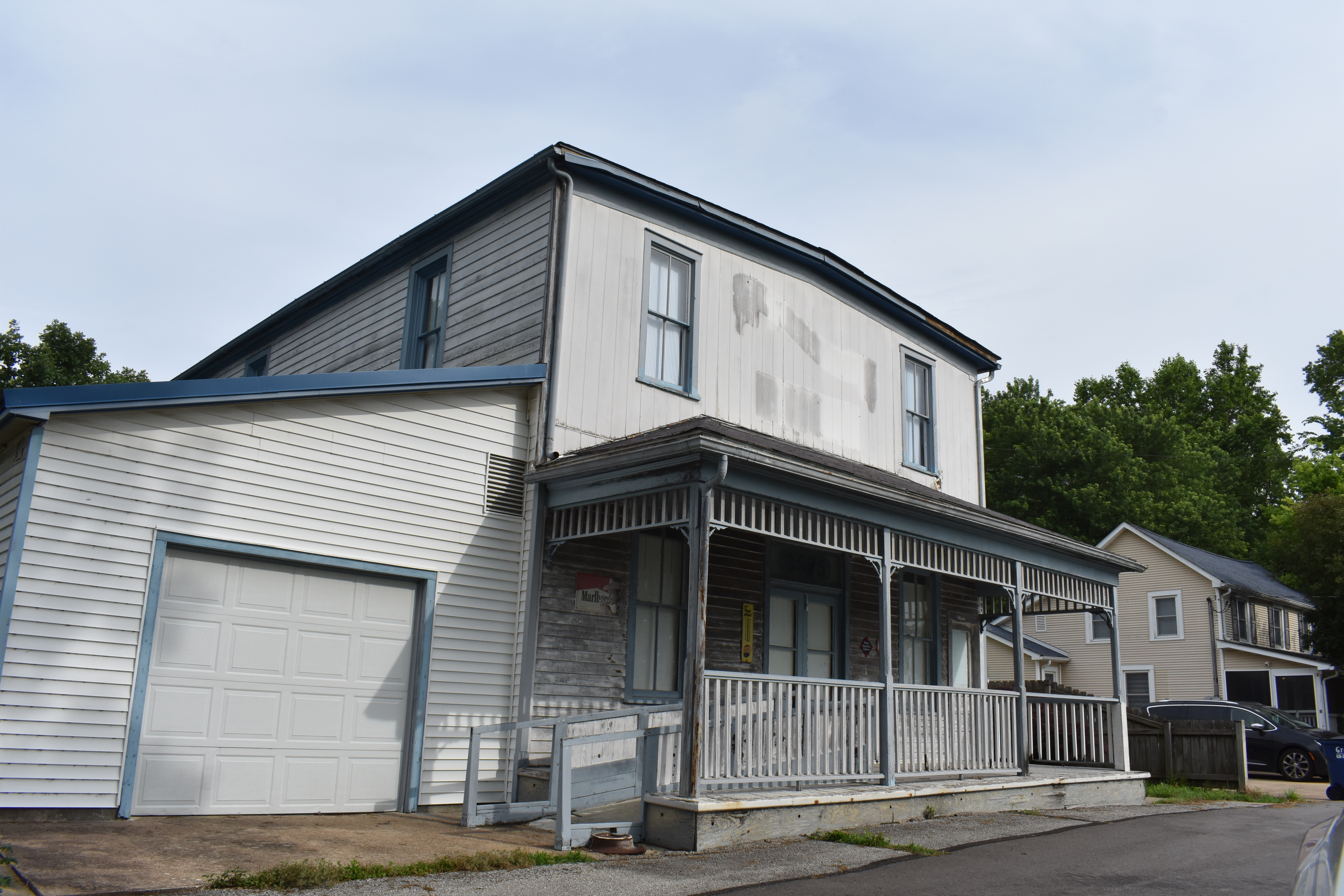
Buildings in Matson

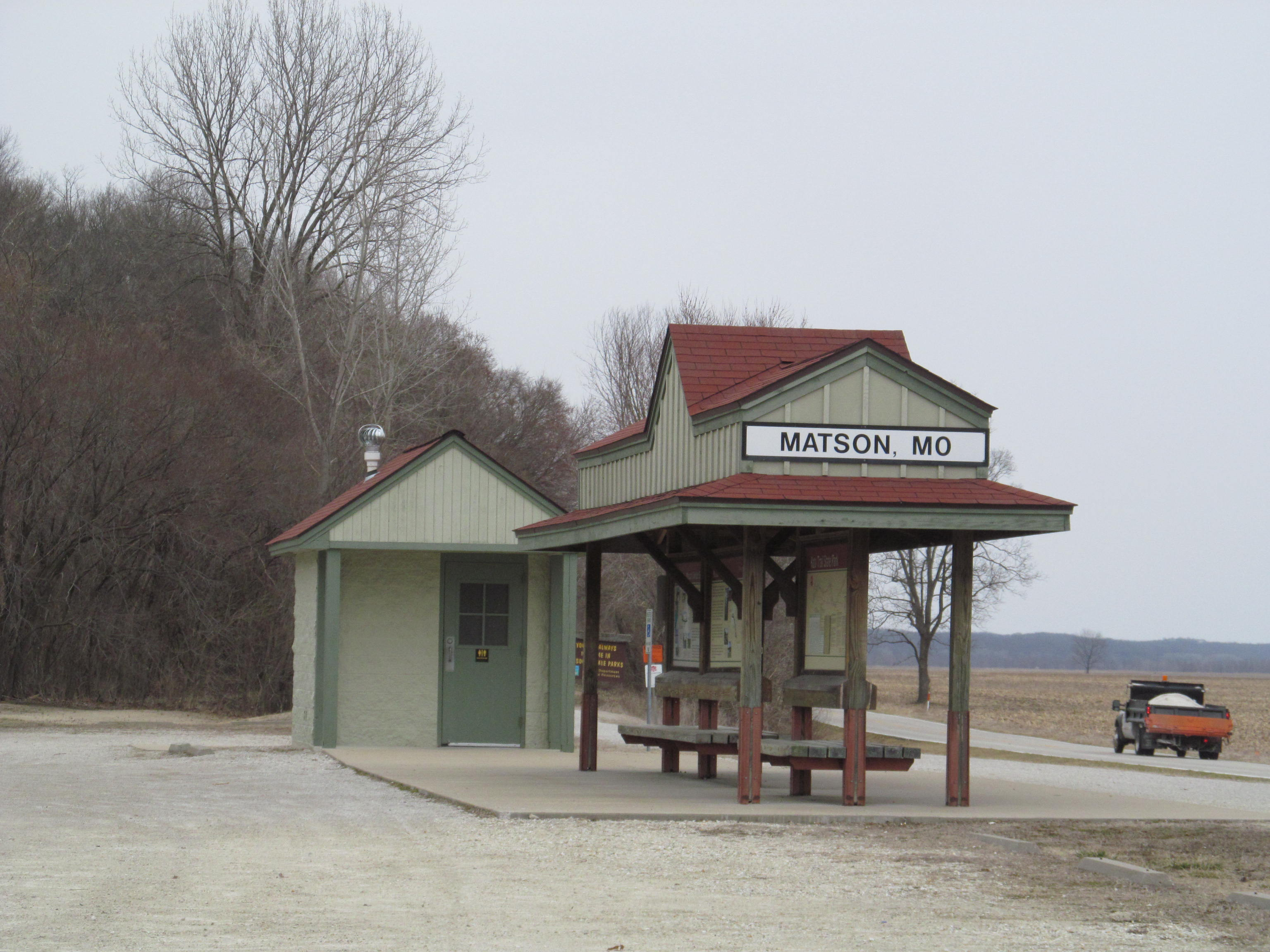
Matson's Trailhead on the Katy Trail

== History ==
A post office called Matson was established in 1893, and remained in operation until 1971. The community most likely has the name of Abraham Matson, a pioneer citizen.
