= Peers, Missouri =

Unincorporated community in Missouri, U.S.

Coordinates: 38°38′03″N 91°07′19″W

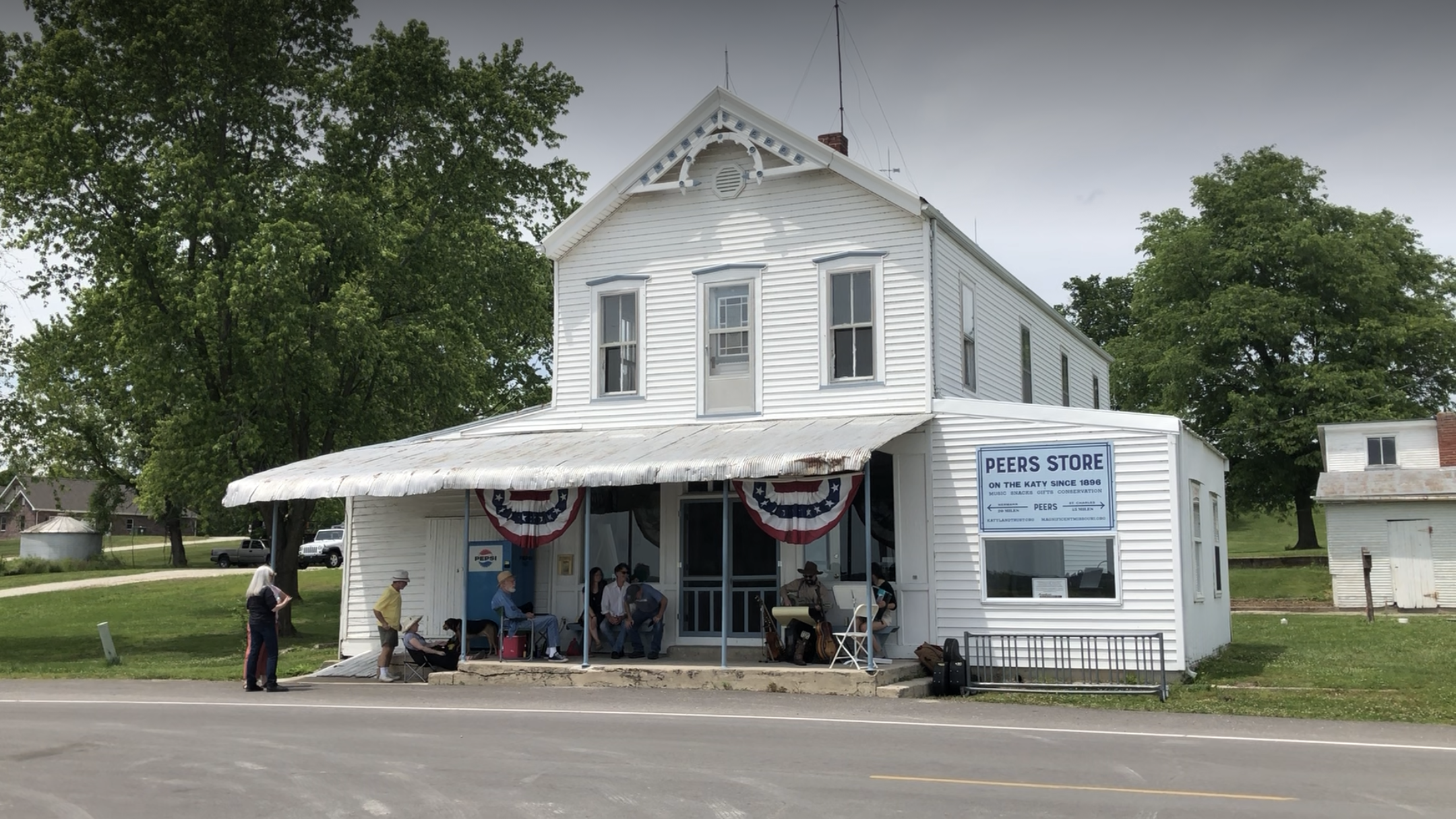
Peers Store in Peers, Missouri, during a small Ryan Koenig concert

Peers is an unincorporated community in southern Warren County, in the U.S. state of Missouri.

== Location ==
The community is on the north edge of the Missouri River floodplain and Treloar is four miles to the west on Missouri Route 94.

== History ==
Peers was platted in 1892 when the railroad was extended to that point. A post office called Peers was established in 1893, and remained in operation until 1973. The community has the name of Charles E. Peers, a railroad promoter.
