= Three Creeks, Missouri =

- Village
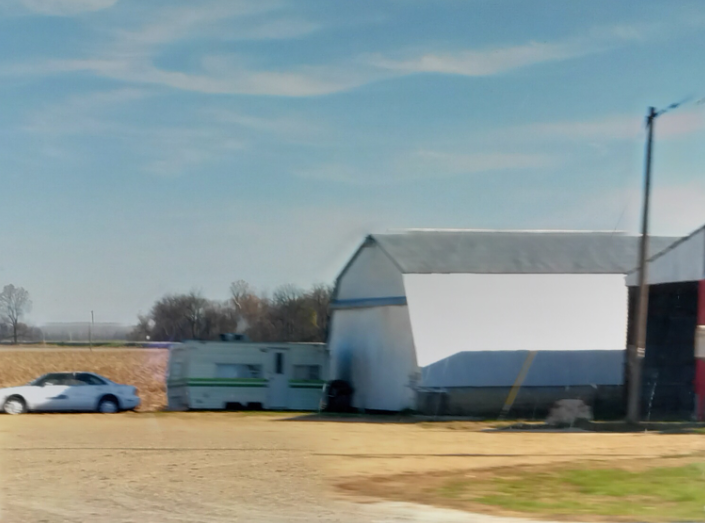
- Three Creeks in 2024

- Location within Missouri
- Coordinates: 38°34′16″N 90°59′48″W
- Country: United States
- State: Missouri
- County: Warren

Area
  - Total: 4.89 sq mi (12.66 km^{2})
  - Land: 4.78 sq mi (12.37 km^{2})
  - Water: 0.11 sq mi (0.29 km^{2})
- Elevation: 486 ft (148 m)

Population (2020)
  - Total: 8
  - Density: 1.7/sq mi (0.65/km^{2})
- Time zone: UTC-6 (Central (CST))
  - Summer (DST): UTC-5 (CDT)
- ZIP code: 63357
- Area code: 636
- GNIS feature ID: 2632394

Three Creeks (also known as Three Creeks Village) is a village in Warren County, Missouri, United States. Three Creeks was incorporated on November 4, 2008 and had an estimated population of 4 in 2009. As of the 2020 census, its population had risen to 8.

== Geography ==
According to the United States Census Bureau, the village has a total area of 4.89 square miles (12.67 km^{2}), of which 4.78 square miles (12.38 km^{2}) is land and 0.11 square miles (0.28 km^{2}) is water.

== Demographics ==
Historical population
Census	Pop.	Note	%±
2010	6		—
2020	8		33.3%
U.S. Decennial Census

=== 2010 census ===
As of the census of 2010, there were 6 people, 3 households, and 3 families residing in the village. The population density was 1.3 inhabitants per square mile (0.5/km^{2}). There were 3 housing units at an average density of 0.6 per square mile (0.2/km^{2}). The racial makeup of the village was 100.0% White.

There were 3 households, of which 100.0% were married couples living together. 0.0% of all households were made up of individuals. The average household size was 2.00 and the average family size was 2.00.

The median age in the village was 76.5 years. 0.0% of residents were under the age of 18; 0.0% were between the ages of 18 and 24; 33.3% were from 25 to 44; 0.0% were from 45 to 64; and 66.7% were 65 years of age or older. The gender makeup of the village was 50.0% male and 50.0% female.

== Education ==
It is in the School District of Washington. The comprehensive high school of the district is Washington High School.
