= Macedonia Neighborhood, Missouri =

Unincorporated community in Missouri, U.S.

Coordinates: 38°45′40″N 91°11′57″W

Macedonia is an unincorporated community in Warren County, in the U.S. state of Missouri.

Macedonia took its name from a nearby Methodist church, which in turn was named after the Greek region of Macedonia.
