= Treloar, Missouri =

Unincorporated community in Missouri, U.S.

- Unincorporated community
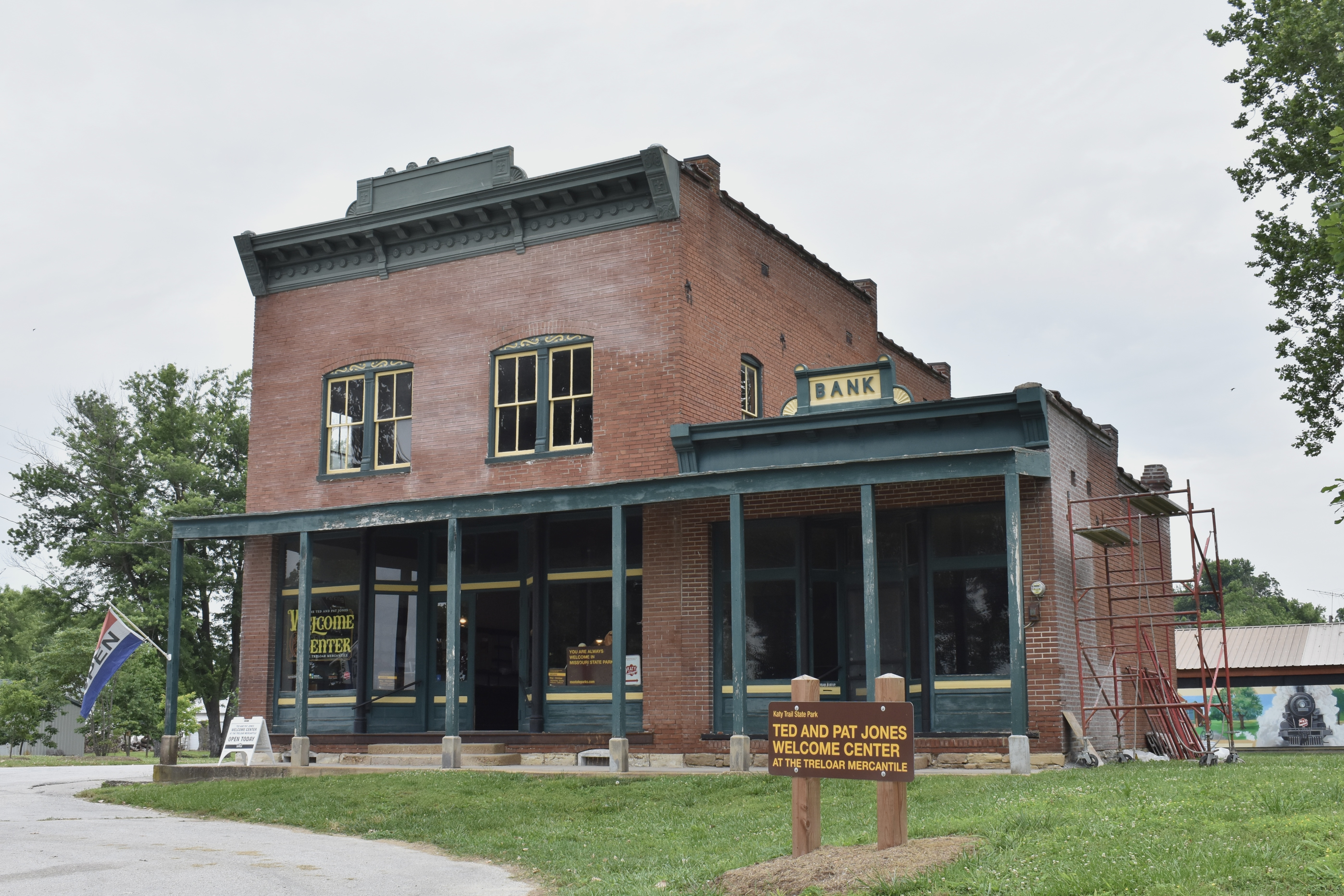
- Treloar Mercantile Building

- Location within Missouri Location within the United States
- Coordinates: 38°38′40″N 91°11′17″W
- Country: United States
- State: Missouri
- County: St. Charles
- Time zone: UTC-6 (Central (CST))
  - Summer (DST): UTC-5 (CDT)
- ZIP Code: 63378
- Area code: 636

Treloar is an unincorporated community in southern Warren County, Missouri, United States. It is located on the north edge of the Missouri River floodplain and Kochs Creek enters the floodplain just west of the community. Its tributary, Stuecken Branch, also flows through the community. Route 94 passes just south of the community and Warrenton is twelve miles to the north.

== History ==
A post office called Treloar has been in operation since 1897. The community has the name of William M. Treloar, a state legislator.
