= Defiance, Missouri =

Community in St. Charles County, Missouri, U.S.

Defiance
- Unincorporated community and census-designated place
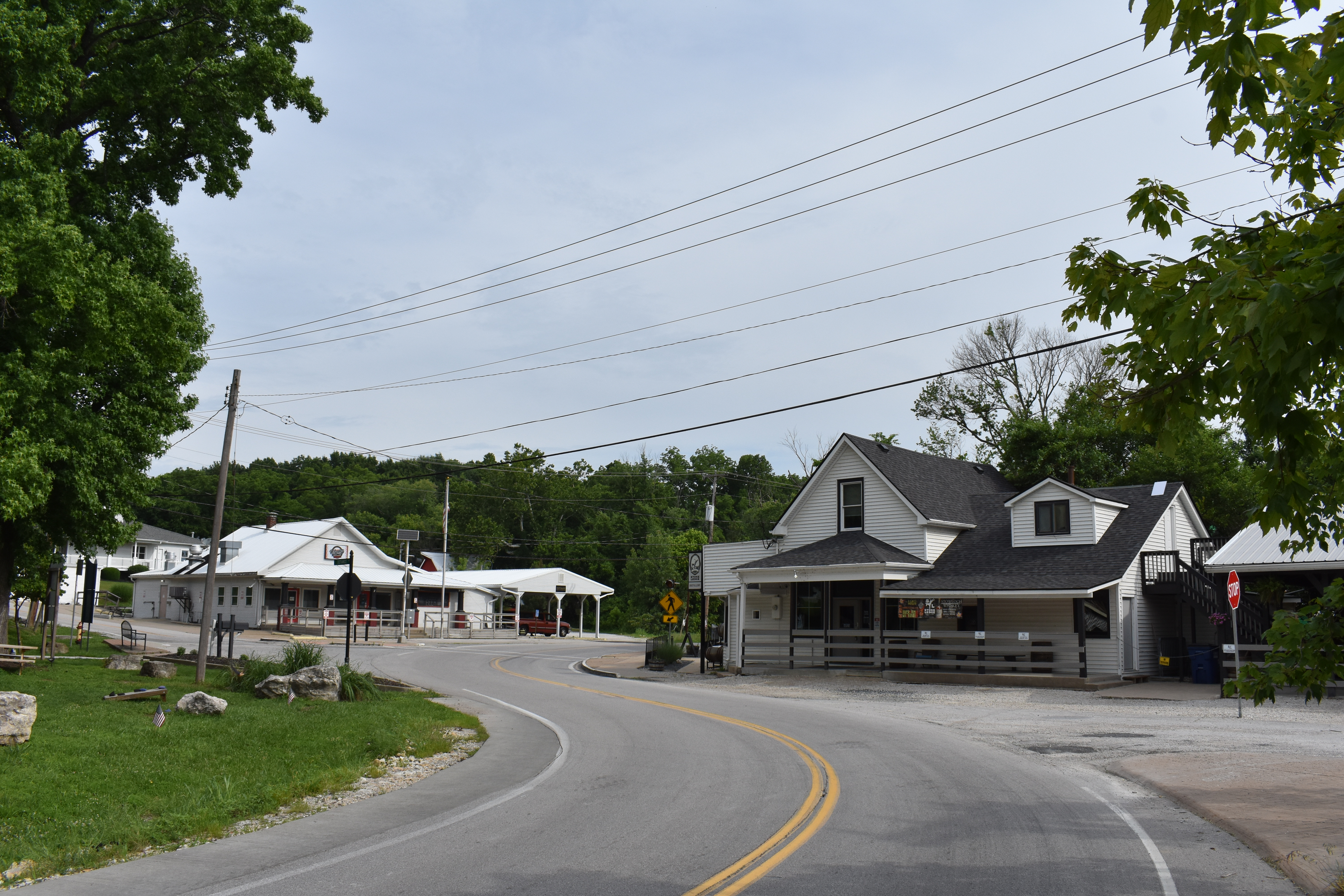
- Defiance

- Location within the state of Missouri
- Coordinates: 38°37′56″N 90°46′42″W
- Country: United States
- State: Missouri
- County: Saint Charles

Area
  - Total: 56.120 sq mi (145.350 km^{2})
  - Land: 54.760 sq mi (141.828 km^{2})
  - Water: 1.360 sq mi (3.522 km^{2})

Population (2020)
  - Total: 159
  - Density: 2.90/sq mi (1.12/km^{2})
- Time zone: UTC-6 (Central (CST))
  - Summer (DST): UTC-5 (CDT)
- ZIP codes: 63341
- FIPS code: 29-18910

Defiance is an unincorporated community and census-designated place in Saint Charles County, Missouri, United States. As of the 2020 census, the population was 159.

== History ==
Defiance was struck hard in the Tornado outbreak of December 10–11, 2021, by a tornado rated EF3. One person was killed.

== Situation ==
The Katy Trail State Park runs through Defiance near the Missouri River. This was the final home of frontiersman Daniel Boone, who settled in the Femme Osage Valley in 1799 after receiving a Spanish land grant. The hamlet was not named during Boone's life.

The Daniel Boone Home, Daniel Boone Hays House, and Isaac McCormick House are listed on the National Register of Historic Places. The Wolf-Ruebeling House is formerly listed.

== Etymology ==
The community was named in the late 1800s when the Katy Railroad arrived. Initially, the town was to be called Parsons, after the landowner. Because there was already a Parsons, Kansas on the Katy line, settlers considered other names, including Missouriton and Bluff City, before deciding on Defiance because of the hamlet's defiance of rival Matson to get a station on the line.

== Characteristics ==
From here west to Marthasville are numerous wineries; SH 94 is sometimes called the "Missouri Weinstrasse". The area is part of the Missouri Rhineland, where vineyards are cultivated on both sides of the Missouri River.

== In popular culture ==
Defiance was used as the name for the new settlement on top of the ruins of St. Louis, Missouri, in the television series of the same name. The series was produced by Universal Cable Productions, in transmedia collaboration with Trion Worlds who have released an MMORPG video game of the same name that is tied into the series world and mythology (but did not take place in the titular city).

In Volume 2 of the webcomic series, Lackadaisy by Tracy J. Butler, two of the main characters, Rocky Rickaby and Ivy Pepper, travel to a farm in Defiance, Missouri.

== Education ==
Defiance is covered by the Francis Howell School District with a small portion of the CDP attending the School District of Washington. Most students attend Daniel Boone Elementary School in nearby New Melle, Missouri, Francis Howell Middle School in Weldon Spring, Missouri and Francis Howell High School.

The comprehensive high school of the Washington school district is Washington High School.

== See also ==
- Missouri Rhineland
