= Warren County Courthouse and Circuit Court Building =

- U.S. National Register of Historic Places
- U.S. Historic district
- Location within Missouri Location within the United States
- Location: Main St., Warrenton, Missouri
- Coordinates: 38°48′39″N 91°8′57″W
- Area: 9.9 acres (4.0 ha)
- Built: 1869
- Architect: Brady William; Conrad, Julius, & Co.
- Architectural style: Classical Revival
- NRHP reference No.: 72000733
- Added to NRHP: March 17, 1972

Warren County Courthouse and Circuit Court Building were two historic government buildings and a national historic district located at Warrenton, Warren County, Missouri. They were two brick hipped roofed buildings. It was listed on the National Register of Historic Places in 1972. The buildings have been demolished.

== History ==
The courthouse was built between 1869 and 1871 and was a two-story, Classical Revival style building. It had a symmetrical plan, cast-iron columns, rounded-arch windows, recessed arch entrance doors, and cupola. The Circuit Court Building was built in 1866 and was a two-story building with iron shutters.
