= Stuecken Branch =

Stream in the US state of Missouri

Coordinates: 38.644493°N 91.187373°W

Stuecken Branch is a stream in Warren County in the U.S. state of Missouri.

Stuecken Branch most likely has the name of one Mr. Stuecken, the original owner of the site.

== See also ==
- List of rivers of Missouri
