= School District of Washington =

School district in Missouri, U.S.

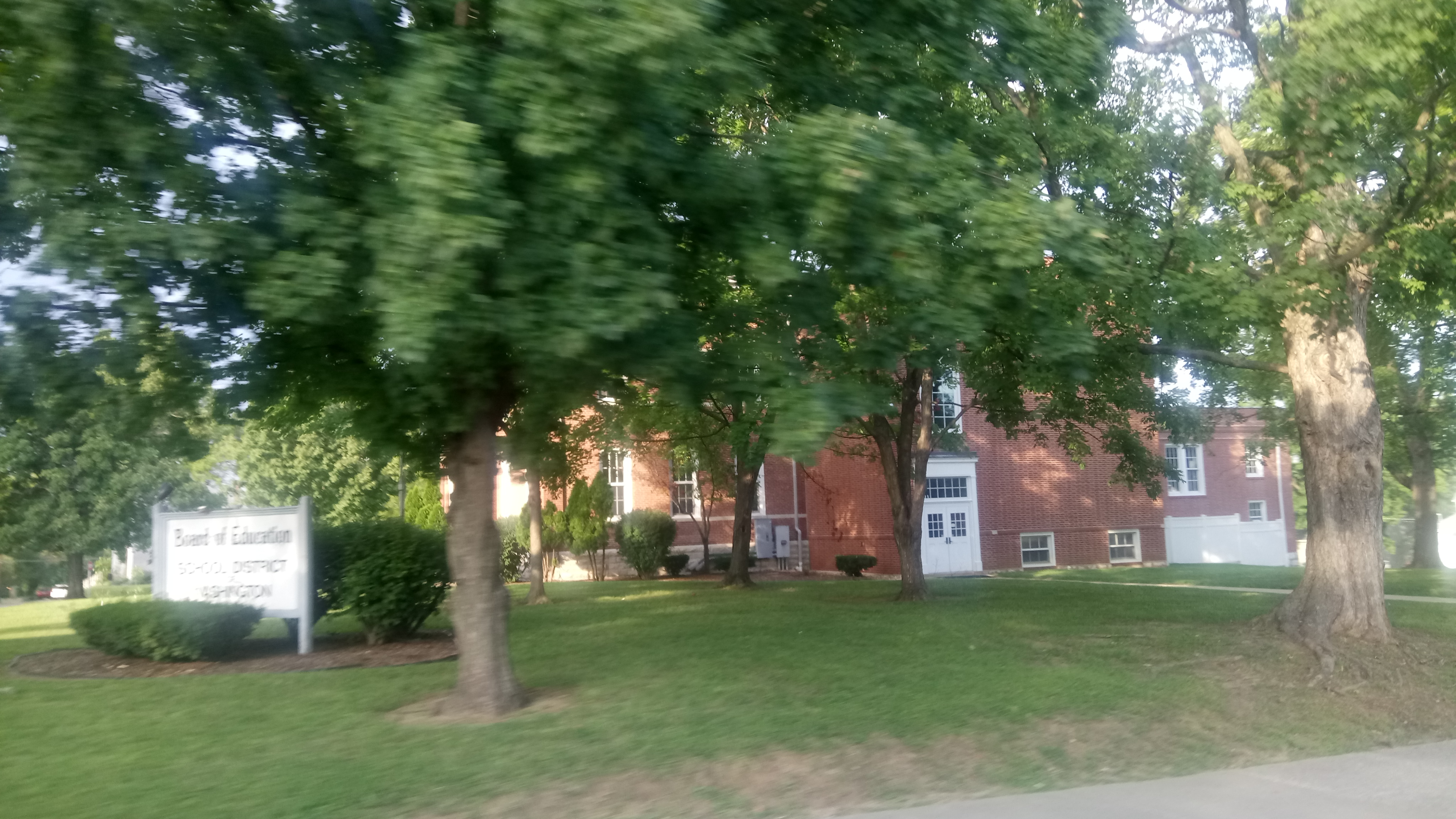
- District headquarters

Address
- 220 Locust Street Washington, Missouri, 63090; United States

District information
- Type: Public
- Grades: PreK–12
- NCES District ID: 2931110

Students and staff
- Students: 3,808
- Teachers: 310.94
- Staff: 283.58
- Student–teacher ratio: 12.25

Other information
- Website: www.washington.k12.mo.us

The School District of Washington is the public school district headquartered in Washington, Missouri.

The district includes portions of Franklin County. In that county, in addition to Washington, the district includes small pieces of Gray Summit and Villa Ridge.

The district extends into St. Charles County where it includes Augusta and a portion of the Defiance census-designated place.

The district also extends into Warren County, where it includes Marthasville and Three Creeks.

== Schools ==
Secondary schools:

- Washington High School
- Washington Middle School

Elementary schools:

- Augusta Elementary School
- Campbellton Elementary School
- Clearview Elementary School
- Labadie Elementary School
- Marthasville Elementary School
- South Point Elementary School
- Washington West Elementary School

Preschool:

- Early Learning Center

Alternative:

- Four Rivers Career Center
