= Daniel Boone Hays House =

Historic house in Missouri, United States

- U.S. National Register of Historic Places
- Location within Missouri Location within the United States
- Location: SW of Defiance off Hwy. F, near Defiance, Missouri
- Coordinates: 38°37′18″N 90°49′19″W
- Area: 9.9 acres (4.0 ha)
- Built: c. 1826-1836
- NRHP reference No.: 73002176
- Added to NRHP: April 23, 1973

Daniel Boone Hays House, also known as Hays Farm, is a historic home near Defiance, St. Charles County, Missouri. It was built between about 1826 and 1836, and is a two-story, "L"-plan, stone dwelling. The house measures approximately 42 feet wide and 52 feet deep. It was built by Daniel Boone Hays (1789-1866), an early settler and grandson of the famous pioneer Daniel Boone.

It was added to the National Register of Historic Places in 1973. Hays was the Grandson of Daniel Boone, by Daniel Boone's daughter and most of land holders were Boone family in this valley. The original home was destroyed by a tornado or fire, what's here is some unknown replica and it is not what was originally built as noted. Photographs taken before 2008 or 2010 can clearly demonstrate where the original buildings stood and how they looked. The area was affected by a tornado again in 2022.
