= Pinckney, Missouri =

Unincorporated community in the US state of Missouri

Coordinates: 38°40′43″N 91°13′59″W

Pinckney is an unincorporated community in Warren County, in the U.S. state of Missouri.

== History ==
Pinckney was platted in 1819, and named after Atossa Pinckney Sharp, the daughter of a county official. A post office called Pinckney was established in 1833, and remained in operation until 1905. A variant name was "Kruegerville".
