= Warrenton Nursing Home fire =

1957 fire in Warrenton, Missouri

Coordinates: 38.8122693°N 91.1407042°W

- Date: February 17, 1957
- Time: 2:40 p.m.
- Location: Warrenton, Missouri, United States
- Type: Fire
- Deaths: 72

The Warrenton Nursing Home fire took place at the Katie Jane Memorial Home for the Aged in Warrenton, Missouri, on February 17, 1957, and killed 72 people. The 2 1/2-story facility, located sixty miles west of St. Louis, housed 155 elderly people and had been converted just two years earlier, after having previously served as the site of Central Wesleyan College.

== Fire ==
The blaze began at approximately 2:40 p.m. reportedly in a first floor annex linen closet during a Sunday afternoon religious service. On the first floor of the main building, Lutheran minister Walter Schwane was leading a hymn, "What a Friend We Have in Jesus," when a scream was heard from one of the visitors who had noticed smoke near the room of her uncles. Concerned, she soon saw intense flames near the closet and screamed "Fire!" as she raced throughout the facility.

Of the 194 residents of the home, about 149 were in the main building which had three sections and was two and a half stories tall. Within 30 minutes, the annex building became an inferno with local residents offering help in attempting to rescue residents. Nurses and attendants evacuated patients that they could with mattresses, and wheel chairs being used, but a large number of patients were trapped on the second floor and ladders were used to attempt to evacuate the upper floors. Eventually, the building's roof caved in, with flames shooting high into the air and smoke visible from 30 miles (48 km) away.

== Victims ==
Seventy-two people died in the fire with many of the victims either locked in their rooms or strapped to their beds, causing many to be unable to evacuate from the quickly moving fire. The roof also collapsed causing the first floor to collapse into the basement, delaying the recovery and identification of all victims. Seventy-one reportedly died due to the fire and one later died at the hospital two days later, with forty-six men and twenty-six women among the deceased.

== Investigation ==
In the aftermath of the tragedy, it was determined that a number of factors served as potential causes, including wood in the building that was more than 50 years old, coupled with thermostats often kept at 85–90 °F (29–32 °C) to keep residents comfortable during the frigid winter months.

The facility had been inspected just one week earlier by a state official. However, in the immediate aftermath of the tragedy, arson was suggested by one Missouri State Police officer when it was disclosed that the sister of the Home's manager had run a similar facility in Hillsboro, Missouri in which 18 people died in a 1952 fire.

During the subsequent investigation, the notion of arson was dismissed as the final determination was that the blaze started from an undetermined cause. Despite this finding, the facility had been operating without a license, had inadequate fire escapes, and lacked a sprinkler system. In addition, there was no alarm system nor evacuation plan, while some residents were locked in their rooms, being a common practice of that period. The end result of those omissions came when Missouri Governor James T. Blair signed a bill in March 1957 that established minimum safety standards for nursing homes in the state.
