= Concord Hill, Missouri =

Unincorporated community in Missouri, U.S.

Coordinates: 38°39′01″N 91°08′11″W

Concord Hill is an unincorporated community in Warren County, in the U.S. state of Missouri.

== History ==
A variant name was "Eckelkamp". A post office called Eckelkamp was established in 1891, and remained in operation until 1893. According to tradition, the community was named for the local harvest of Concord grapes. The community had Concord Hill Schoolhouse, now defunct.
