= Bill Beeny =

American minister (1926–2022)

- Born: July 1, 1926; Madisonville, Kentucky, U.S.
- Died: January 19, 2022 (aged 95); Wright City, Missouri, U.S.

Bill Beeny (July 1, 1926 – January 19, 2022) was a Baptist minister and self-declared segregationist who led organizations in St. Louis, Missouri, during the 1960s. More recently he had worked to popularize his theory that the American singer Elvis Presley was still living.

== Early years ==
Beeny, whose father died when he was nine years old, was one of five children. During his late teens and early twenties, he worked as a tavern porter and manager in Eldorado, Illinois, the hometown of the woman he married at age eighteen. Beeny battled recurrent tuberculosis as a young man; during one painful recuperation, as he later explained, he "got disgusted with my life and was converted to the Christian faith." He was ordained by the Southern Baptist Convention in 1947, and during the 1950s he attended Shurtleff College in Alton, Illinois and the American Divinity School in Chicago, Illinois.

== Political and ministerial career ==
Over the course of the 1950s and 1960s, Beeny based himself in St. Louis, where he was active in domestic anti-communist campaigns and led local and national efforts directed against civil-rights and student-movement leaders. In 1961, Beeny picketed Washington University in St. Louis, urging the U.S. House Committee on Un-American Activities to investigate his allegations of communist "infiltration" among university faculty – especially those who had signed a nuclear-test-ban petition organized by California chemist and Nobel laureate Linus Pauling. He also participated in national petition drives urging the Committee to investigate the Southern Christian Leadership Conference and the Black Panthers.

Beeny's political and religious radio broadcasts, which began with one station in Alton, Illinois, were eventually heard on dozens of stations across the country. At the same time, the minister operated an "anti-communist" youth ranch in Wright City, Missouri; the ranch, according to Beeny's claim, drew upwards of 1,500 campers per summer during the early 1960s. Beeny faced constant legal problems over questionable financial practices at his Missouri Youth Ranch and his Denver-area radio station "The Voice of Reason." In 1960, accusations of marital infidelity forced Beeny from his position as pastor of the New Testament Baptist Church, which he had founded in a St. Louis storefront five years earlier. Lawsuits over an allegedly fraudulent bond issue to finance his ranch and broadcasting operations soon followed. After his resignation, Beeny took up the pastorship of the St. Louis Baptist Temple, a position he would hold until 1969.

Beeny organized Missouri rallies in support of the Vietnam War through the 1960s. In 1966, the minister formed the Counter-Revolutionary Organization on Salvation and Service (CROSS), with chapters in Miami, Florida and St. Louis. Working out of Beeny's Baptist church at 4249 Gibson Avenue, CROSS's St. Louis chapter organized several controversial "home-defense" seminars. The meetings were intended to instruct members in fire-arms and survivalist tactics in order to fend off what Beeny called "those so-called civil-rights groups now reported to be stocking weapons" in preparation for a revolutionary uprising.

Running for Missouri Lieutenant-Governor as a Democrat in 1968 – one of his many unsuccessful bids for state and local office – Beeny endorsed the presidential campaign of the then-segregationist Alabama Governor George C. Wallace. Beeny's own campaign platform, as outlined in his newsletter The Herald of Missouri, urged "states' rights," opposed open-housing legislation and busing for school integration, and advocated a "tough-on-crime" policy that would include ordering police to "shoot to kill" in response to civil disorders.

Beeny also recorded gospel music and played it with a father/daughter duo, Ora and Gwen Gaulden of St. Louis, Missouri.

== Elvis Presley-related work ==
The minister relocated to Wright City, Missouri, in 1969 after a fire at his St. Louis church. There, he operated a general store and more recently sought to popularize his theory that the American singer Elvis Presley, who died in 1977, was still living. Beeny was owner of The 50s Cafe, which was packed with 1950s memorabilia focusing mainly on Presley and Marilyn Monroe. Beeny also founded the Elvis is Alive Museum in his Wright City store space in 1992, and, in 2005, he published his book Elvis' DNA Proves He's Alive. Beeny maintained a website dedicated to Presley and to his own museum. Beeny also resumed broadcasts of pre-recorded religious, political and Elvis Presley-related content, this time via the internet.

In October 2007, Bill Beeny placed the entire contents of his museum and his two websites on sale on eBay, as one lot. The sale attracted attention from national news outlets such as The New York Times and National Public Radio. The sale ended November 8, with a winning bid of $8,300 placed by Andy Key of Hattiesburg, Mississippi. Key reopened the museum in Hattiesburg, but in September 2008 Key was called up for National Guard duty and, unable to continue running the museum, he attempted to sell the collection on eBay. Failing to find a buyer, Key put it into storage. Meanwhile, according to the St. Louis Post-Dispatch, Beeny turned the museum's former home into a mission center and food bank helping poor and hungry people. In April 2009, the St. Louis Post-Dispatch reported that Beeny's mission center had been burgled, with the perpetrator stealing the computer used to run Beeny's streaming online Christian radio station.
