= Wolf-Ruebeling House =

Historic house in Missouri, United States

- Formerly listed on the U.S. National Register of Historic Places
- Location within Missouri Location within the United States
- Location: MO 94, near Defiance, Missouri
- Coordinates: 38°40′8″N 90°43′53″W
- Area: less than one acre
- Built: 1857-1859
- Architectural style: Classical Revival
- NRHP reference No.: 83001038

Significant dates
- Added to NRHP: March 29, 1983
- Removed from NRHP: December 19, 1994

Wolf-Ruebeling House was a historic home near Defiance, St. Charles County, Missouri. It was built between about 1857 and 1859, and was a two-story, vernacular style brick I-house with Classical Revival style design references. It was destroyed in a 1985 fire.

It was added to the National Register of Historic Places in 1983 and delisted in 1994.
