= Marthasville Hardware Building =

- U.S. National Register of Historic Places
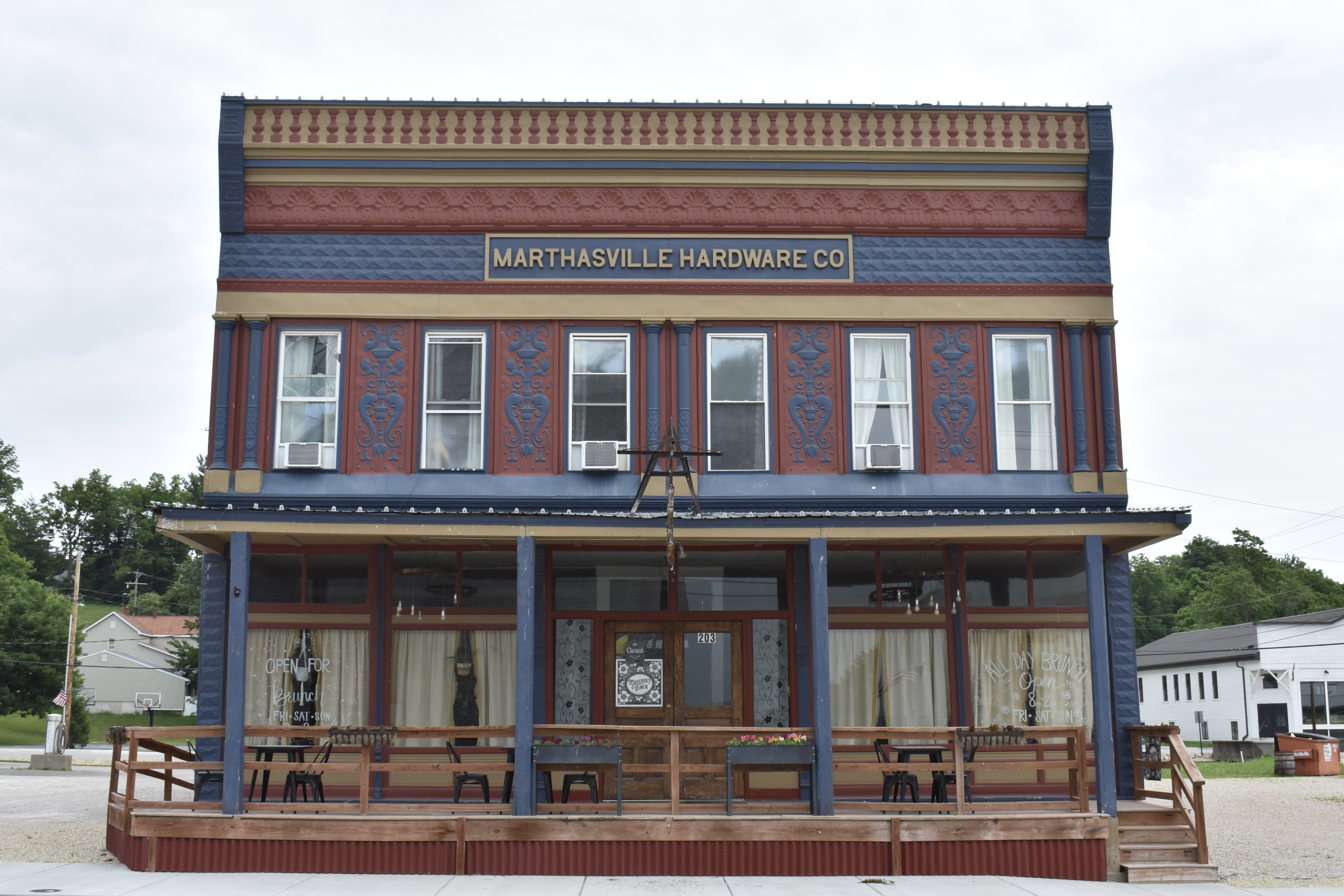

- Location within Missouri Location within the United States
- Location: 203 Depot St. Marthasville, Missouri
- Coordinates: 38°37′47″N 91°3′42″W
- Area: less than one acre
- Built: 1902
- Architectural style: Early Commercial, Two-part commercial block
- NRHP reference No.: 08000020
- Added to NRHP: February 14, 2008

Marthasville Hardware Building is a historic commercial building located at Marthasville, Warren County, Missouri. It was built in 1902, and is a two-story, frame building on a rubble stone foundation. It features stamped steel ornamentation on the front facade.

It was listed on the National Register of Historic Places in 2008.
