= Isaac McCormick House =

Historic house in Missouri, United States

- U.S. National Register of Historic Places
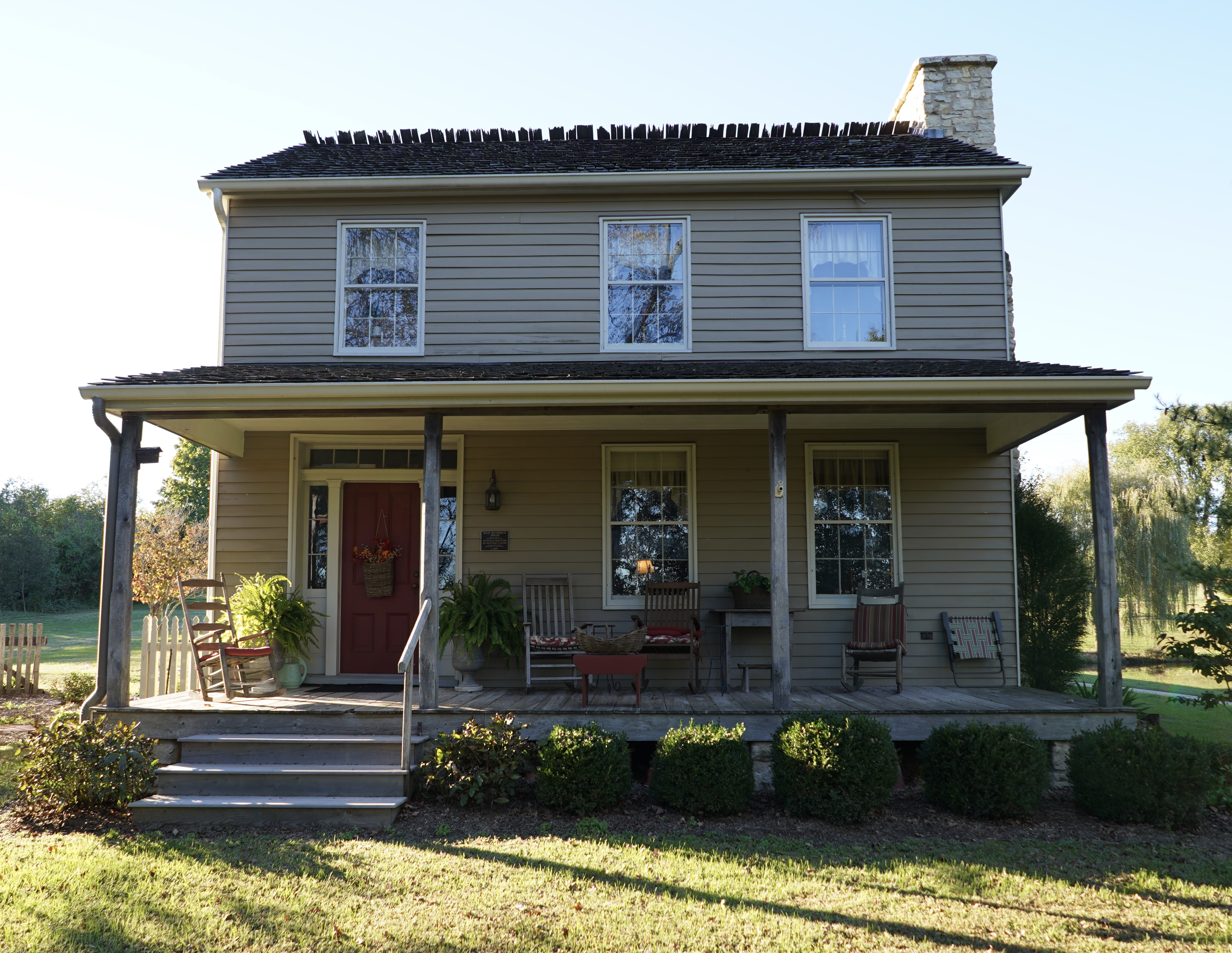

- Location within Missouri Location within the United States
- Location: SW of Defiance off Hwy. F, near Defiance, Missouri
- Coordinates: 38°38′28″N 90°48′18″W
- Area: less than one acre
- Built: c. 1867
- Built by: McCormick, Isaac
- Architectural style: Hewn-log house
- NRHP reference No.: 04000960
- Added to NRHP: September 10, 2004

Isaac McCormick House, also known as McCormick Farm, is a historic home located near Defiance, St. Charles County, Missouri. It was built around 1867, and is a two-story, "L"-plan, log dwelling. It consists of a single pen hewn log main section with single pen hewn log ell. The main section measures approximately 18 feet wide and 27 feet deep and has a side gable roof.

It was added to the National Register of Historic Places in 2004.
