= Borgmann Mill =

- Formerly listed on the U.S. National Register of Historic Places
- Location within Missouri Location within the United States
- Location: 5 miles east of Marthasville on County Road D, near Marthasville, Missouri
- Coordinates: 38°38′43″N 90°59′49″W
- Area: 9.9 acres (4.0 ha)
- Built: 1847-1850
- Built by: Borgmann, Frederich W.
- NRHP reference No.: 70000351

Significant dates
- Added to NRHP: November 10, 1970
- Removed from NRHP: December 19, 1994

Borgmann Mill was a historic grist mill located near Marthasville, Warren County, Missouri. It was built between 1847 and 1850, and was a 1 1/2-story, timber frame building. The mill was powered by mule teams or oxen. At its listing it was the only "barley huller and corn grinder" constructed entirely of wood left in Missouri or the Middle West.

It was listed on the National Register of Historic Places in 1970 and delisted in 1994.
