= Southwestern Bell Repeater Station-Wright City =

- U.S. National Register of Historic Places
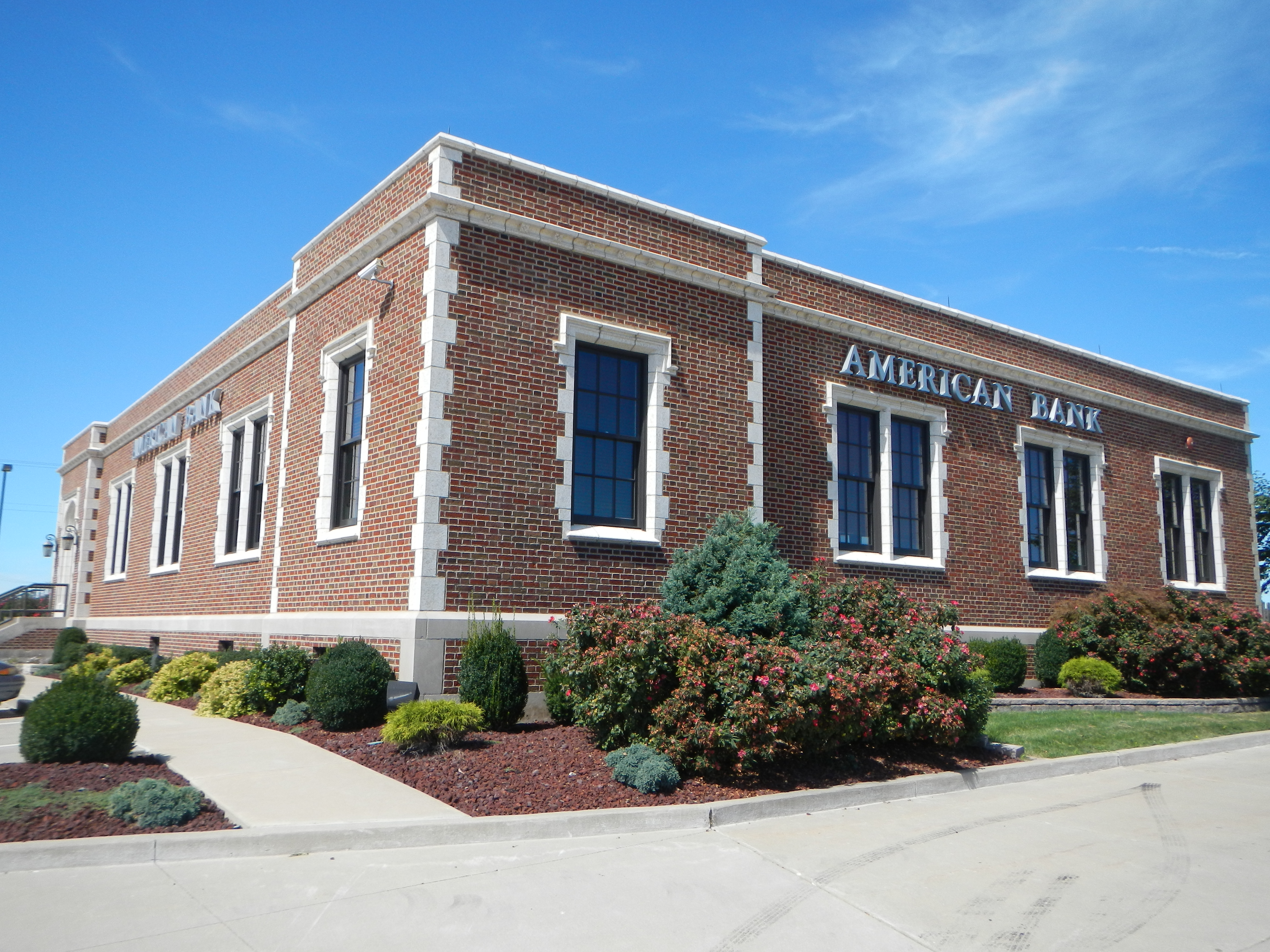
- Southwestern Bell Repeater Station-Wright City, September 2013

- Location within Missouri Location within the United States
- Location: NE corner of North Service Rd. and Bell Rd., Wright City, Missouri
- Coordinates: 38°49′50″N 91°2′40″W
- Area: 1 acre (0.40 ha)
- Built: 1930
- Built by: Knight, W.J. & Co., et al.
- Architect: Timlin, Irving R.
- Architectural style: Tudor Revival
- NRHP reference No.: 07000039
- Added to NRHP: February 13, 2007

Southwestern Bell Repeater Station-Wright City, also known as the AT&T Repeater Station and Reliance Automotive, is a historic telephone repeater station located at Wright City, Warren County, Missouri. It was built in 1930 by Southwestern Bell, and is a one-story, Tudor Revival style variegated brick building. It features decorative quoins and entrance and window surrounds accented by terra cotta.

It was listed on the National Register of Historic Places in 2007.
