= Bernheimer, Missouri =

Unincorporated community in Missouri, U.S.

Coordinates: 38°40′05″N 91°15′18″W

Bernheimer is an unincorporated community in Warren County, in the U.S. state of Missouri.

== History ==
A post office called Bernheimer was established in 1893, closed temporarily in 1895, reopened in 1897, and was discontinued in 1945. The community has the name of Joseph Bernheimer, a St. Louis capitalist.

The Katy Trail, a 225-mile long bike path, passes through Bernheimer.
