= KWRE =

Radio station in Warrenton, Missouri

- Warrenton, Missouri; United States
- Broadcast area: East Central Missouri
- Frequency: 730 kHz
- Branding: Traditional Country

Programming
- Format: Country Music
- Affiliations: Fox News Radio

Ownership
- Owner: Kaspar Broadcasting Co. of Missouri
- Sister stations: KFAV

History
- First air date: March 9, 1949
- Call sign meaning: Warrenton

Technical information
- Licensing authority: FCC
- Facility ID: 33467
- Class: D
- Power: 1,000 watts day 120 watts night
- Transmitter coordinates: 38°49′20.00″N 91°8′15.00″W
- Repeater: 95.1 K236CK (Warrenton)

Links
- Public license information: Public file; LMS
- Website: www.kwre.com

KWRE (730 AM) is a commercial radio station that is licensed to Warrenton, Missouri. The station serves mainly the western portion of the Greater St. Louis metropolitan area including Warren, St. Charles, Lincoln, Franklin, and parts of St. Louis counties. The station also serves the eastern portion of Mid-Missouri. KWRE also broadcasts on 95.1 on the FM dial via translator K236CK. The radio station is the sister station of KFAV. Both KFAV and KWRE play country music. KWRE is required to reduce power to 120 watts at night to protect other stations on the same channel. It uses a non-directional antenna at all times.
