= Flanders Callaway House =

Historic house in Missouri, United States

- U.S. National Register of Historic Places
- Location within Missouri Location within the United States
- Location: 1 mile south of Marthasville off Route 94, near Marthasville, Missouri
- Coordinates: 38°37′3″N 91°3′1″W
- Area: less than one acre
- Built: 1812
- Architectural style: Federal, Log house
- NRHP reference No.: 69000127
- Added to NRHP: July 29, 1969

Flanders Callaway House was a historic home formerly located near Marthasville, Warren County, Missouri. It was built about 1812, and was a two-story, five-bay, walnut hewn-log frontier house. The house was typical of early Federal style log constructions found in Kentucky and Tennessee. Its builder Flanders Callaway was a son-in-law of famed frontiersman Daniel Boone, husband of his second eldest daughter Jemima. Daniel Boone's funeral in 1820 was held in the barn of the Flanders Callaway homestead. The house was completely dismantled in 1968 and sold in 1979 and moved to St. Charles County for reassembly.

It was listed on the National Register of Historic Places in 1969 and delisted in 1994.

== See also ==
- Capture and rescue of Jemima Boone
- James Callaway
