= Lippstadt Community, Missouri =

Unincorporated community in Missouri, U.S.

Coordinates: 38°45′29″N 91°08′39″W

Lippstadt Community is an unincorporated community in Warren County, in the U.S. state of Missouri.

== History ==
Variant names are "Lippestadt" and "Lippstadt". The community was named after Lippe, Germany, the native home of a large share of the first settlers.
