= Gore, Missouri =

Unincorporated community in Missouri, U.S.

Coordinates: 38°42′52″N 91°19′21″W

Gore is an unincorporated community in southwest Warren County, in the U.S. state of Missouri. The community lies on the north edge of the Missouri River Valley. Missouri Route 94 passes just north of the community and the Katy Trail passes the location. The Loutre Slough joins the Missouri River just south of the community.

== History ==
A post office called Gore was established in 1894, and remained in operation until 1953. It is uncertain why the name "Gore" was applied to this community.
