= Herman H. Fortmann Building =

- U.S. National Register of Historic Places
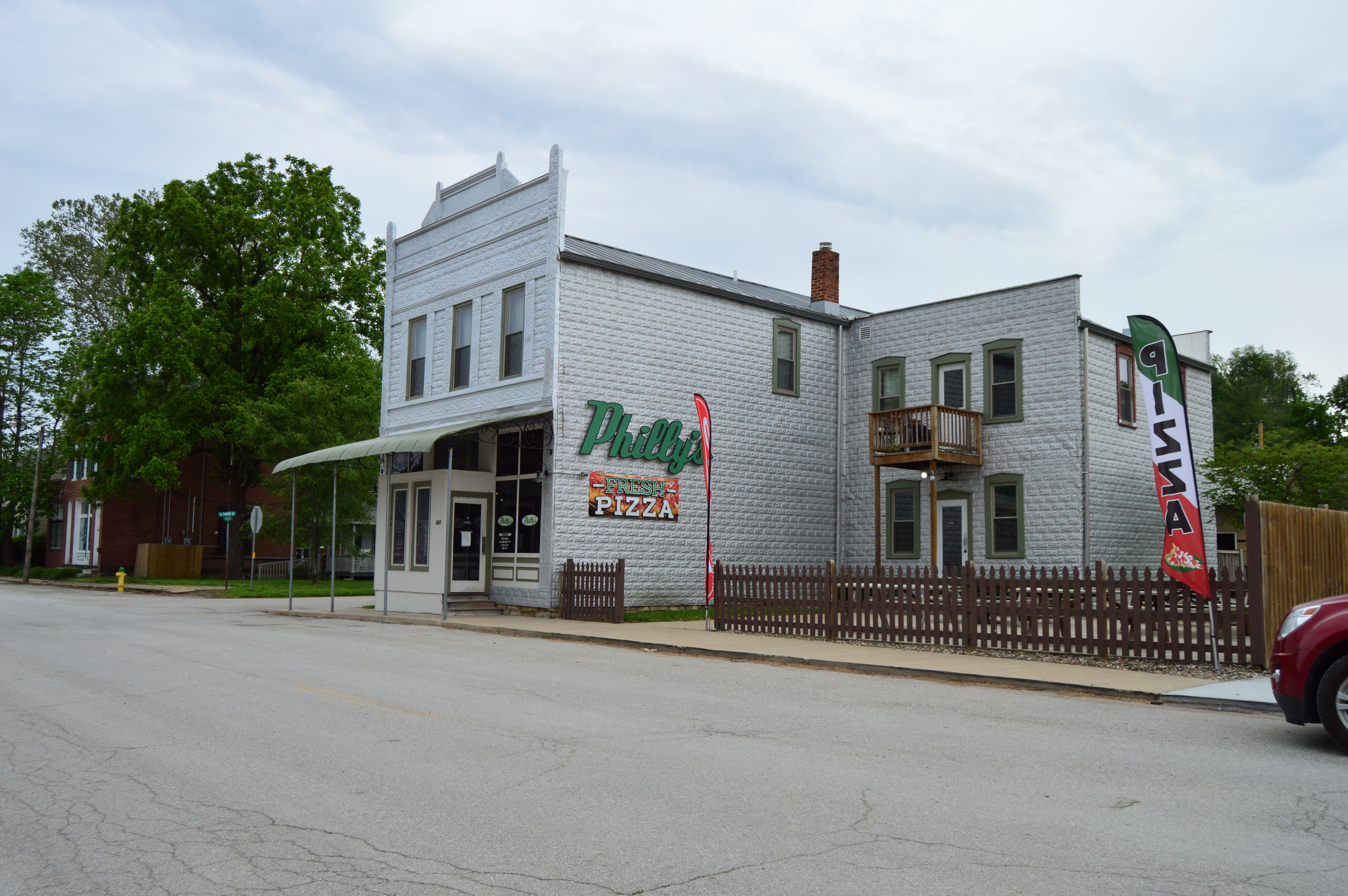
- The building in 2020

- Location within Missouri Location within the United States
- Location: 207 Depot St. Marthasville, Missouri
- Coordinates: 38°37′48″N 91°3′44″W
- Area: less than one acre
- Built: 1904
- Built by: Callaway, Teach; Mittler, John
- Architectural style: Late Victorian
- NRHP reference No.: 06000332
- Added to NRHP: May 5, 2006

Herman H. Fortmann Building, also known as the Dickmann Store, is a historic commercial building located at Marthasville, Warren County, Missouri, United States. It was built in 1904, and is a two-story, Late Victorian style frame building on a stone foundation. It features an elaborate pressed metal facade and parapet.

It was listed on the National Register of Historic Places in 2006.
