= Starke–Meinershagen–Boeke Rural Historic District =

Historic district in Missouri, United States

- U.S. National Register of Historic Places
- U.S. Historic district
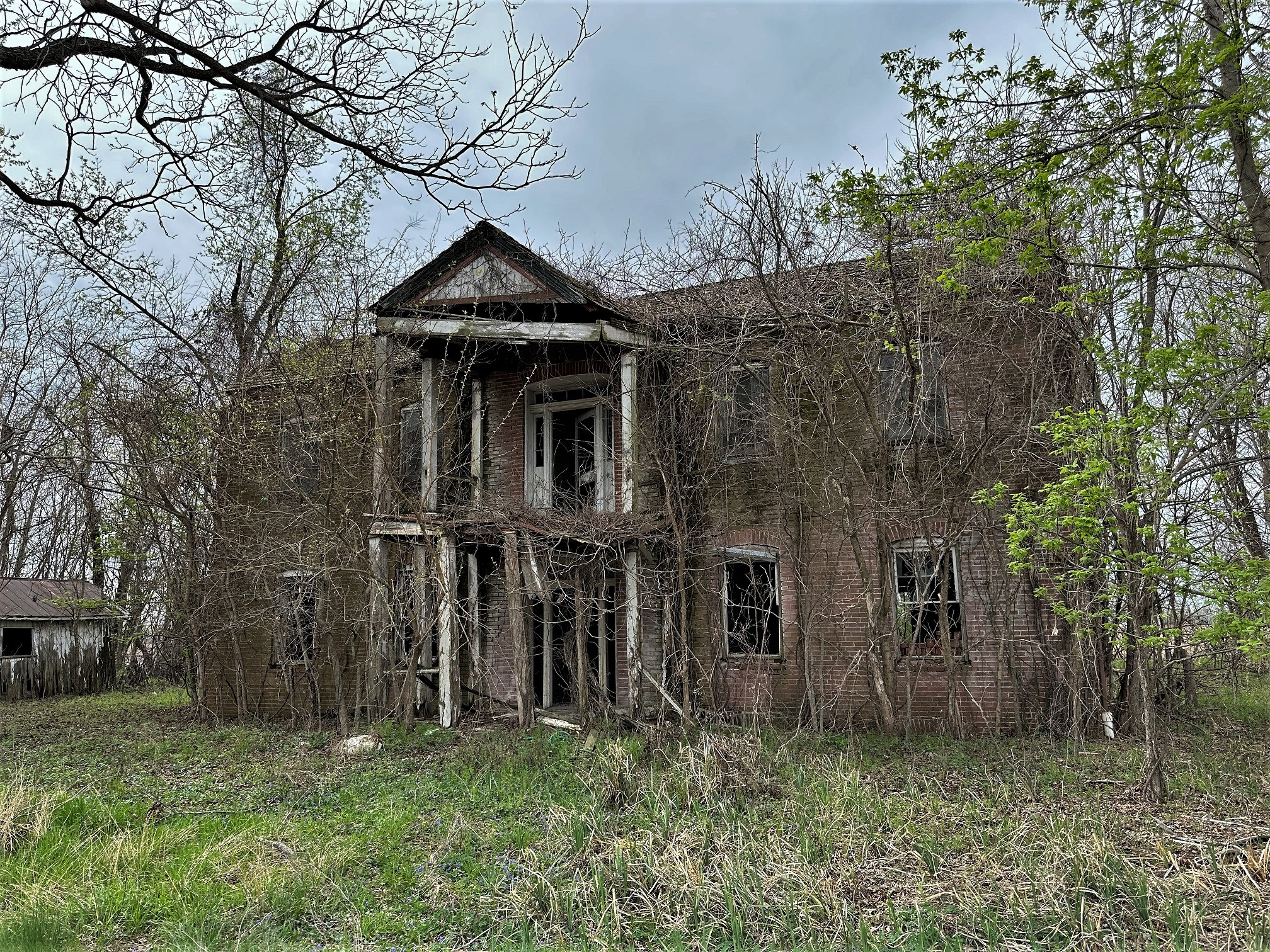

- Location within Missouri Location within the United States
- Location: Route 94, 5 miles west of Marthasville, near Marthasville, Missouri
- Coordinates: 38°37′36″N 91°4′47″W
- Area: 5 acres (2.0 ha)
- Built: c. 1863-1870
- Architectural style: Missouri-German
- NRHP reference No.: 97001611
- Added to NRHP: January 7, 1998

Starke–Meinershagen–Boeke Rural Historic District is a historic national historic district located near Marthasville, Warren County, Missouri. The district encompasses seven contributing buildings on an 1860s farmstead. The contributing buildings are a two-story, brick I-house and brick smokehouse dated between 1863 and 1870; and a gambrel roof barn, two machine sheds, a garage, and a hen house dated to the early-20th century.

It was listed on the National Register of Historic Places in 1998.
