= Pin Oak Community, Missouri =

Unincorporated community in Missouri, U.S.

Coordinates: 38°56′54″N 91°15′17″W

Pin Oak Community is an unincorporated community in Warren County, in the U.S. state of Missouri.

== History ==
A post office called Pin Oak was established in 1854, and remained in operation until 1876. The community was named for a grove of pin oak trees near the original town site.
