= Wright City R-II School District =

School district in Missouri, U.S.

Location
- 90 Bell Road; Wright City, Missouri

District information
- Type: Public school district
- Motto: Dedicated to our students' success
- Grades: K–12
- Established: 1922
- Superintendent: Dr. Christopher Berger
- Schools: 5
- Budget: $18.9 million (2014-15)
- NCES District ID: 2932310

Students and staff
- Students: 1,597
- Student–teacher ratio: 15:1

Other information
- Source: Missouri Department of Elementary & Secondary Education
- Website: www.wrightcity.k12.mo.us

Wright City R-II School District is a school district headquartered in Wright City, Missouri. It serves all of Wright City and parts of Foristell and Innsbrook in Warren County. and parts of southern Lincoln County.

== Schools ==
Wright City

- Wright City High School
- Wright City Middle School
- Wright City West Elementary School
- Wright Start Preschool

Foristell

- Wright City East Elementary School
