= Holstein, Missouri =

Unincorporated community in the US state of Missouri

Coordinates: 38°39′19″N 91°10′17″W

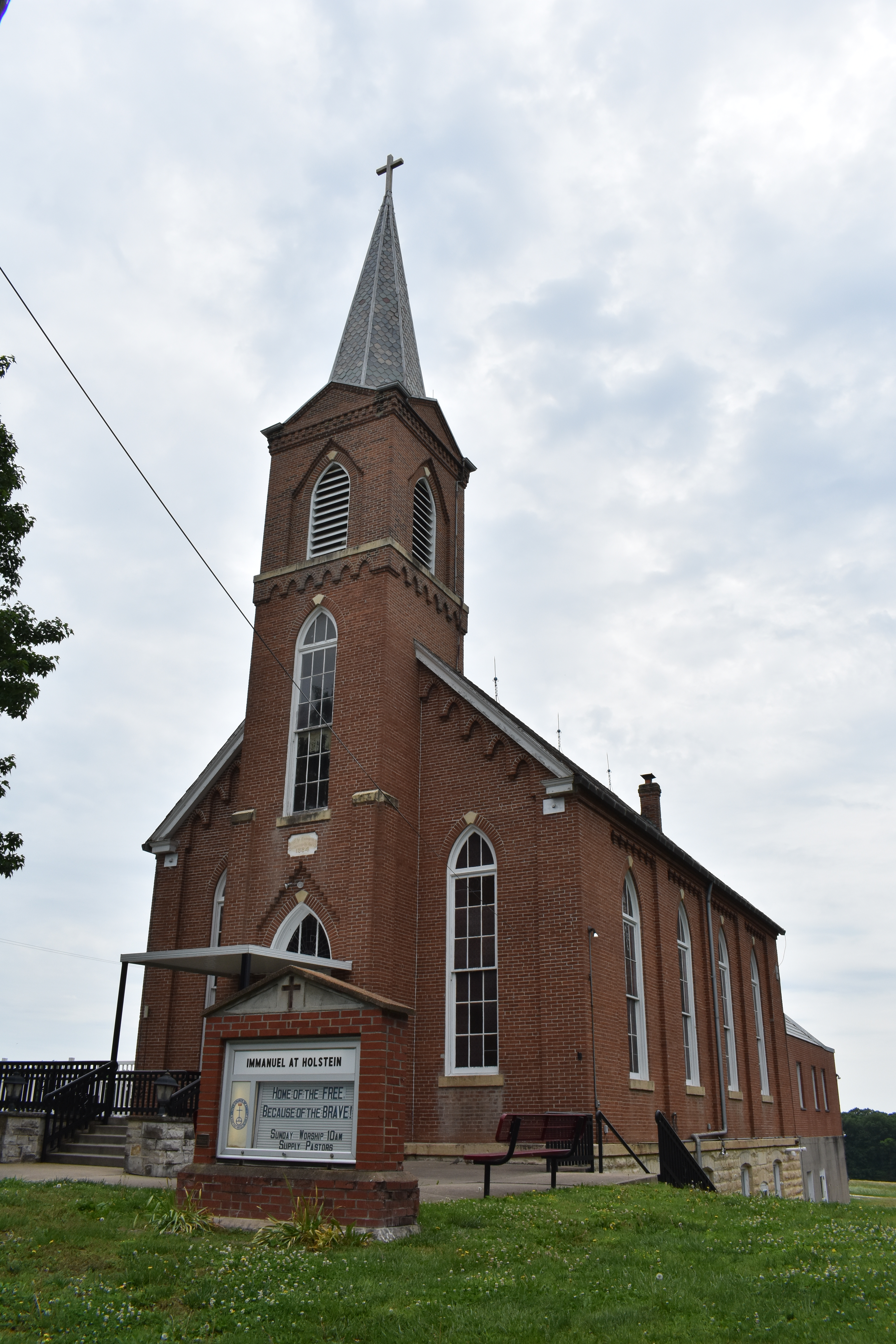
Immanuel at Holsten

Holstein is an unincorporated community in Warren County, in the U.S. state of Missouri.

== History ==
The first settlement at Holstein was made ca. 1843. A post office called Holstein was established in 1855, and remained in operation until 1953. Holstein was originally settled chiefly by Germans, and named by them after the region of Holstein, in Northern Germany.
