= Innsbrook, Missouri =

- Village
- Location of Innsbrook, Missouri
- Coordinates: 38°45′54″N 91°3′27″W
- Country: United States
- State: Missouri
- County: Warren
- founded: 1998

Area
  - Total: 11.21 sq mi (29.04 km^{2})
  - Land: 10.10 sq mi (26.17 km^{2})
  - Water: 1.11 sq mi (2.87 km^{2})
- Elevation: 669 ft (204 m)

Population (2020)
  - Total: 596
  - Density: 59.0/sq mi (22.77/km^{2})
- Time zone: UTC-6 (Central (CST))
  - Summer (DST): UTC-5 (CDT)
- ZIP Code: 63390
- Area code: 636
- FIPS code: 29-35240
- GNIS feature ID: 1802737
- Website: www.villageofinnsbrook.org

Innsbrook is a village in Warren County, Missouri, United States. As of the 2020 census, Innsbrook had a population of 596. The village of Innsbrook is comprised almost entirely by Innsbrook Resort—a private, gated community. The village was founded in 1998.

The name “Innsbrook” was given to the village as a nod to Innsbruck, capital of Austria’s Tyrol region, a place where beautiful A-frames can be found clustered around small lakes much like Innsbrook.

Construction began on a 236-acre Alpine Lake in 2000. Innsbrook's largest lake so far. ^{(2)}

== Geography ==
Innsbrook is located at 38°45′54″N 91°3′27″W (38.764966, −91.057398).

According to the United States Census Bureau, the village has a total area of 11.05 square miles (28.62 km^{2}), of which 9.94 square miles (25.74 km^{2}) is land and 1.11 square miles (2.87 km^{2}) is water.

== Demographics ==
Historical population
Census	Pop.	Note	%±
2000	469		—
2010	552		17.7%
2020	596		8.0%
U.S. Decennial Census

=== 2010 census ===
As of the census of 2010, there were 552 people, 282 households, and 209 families living in the village. The population density was 55.5 inhabitants per square mile (21.4/km^{2}). There were 1,315 housing units at an average density of 132.3 per square mile (51.1/km^{2}). The racial makeup of the village was 97.6% White, 1.4% African American, 0.2% from other races, and 0.7% from two or more races. Hispanic or Latino of any race were 0.5% of the population.

There were 282 households, of which 8.2% had children under the age of 18 living with them, 72.3% were married couples living together, 1.1% had a female householder with no husband present, 0.7% had a male householder with no wife present, and 25.9% were non-families. 22.3% of all households were made up of individuals, and 14.5% had someone living alone who was 65 years of age or older. The average household size was 1.96 and the average family size was 2.23.

The median age in the village was 64.5 years. 6.3% of residents were under the age of 18; 1.2% were between the ages of 18 and 24; 6.1% were from 25 to 44; 38.6% were from 45 to 64; and 47.8% were 65 years of age or older. The gender makeup of the village was 47.3% male and 52.7% female.

=== 2000 census ===
As of the census of 2000, there were 469 people, 222 households, and 172 families living in the village. The population density was 52.3 inhabitants per square mile (20.2/km^{2}). There were 1,077 housing units at an average density of 120.0 per square mile (46.3/km^{2}). The racial makeup of the village was 99.57% White and 0.43% African American. Hispanic or Latino of any race were 0.43% of the population.

There were 222 households, out of which 9.0% had children under the age of 18 living with them, 75.2% were married couples living together, 0.5% had a female householder with no husband present, and 22.1% were non-families. 16.2% of all households were made up of individuals, and 5.9% had someone living alone who was 65 years of age or older. The average household size was 2.11 and the average family size was 2.31.

In the village, the population was spread out, with 9.0% under the age of 18, 2.6% from 18 to 24, 11.1% from 25 to 44, 49.0% from 45 to 64, and 28.4% who were 65 years of age or older. The median age was 58 years. For every 100 females, there were 98.7 males. For every 100 females age 18 and over, there were 95.0 males.

The median income for a household in the village was $65,833, and the median income for a family was $70,156. Males had a median income of $51,875 versus $35,000 for females. The per capita income for the village was $40,434. About 0.6% of families and 1.6% of the population were below the poverty line, including none of those under age 18 and 3.0% of those age 65 or over.

== Education ==
Most of Innsbrook is in the Wright City R-II School District of Warren County. A portion of Innsbrook to the west is in the Warren County R-III School District.
