= Wright City High School =

American high school in Missouri

Location
- 159 Roelker Road; Wright City, Missouri 63390; United States; 38.8356°N 91.0365°W

Information
- Type: Public
- Established: 1922; 104 years ago
- School district: Wright City R-II School District
- Principal: Matt Brooks
- Teaching staff: 34.11 (on FTE basis)
- Grades: 9–12
- Gender: Co-ed
- Enrollment: 543 (2023–24)
- Student to teacher ratio: 15.92
- Colors: Blue and gold
- Athletics conference: Eastern Missouri Conference
- Nickname: Wildcats
- Website: wchs.wrightcity.k12.mo.us

Wright City High School (WCHS) is a public high school in Wright City, Missouri, part of the Wright City R-II School District. It was established in 1922.

== History ==
=== Early years ===
In 1922, O.P. Browning, superintendent of the Wright City grade school, along with patrons of the school and the Missouri Board of Education, decided to establish a third-class high school in Wright City to teach ninth and tenth grade. William Heidtman was given the position of president, and J.H. Stegen became the school's secretary. In September 1922, the school opened to the public, but as there wasn't a building available to use, part of the city hall was adapted for use as a classroom, with no rental fee being charged. The first year, there were only five students: Forest Strathman, Richard Koopman, Wayne Stoff, Gladys Nieburg, and Arline Astroth.

The school's first term was seen as such a success that a decision was reached by the Board of Education to submit a proposition to vote bonds for an additional two rooms at the grade school building in 1923. However, the bonds failed to obtain the two-thirds majority vote during a local election. A special election was called in April, and the bond issue for $3,500 passed by a large majority. A contract was let, and construction began. The school was approved as a second class educational institution, but there was a temporary lapse to third class in 1925. In 1926, the school was once again approved as a second class institution.

=== Modern years ===
In June 2019, Wright City High School received its first-ever fire alarm system in the building's 52-year history. Previously, the only way to alert students and faculty of a fire would have been to have somebody alert everyone over the school's intercom system. Superintendent David Buck also said that the district was reviewing its evacuation plans for fires. In 2025, Wright City built a brand new high school on Roelker Rd, with a brand new school, brand new baseball field, and a brand new football field. This school is over 122,000 square feet with a big parking lot.
