= KFAV =

Radio station in Warrenton–St. Louis, Missouri

- Warrenton, Missouri; United States
- Broadcast area: St. Louis Metropolitan Area
- Frequency: 99.9 MHz
- Branding: KFAV 99.9 FM

Programming
- Format: Country

Ownership
- Owner: Kaspar Broadcasting
- Sister stations: KWRE

History
- First air date: |1991

Technical information
- Licensing authority: FCC
- Class: C3
- ERP: 10,500 watts
- HAAT: 156 meters (512 ft)
- Transmitter coordinates: type:city 38°50′20.00″N 91°02′40.00″W

Links
- Public license information: Public file; LMS
- Website: kfavradio.com

KFAV (99.9 FM) is a commercial radio station located in Warrenton, Missouri, broadcasting to the western suburbs (the Westplex) of the Saint Louis, Missouri, area. KFAV airs a country music format, like its sister station on the AM dial, KWRE.

In 2007, and in 2014, KFAV program director Mike Thomas was recognized by New Music Weekly magazine as the Country Program Director of the Year at the New Music Awards. The Station itself was also recognized as "Country Radio Station of the Year" by the Magazine in 2014.

History of KFAV FM: In November 1991, radio station owners of Kaspar Broadcasting, Vernon John Kaspar and Steven Charles Kaspar put a new radio station on the air to service the west metro area of St. Louis...99.9 FM KFAV (All Hit V100). In September 1991, preparing to put the station on the air (went on the air in early November, 1991) a decision was made to name St. Charles, Lincoln, Warren, and Franklin Counties "The Westplex"...as the Dallas, Tx. area towards Fort Worth is called "the Metroplex
