= Marthasville, Missouri =

- City
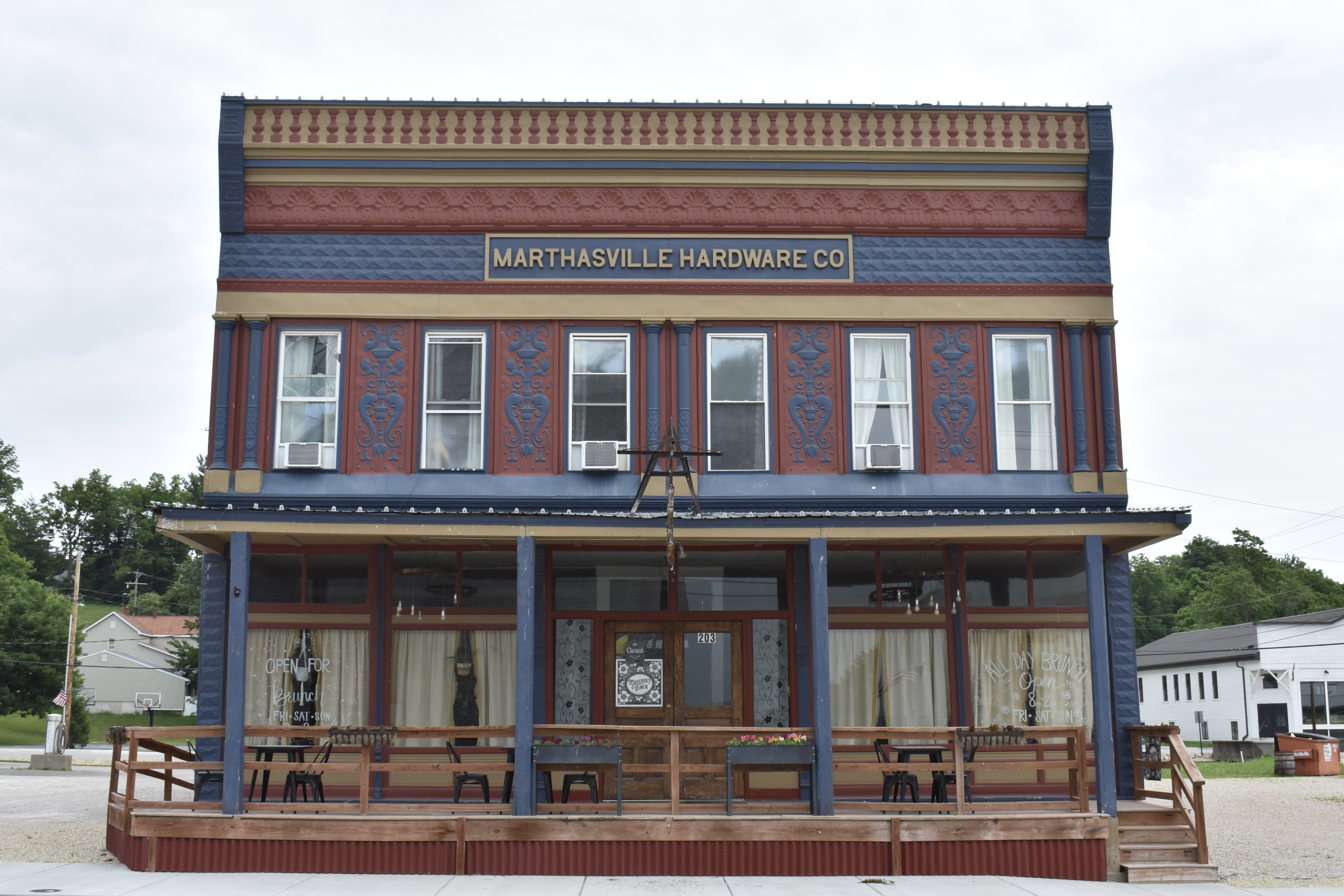

- Location of Marthasville, Missouri
- Coordinates: 38°37′50″N 91°3′32″W
- Country: United States
- State: Missouri
- County: Warren

Area
  - Total: 0.86 sq mi (2.22 km^{2})
  - Land: 0.85 sq mi (2.21 km^{2})
  - Water: 0.0039 sq mi (0.01 km^{2})
- Elevation: 561 ft (171 m)

Population (2020)
  - Total: 1,245
  - Density: 1,457.7/sq mi (562.84/km^{2})
- Time zone: UTC-6 (Central (CST))
  - Summer (DST): UTC-5 (CDT)
- ZIP code: 63357
- Area code: 636
- FIPS code: 29-46424
- GNIS feature ID: 0721912
- Website: marthasvillemo.gov

Marthasville is a city in Warren County, Missouri, United States. As of the 2020 census, Marthasville had a population of 1,245. The Katy Trail, a 240-mile long bike path, passes through Marthasville.

The original graves of Daniel Boone and his wife were located near there. In 1845, Boone's remains were disinterred and moved to Kentucky for burial. Resentment in Missouri about the disinterment grew over the years, and a legend arose that Boone's remains never left Missouri.

Because of the many wineries from here east to Defiance, Marthasville is considered to mark one end of the "Missouri Weinstrasse".

== History ==
A post office called Marthasville has been in operation since 1825. The identity of namesake "Martha" is disputed.

The Herman H. Fortmann Building, Marthasville Hardware Building, and Starke-Meinershagen-Boeke Rural Historic District are listed on the National Register of Historic Places. The Borgmann Mill and Flanders Callaway House were formerly listed.

== Geography ==
Marthasville is located at 38°37′50″N 91°3′32″W (38.630458, -91.058864). According to the United States Census Bureau, the city has a total area of 0.86 square miles (2.23 km^{2}), of which 0.85 square miles (2.20 km^{2}) is land and 0.01 square miles (0.03 km^{2}) is water.

Due to the rich soils and steep slopes, the landscape is highly suitable for viticulture, growing grapes and maintaining vineyards. Thus Marthasville became part of what is known as the Missouri "wine route".

== Demographics ==
Historical population
Census	Pop.	Note	%±
1860	76		—
1870	178		134.2%
1930	394		—
1940	321		−18.5%
1950	347		8.1%
1960	339		−2.3%
1970	415		22.4%
1980	543		30.8%
1990	674		24.1%
2000	837		24.2%
2010	1,136		35.7%
2020	1,245		9.6%
U.S. Decennial Census

=== 2010 census ===
As of the census of 2010, there were 1,136 people, 431 households, and 310 families living in the city. There were 478 housing units at an average density of 562.4 per square mile (217.1/km^{2}). The racial makeup of the city was 97.5% White, 0.2% African American, 0.3% Native American, 0.1% Asian, 0.7% from other races, and 1.2% from two or more races. Hispanic or Latino of any race were 1.8% of the population.

There were 431 households, of which 42.7% had children under the age of 18 living with them, 54.8% were married couples living together, 9.7% had a female householder with no husband present, 7.4% had a male householder with no wife present, and 28.1% were non-families. 23.9% of all households were made up of individuals, and 9.3% had someone living alone who was 65 years of age or older. The average household size was 2.64 and the average family size was 3.12.

The median age in the city was 31.1 years. 29.2% of residents were under the age of 18; 8% were between the ages of 18 and 24; 33.4% were from 25 to 44; 19.3% were from 45 to 64; and 10.1% were 65 years of age or older. The gender makeup of the city was 52.0% male and 48.0% female.

=== 2000 census ===
As of the census of 2000, there were 837 people, 321 households, and 230 families living in the city. There were 340 housing units at an average density of 406.0 per square mile (156.8/km^{2}). The racial makeup of the city was 96.77% White, 1.08% African American, 0.48% Native American, 0.36% Asian, 0.36% from other races, and 0.96% from two or more races. Hispanic or Latino of any race were 0.36% of the population.

There were 321 households, out of which 40.8% had children under the age of 18 living with them, 60.1% were married couples living together, 6.9% had a female householder with no husband present, and 28.3% were non-families. 22.4% of all households were made up of individuals, and 8.4% had someone living alone who was 65 years of age or older. The average household size was 2.61 and the average family size was 3.09.

In the city the population was spread out, with 28.8% under the age of 18, 8.2% from 18 to 24, 36.3% from 25 to 44, 17.0% from 45 to 64, and 9.7% who were 65 years of age or older. The median age was 33 years. For every 100 females there were 105.7 males. For every 100 females age 18 and over, there were 100.7 males.

The median income for a household in the city was $41,141, and the median income for a family was $45,521. Males had a median income of $32,083 versus $21,875 for females. The per capita income for the city was $17,979. About 5.9% of families and 8.5% of the population were below the poverty line, including 9.9% of those under age 18 and 9.5% of those age 65 or over.

== Education ==
It is in the School District of Washington. The comprehensive high school of the district is Washington High School.

== Notable people ==
- Jemima Boone, Daughter of Daniel Boone.
