= Warrenton, Missouri =

- City
- Downtown Warrenton
- Motto: A City For All Seasons
- Location of Warrenton, Missouri
- Coordinates: 38°48′57″N 91°8′25″W
- Country: United States
- State: Missouri
- County: Warren

Government
  - Mayor: Eric Schleuter
  - Chief of Police: Larry Ellard
  - City Clerk: Melody Rugh

Area
  - Total: 9.15 sq mi (23.71 km^{2})
  - Land: 9.05 sq mi (23.43 km^{2})
  - Water: 0.11 sq mi (0.28 km^{2})
- Elevation: 827 ft (252 m)

Population (2020)
  - Total: 8,429
  - Density: 931.7/sq mi (359.72/km^{2})
- Time zone: UTC-6 (Central (CST))
  - Summer (DST): UTC-5 (CDT)
- ZIP code: 63383
- Area code: 636
- FIPS code: 29-77128
- GNIS feature ID: 0728363
- Website: The City of Warrenton, Missouri

Warrenton is a city in and the county seat of Warren County, Missouri, United States. As of the 2020 census, Warrenton had a population of 8,429. Warrenton is an exurb of St. Louis, and is located in the St. Louis Metropolitan Statistical Area. Warrenton's slogan is "A City for All Seasons."

== History ==
Warrenton had its start in the 1830s as a planned community which was to hold the county seat. The community took its name from Warren County. The United States Postal Service Post Office in Warrenton has been in operation since 1836.

The Ernst Schowengerdt House and Warren County Courthouse and Circuit Court Building are listed on the National Register of Historic Places.

== Activities ==
Warrenton has several parks open for the enjoyment of residents. An athletic complex is home to little league soccer, baseball, softball, and tee ball. Binkley Woods Park and Spectator Lake offer walking trails, fishing accessibility, a small playground and barbecue grills. Dyer Park offers playgrounds, basketball hoops, and tennis courts, as well as an outdoor stage for concerts and other events. Khoury Park has two baseball fields, basketball hoops, and a playground. Morgan Park offers a tennis court, playground, sand volleyball area, and the Warrenton Pool.

The city has recently opened an additional park that features an indoor pool, dog-friendly trails, walking trails, and a Frisbee golf course.

The Belle Starr Theatre also holds several concerts and events each year. Warrenton High School (part of the Warren County R-3 district) offers a variety of activities open to the public, including musicals, plays, band and choir concerts, and sporting events.

== Festivals and events ==
FrühlingFest

One Saturday in June, the Warrenton Downtown Association hosts FrühlingFest, a festival that celebrates the region's German heritage. The festival includes German food, vendors of local handmade and artisan products, and other family activities.

Warrenton Fall Festival

One Saturday in September, the city closes Main Street and hosts the Fall Festival, which includes a diverse group of street vendors, food trucks, kid's activities, a car show, and main stage music entertainment. Past music acts have included the Ozark Mountain Daredevils, Little River Band, Nitty Gritty Dirt Band and regional cover band Butch Wax & The Hollywoods.

Hometown Christmas

To kick off the Christmas season, the City of Warrenton hosts Hometown Christmas, an evening that includes an official tree lighting, Christmas carols, choir performances at Friedens United Church of Christ, hot chocolate, cookies, a visit by Santa, as well as a decoration event held at the Warren County Historical Society & Museum.

== Geography ==
Warrenton is located at 38°48′57″N 91°8′25″W (38.815951, -91.140164). According to the United States Census Bureau, the city has a total area of 8.46 square miles (21.91 km^{2}), of which 8.37 square miles (21.68 km^{2}) is land and 0.09 square miles (0.23 km^{2}) is water.

=== Climate ===
Climate data for Warrenton, Missouri (1991–2020 normals, extremes 1893–present)
Month	Jan	Feb	Mar	Apr	May	Jun	Jul	Aug	Sep	Oct	Nov	Dec	Year
Record high °F (°C)	76 (24)	85 (29)	92 (33)	94 (34)	100 (38)	106 (41)	114 (46)	110 (43)	105 (41)	97 (36)	89 (32)	75 (24)	114 (46)
Mean daily maximum °F (°C)	38.9 (3.8)	44.3 (6.8)	54.9 (12.7)	66.4 (19.1)	75.1 (23.9)	83.7 (28.7)	87.8 (31.0)	86.5 (30.3)	79.7 (26.5)	68.0 (20.0)	54.5 (12.5)	43.0 (6.1)	65.2 (18.4)
Daily mean °F (°C)	29.3 (−1.5)	33.7 (0.9)	43.9 (6.6)	54.9 (12.7)	64.0 (17.8)	73.3 (22.9)	77.1 (25.1)	75.5 (24.2)	67.9 (19.9)	56.3 (13.5)	44.3 (6.8)	34.0 (1.1)	54.5 (12.5)
Mean daily minimum °F (°C)	19.6 (−6.9)	23.1 (−4.9)	32.9 (0.5)	43.4 (6.3)	52.9 (11.6)	62.8 (17.1)	66.4 (19.1)	64.5 (18.1)	56.1 (13.4)	44.6 (7.0)	34.1 (1.2)	25.1 (−3.8)	43.8 (6.6)
Record low °F (°C)	−21 (−29)	−22 (−30)	−11 (−24)	13 (−11)	29 (−2)	39 (4)	43 (6)	42 (6)	29 (−2)	16 (−9)	−3 (−19)	−21 (−29)	−22 (−30)
Average precipitation inches (mm)	2.35 (60)	2.18 (55)	2.64 (67)	4.63 (118)	5.12 (130)	4.51 (115)	3.93 (100)	3.54 (90)	3.48 (88)	3.23 (82)	3.46 (88)	2.40 (61)	41.47 (1,053)
Source: NOAA

== Demographics ==
Historical population
Census	Pop.	Note	%±
1860	480		—
1870	588		22.5%
1880	299		−49.1%
1890	664		122.1%
1900	770		16.0%
1910	795		3.2%
1920	800		0.6%
1930	1,250		56.3%
1940	1,254		0.3%
1950	1,584		26.3%
1960	1,869		18.0%
1970	2,057		10.1%
1980	3,219		56.5%
1990	3,564		10.7%
2000	5,281		48.2%
2010	7,880		49.2%
2020	8,429		7.0%
2024 (est.)	9,420		11.8%
U.S. Decennial Census

=== 2020 census ===
As of the 2020 census, Warrenton had a population of 8,429 and 2,187 families. The median age was 34.7 years. 26.8% of residents were under the age of 18 and 14.5% of residents were 65 years of age or older. For every 100 females there were 94.3 males, and for every 100 females age 18 and over there were 92.4 males age 18 and over.

The population density was 931.4 inhabitants per square mile (359.6/km^{2}). 95.2% of residents lived in urban areas, while 4.8% lived in rural areas.

There were 3,205 households in Warrenton, of which 35.3% had children under the age of 18 living in them. Of all households, 43.3% were married-couple households, 17.4% were households with a male householder and no spouse or partner present, and 29.1% were households with a female householder and no spouse or partner present. About 27.4% of all households were made up of individuals and 12.1% had someone living alone who was 65 years of age or older. The average household size was 2.6 and the average family size was 2.9.

There were 3,514 housing units, of which 8.8% were vacant. The homeowner vacancy rate was 2.4% and the rental vacancy rate was 10.0%.

Racial composition as of the 2020 census
Race	Number	Percent
White	7,315	86.8%
Black or African American	215	2.6%
American Indian and Alaska Native	43	0.5%
Asian	59	0.7%
Native Hawaiian and Other Pacific Islander	0	0.0%
Some other race	147	1.7%
Two or more races	650	7.7%
Hispanic or Latino (of any race)	355	4.2%

=== Income and poverty ===
The 2016–2020 5-year American Community Survey estimates show that the median household income was $47,804 (with a margin of error of +/- $9,675) and the median family income was $50,649 (+/- $8,826). Males had a median income of $27,470 (+/- $8,266) versus $23,846 (+/- $4,677) for females. The median income for those above 16 years old was $26,434 (+/- $2,136). Approximately, 17.0% of families and 22.6% of the population were below the poverty line, including 38.8% of those under the age of 18 and 9.0% of those ages 65 or over.

=== 2010 census ===
As of the census of 2010, there were 7,880 people, 2,927 households, and 1,969 families living in the city. The population density was 941.5 inhabitants per square mile (363.5/km^{2}). There were 3,196 housing units at an average density of 381.8 per square mile (147.4/km^{2}). The racial makeup of the city was 93.9% White, 2.1% African American, 0.6% Native American, 0.7% Asian, 0.1% Pacific Islander, 0.9% from other races, and 1.8% from two or more races. Hispanic or Latino of any race were 3.7% of the population.

There were 2,927 households, of which 39.6% had children under the age of 18 living with them, 47.0% were married couples living together, 15.1% had a female householder with no husband present, 5.2% had a male householder with no wife present, and 32.7% were non-families. 27.1% of all households were made up of individuals, and 12.5% had someone living alone who was 65 years of age or older. The average household size was 2.61 and the average family size was 3.17.

The median age in the city was 32.4 years. 29.1% of residents were under the age of 18; 8.8% were between the ages of 18 and 24; 28.2% were from 25 to 44; 21.1% were from 45 to 64; and 12.8% were 65 years of age or older. The gender makeup of the city was 47.9% male and 52.1% female.

=== 2000 census ===
As of the census of 2000, there were 5,281 people, 1,985 households, and 1,363 families living in the city. The population density was 720.6 inhabitants per square mile (278.2/km^{2}). There were 2,110 housing units at an average density of 287.9 per square mile (111.2/km^{2}). The racial makeup of the city was 95.64% White, 1.70% African American, 0.42% Native American, 0.38% Asian, 0.04% Pacific Islander, 0.57% from other races, and 1.25% from two or more races. Hispanic or Latino of any race were 1.29% of the population.

There were 1,985 households, out of which 37.9% had children under the age of 18 living with them, 50.8% were married couples living together, 13.6% had a female householder with no husband present, and 31.3% were non-families. 26.5% of all households were made up of individuals, and 10.9% had someone living alone who was 65 years of age or older. The average household size was 2.59 and the average family size was 3.14.

In the city, the population was spread out, with 30.0% under the age of 18, 9.4% from 18 to 24, 30.3% from 25 to 44, 16.8% from 45 to 64, and 13.6% who were 65 years of age or older. The median age was 32 years. For every 100 females, there were 88.4 males. For every 100 females age 18 and over, there were 85.7 males.

The median income for a household in the city was $53.742, and the median income for a family was $68.740. Males had a median income of $36,809 versus $22,662 for females. The per capita income for the city was $16,431. About 8.0% of families and 10.6% of the population were below the poverty line, including 11.4% of those under age 18 and 15.1% of those age 65 or over.

== Economy ==
Warrenton has direct access to both rail and interstate traffic via Interstate 70. Manufacturing consists of light industry, a copper foundry which is no longer run, and several quarries in the area. The town's primary sources of external revenue are service facilities for travellers. A notable company in Warrenton is SAF Holland. Warrenton is also home to the global headquarters of Child Evangelism Fellowship

Warren County R-III School District is the largest employer in Warren County.

In 2018, the city of Warrenton opened a second I-70 overpass, about 2 miles west of the original State Road 47 overpass. This was completed to account for future growth in the city.

== Education ==
Warrenton and the adjacent city of Truesdale are within the Warren County R-III School District, which is fully accredited in the state of Missouri. The district currently has six buildings: Warrenton High School, Daniel Boone Elementary, Warrior Ridge Elementary, Rebecca Boone Elementary, Black Hawk Middle School, Central office/ Early Childhood center.

Warrenton is also home to Holy Rosary School, a Growing Catholic school serving families with children in Pre K through eighth grade.

The Central Wesleyan College was an important German-American institution from 1864 to 1941. After closing, one of the campus buildings burned on February 17, 1957 killing 72 persons in the Warrenton Nursing Home Fire.

Warrenton has a public library, a branch of the Scenic Regional Library system.

== Media ==
- KFAV, 99.9 MHz FM station featuring country music, sister station to KWRE
- KWRE, 730 kHz AM station with 95.1 MHz FM translator K236CK featuring country music, sister station to KFAV

== Notable people ==
- George H. Middelkamp, 24th State Treasurer of Missouri
- Carl O. Sauer, American Geographer
