= Case, Warren County, Missouri =

Unincorporated community in the US state of Missouri

Coordinates: 38°44′06″N 91°22′27″W

Case is an unincorporated community in Warren County, in the U.S. state of Missouri.

== History ==
Case had its start in the 1890s when the railroad was extended to that point. A post office called Case was established in 1893, and remained in operation until 1946. The community most likely has the name of a railroad promoter.
