= Wright City, Missouri =

- City
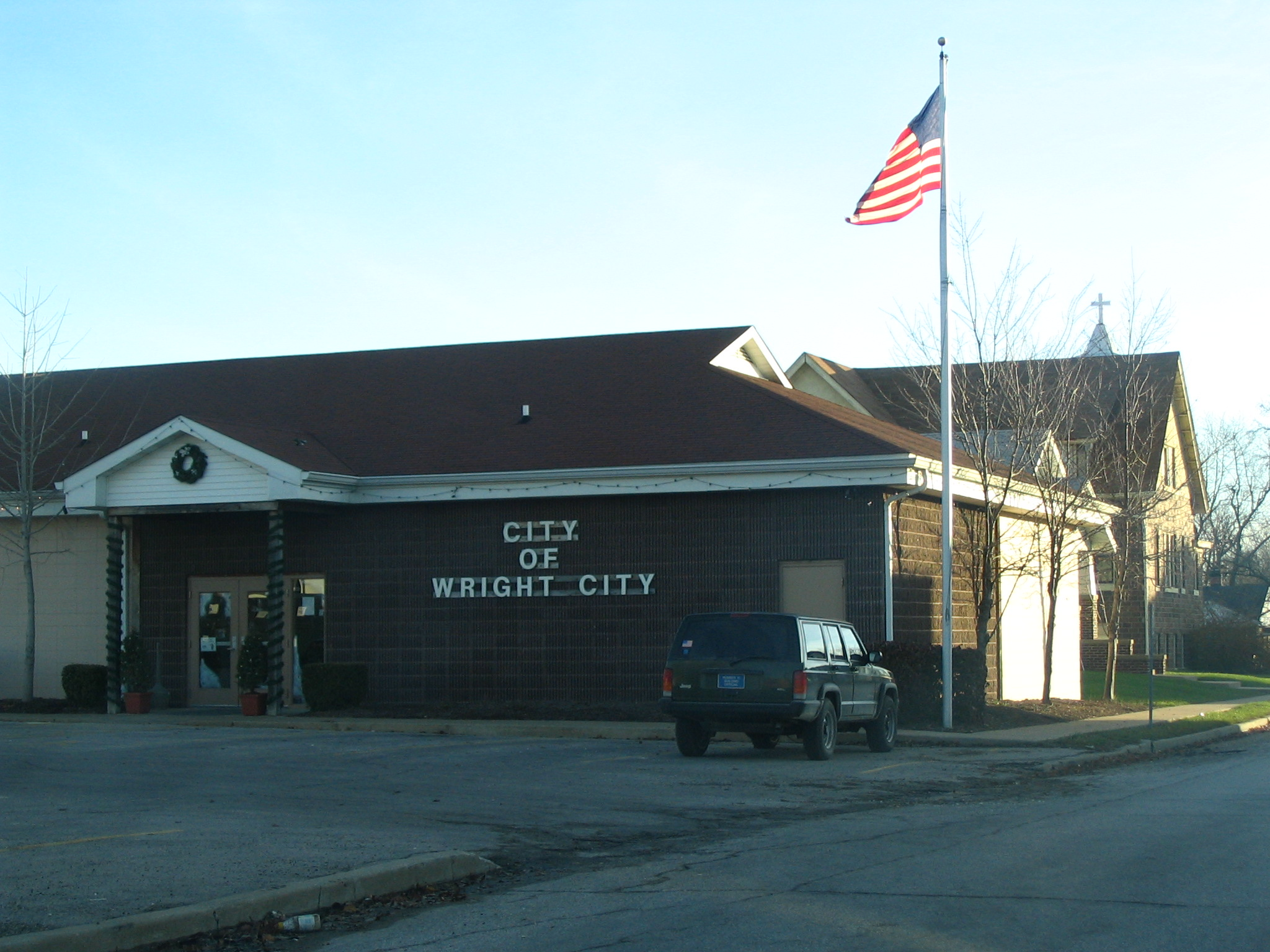
- Wright City town hall.

- Location of Wright City, Missouri
- Coordinates: 38°49′40″N 91°1′27″W
- Country: United States
- State: Missouri
- County: Warren
- Incorporated: 1869

Government
  - Mayor: Michelle Heiliger

Area
  - Total: 6.16 sq mi (15.95 km^{2})
  - Land: 6.06 sq mi (15.70 km^{2})
  - Water: 0.097 sq mi (0.25 km^{2})
- Elevation: 732 ft (223 m)

Population (2020)
  - Total: 4,881
  - Estimate (2023): 5,575
  - Density: 805.4/sq mi (310.98/km^{2})
- Time zone: UTC-6 (Central (CST))
  - Summer (DST): UTC-5 (CDT)
- ZIP code: 63390
- Area code: 636
- FIPS code: 29-81124
- GNIS feature ID: 0736368
- Website: wrightcitymo.gov

Wright City is a city in Warren County, Missouri, United States. It is located on Interstate 70 at mile marker 200 approximately 50 miles (80 km) west of downtown St. Louis. Wright City is a small, semi-rural community area with primarily single-family housing, with some multi-family dwellings. As of the 2020 census, Wright City had a population of 4,881. It has a number of small stores and restaurants. It has various types of light to heavy industrial businesses.

== History ==
Wright City was laid out in 1857, and was named after Dr. Henry C. Wright, a first settler. A post office called Wright City has been in operation since 1858. The Southwestern Bell Repeater Station-Wright City was listed on the National Register of Historic Places in 2007.

== Geography ==
Wright City is located at 38°49′40″N 91°1′27″W (38.827878, -91.024280). According to the United States Census Bureau, the city has a total area of 6.06 square miles (15.70 km^{2}), of which, 5.97 square miles (15.46 km^{2}) is land and 0.09 square miles (0.23 km^{2}) is water.

== Demographics ==
Historical population
Census	Pop.	Note	%±
1880	393		—
1890	383		−2.5%
1900	336		−12.3%
1910	377		12.2%
1920	402		6.6%
1930	429		6.7%
1940	436		1.6%
1950	543		24.5%
1960	738		35.9%
1970	943		27.8%
1980	1,179		25.0%
1990	1,250		6.0%
2000	1,532		22.6%
2010	3,119		103.6%
2020	4,881		56.5%
2024 (est.)	5,723		17.3%
U.S. Decennial Census

=== 2020 census ===
As of the 2020 census, Wright City had a population of 4,881. The median age was 31.9 years. 29.2% of residents were under the age of 18 and 10.3% of residents were 65 years of age or older. For every 100 females there were 99.1 males, and for every 100 females age 18 and over there were 96.9 males age 18 and over.

0.0% of residents lived in urban areas, while 100.0% lived in rural areas.

There were 1,784 households in Wright City, of which 40.7% had children under the age of 18 living in them. Of all households, 48.5% were married-couple households, 17.7% were households with a male householder and no spouse or partner present, and 22.2% were households with a female householder and no spouse or partner present. About 22.8% of all households were made up of individuals and 6.5% had someone living alone who was 65 years of age or older.

There were 1,901 housing units, of which 6.2% were vacant. The homeowner vacancy rate was 1.4% and the rental vacancy rate was 4.4%.

Racial composition as of the 2020 census
Race	Number	Percent
White	3,949	80.9%
Black or African American	258	5.3%
American Indian and Alaska Native	26	0.5%
Asian	13	0.3%
Native Hawaiian and Other Pacific Islander	1	0.0%
Some other race	235	4.8%
Two or more races	399	8.2%
Hispanic or Latino (of any race)	391	8.0%

=== 2010 census ===
As of the census of 2010, there were 3,119 people, 1,178 households, and 823 families residing in the city. The population density was 522.4 inhabitants per square mile (201.7/km^{2}). There were 1,288 housing units at an average density of 215.7 per square mile (83.3/km^{2}). The racial makeup of the city was 87.0% White, 5.7% African American, 0.2% Native American, 0.4% Asian, 3.7% from other races, and 3.0% from two or more races. Hispanic or Latino of any race were 7.2% of the population.

There were 1,178 households, of which 41.9% had children under the age of 18 living with them, 46.5% were married couples living together, 16.5% had a female householder with no husband present, 6.9% had a male householder with no wife present, and 30.1% were non-families. 23.3% of all households were made up of individuals, and 6.5% had someone living alone who was 65 years of age or older. The average household size was 2.65 and the average family size was 3.10.

The median age in the city was 31 years. 29.5% of residents were under the age of 18; 9% were between the ages of 18 and 24; 31.4% were from 25 to 44; 21.2% were from 45 to 64; and 8.8% were 65 years of age or older. The gender makeup of the city was 49.1% male and 50.9% female.

=== 2000 census ===
As of the census of 2000, there were 1,532 people, 608 households, and 403 families residing in the city. The population density was 612.7 inhabitants per square mile (236.6/km^{2}). There were 661 housing units at an average density of 264.4 per square mile (102.1/km^{2}). The racial makeup of the city was 88.77% White, 6.27% African American, 0.72% Native American, 0.07% Asian, 2.74% from other races, and 1.44% from two or more races. Hispanic or Latino of any race were 6.20% of the population.

There were 608 households, out of which 35.7% had children under the age of 18 living with them, 42.4% were married couples living together, 17.6% had a female householder with no husband present, and 33.6% were non-families. 29.4% of all households were made up of individuals, and 12.8% had someone living alone who was 65 years of age or older. The average household size was 2.52 and the average family size was 3.05.

In the city, the population was spread out, with 29.0% under the age of 18, 12.1% from 18 to 24, 30.1% from 25 to 44, 17.7% from 45 to 64, and 11.0% who were 65 years of age or older. The median age was 31 years. For every 100 females, there were 95.2 males. For every 100 females age 18 and over, there were 83.3 males.

The median income for a household in the city was $30,179, and the median income for a family was $35,563. Males had a median income of $28,977 versus $21,607 for females. The per capita income for the city was $17,153. About 12.5% of families and 14.6% of the population were below the poverty line, including 18.5% of those under age 18 and 14.3% of those age 65 or over.

== Education ==
Public education in Wright City is administered by Wright City R-II School District, which was founded in 1870, which operates two elementary schools, one middle school, and Wright City High School. Liberty Christian Academy is a private institution for students in kindergarten through grade twelve.

Wright City has a public library, a branch of the Scenic Regional Library system.

== Arts and culture ==
From 1992 to 2007, Wright City was home to the Elvis Is Alive Museum, run by Baptist minister Bill Beeny in his local general store, which explored Beeny's theory that the singer Elvis Presley is still living. In 2007, Beeny sold the museum's collection of artifacts on eBay, and the museum briefly reopened in Hattiesburg, Mississippi before being placed into storage.

== Notable people ==
Two American theologians, the brothers Reinhold Niebuhr and H. Richard Niebuhr were born in Wright City in 1892 and 1894 respectively.

The actor Rand Brooks, known for his roles of Corporal Randy Boone on the TV series The Adventures of Rin-Tin-Tin and as Charles Hamilton in Gone with the Wind, was born in Wright City.
