= Warren County, Missouri =

County in Missouri, United States

- County
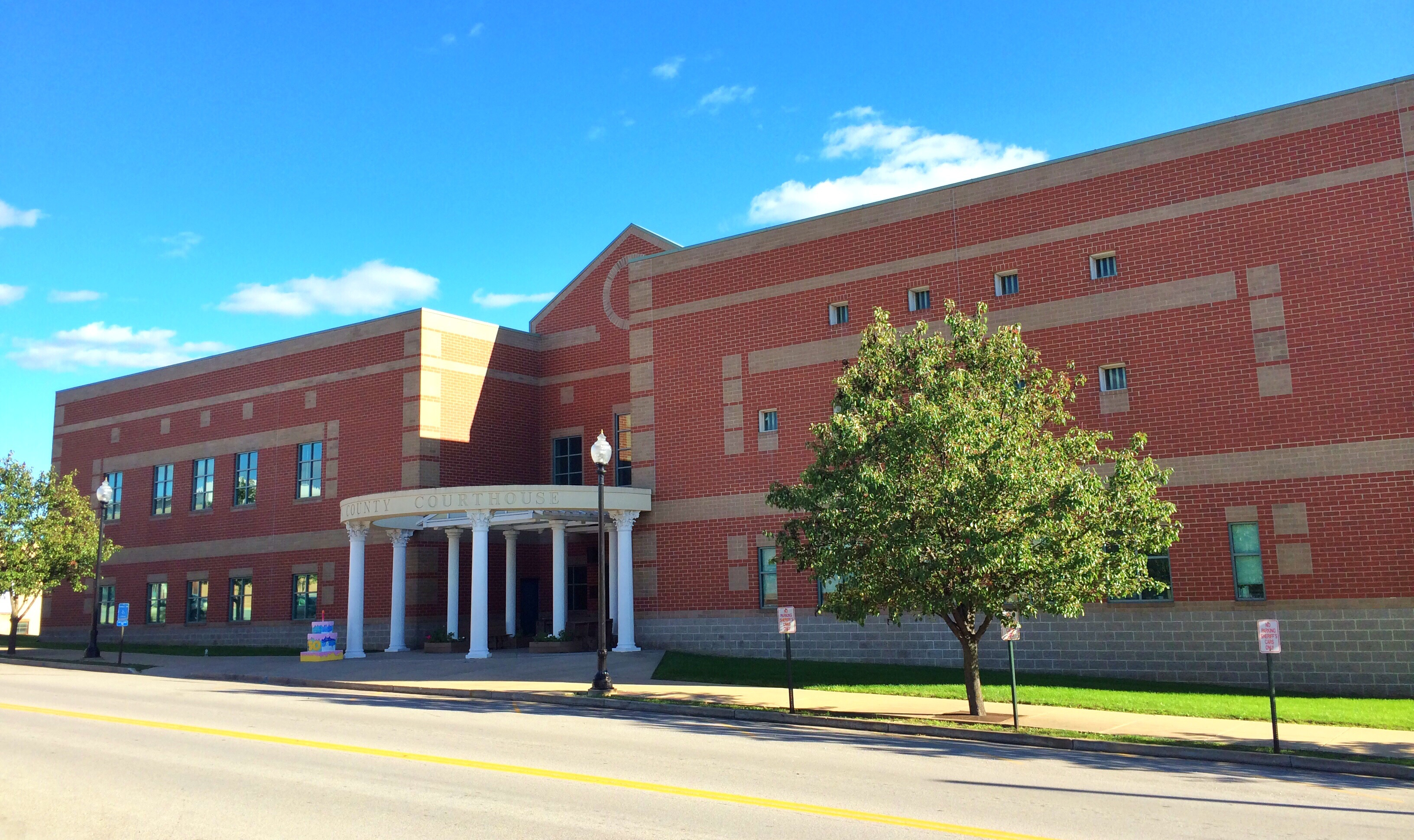
- The Warren County Courthouse in Warrenton

- Location within the U.S. state of Missouri
- Coordinates: 38°46′N 91°10′W
- Country: United States
- State: Missouri
- Founded: January 5, 1833
- Named for: General Joseph Warren
- Seat: Warrenton
- Largest city: Warrenton

Area
  - Total: 438 sq mi (1,130 km^{2})
  - Land: 429 sq mi (1,110 km^{2})
  - Water: 9.2 sq mi (24 km^{2}) 2.1%

Population (2020)
  - Total: 35,532
  - Estimate (2025): 39,016 ▲
  - Density: 82.8/sq mi (32.0/km^{2})
- Time zone: UTC−6 (Central)
  - Summer (DST): UTC−5 (CDT)
- Congressional districts: 2nd, 3rd
- Website: warrencountymo.org

Warren County is a county located in the eastern portion of the U.S. state of Missouri. As of the 2020 census, the population was 35,532. The county is located on the north side of the Missouri River. Its county seat is Warrenton. The county was established on January 5, 1833, and was named for General Joseph Warren, who died in the Battle of Bunker Hill during the American Revolutionary War.

Warren County is part of the St. Louis, MO-IL Metropolitan Statistical Area. The county is traversed by Route 94, called the "Missouri Weinstrasse" because of the many vineyards from Marthasville east into St. Charles County. Warren County is also part of the Missouri Rhineland, with award-winning wineries located on both sides of the Missouri River.

== Geography ==
According to the U.S. Census Bureau, the county has a total area of 438 square miles (1,130 km^{2}), of which 429 square miles (1,110 km^{2}) is land and 9.2 square miles (24 km^{2}) (2.1%) is water.

=== Adjacent counties ===
- Lincoln County (north)
- St. Charles County (east)
- Franklin County (south)
- Gasconade County (southwest)
- Montgomery County (west)

=== Major highways ===
- Interstate 70
- U.S. Route 40
- Route 47
- Route 94

== Demographics ==
Historical population
Census	Pop.	Note	%±
1840	4,253		—
1850	5,860		37.8%
1860	8,839		50.8%
1870	9,673		9.4%
1880	10,806		11.7%
1890	9,913		−8.3%
1900	9,919		0.1%
1910	9,123		−8.0%
1920	8,490		−6.9%
1930	8,082		−4.8%
1940	7,734		−4.3%
1950	7,666		−0.9%
1960	8,750		14.1%
1970	9,699		10.8%
1980	14,900		53.6%
1990	19,534		31.1%
2000	24,525		25.6%
2010	32,513		32.6%
2020	35,532		9.3%
2025 (est.)	39,016	▲	9.8%
U.S. Decennial Census; 1790-1960 1900-1990; 1990-2000 2010

=== 2020 census ===
As of the 2020 census, the county had a population of 35,532. The median age was 40.7 years. 23.3% of residents were under the age of 18 and 17.6% of residents were 65 years of age or older. For every 100 females there were 100.5 males, and for every 100 females age 18 and over there were 99.6 males age 18 and over.

The racial makeup of the county was 88.4% White, 2.1% Black or African American, 0.5% American Indian and Alaska Native, 0.4% Asian, 0.0% Native Hawaiian and Pacific Islander, 1.9% from some other race, and 6.8% from two or more races. Hispanic or Latino residents of any race comprised 3.9% of the population.

26.4% of residents lived in urban areas, while 73.6% lived in rural areas.

There were 13,578 households in the county, of which 31.4% had children under the age of 18 living with them and 19.9% had a female householder with no spouse or partner present. About 22.3% of all households were made up of individuals and 9.4% had someone living alone who was 65 years of age or older.

There were 15,355 housing units, of which 11.6% were vacant. Among occupied housing units, 79.7% were owner-occupied and 20.3% were renter-occupied. The homeowner vacancy rate was 1.6% and the rental vacancy rate was 7.7%.

=== Racial and ethnic composition ===
The racial and ethnic composition of the county from 1980 through 2020 is shown below.

Warren County, Missouri – Racial and ethnic composition Note: the US Census treats Hispanic/Latino as an ethnic category. This table excludes Latinos from the racial categories and assigns them to a separate category. Hispanics/Latinos may be of any race.
Race / Ethnicity (NH = Non-Hispanic)	Pop 1980	Pop 1990	Pop 2000	Pop 2010	Pop 2020	% 1980	% 1990	% 2000	% 2010	% 2020
White alone (NH)	14,303	18,790	23,330	30,201	31,103	95.99%	96.19%	95.13%	92.89%	87.54%
Black or African American alone (NH)	488	507	474	598	718	3.28%	2.60%	1.93%	1.84%	2.02%
Native American or Alaska Native alone (NH)	8	45	102	113	116	0.05%	0.23%	0.42%	0.35%	0.33%
Asian alone (NH)	17	30	53	123	143	0.11%	0.15%	0.22%	0.38%	0.40%
Native Hawaiian or Pacific Islander alone (NH)	x	x	3	10	0	x	x	0.01%	0.03%	0.00%
Other race alone (NH)	12	10	16	8	111	0.08%	0.05%	0.07%	0.02%	0.31%
Mixed race or Multiracial (NH)	x	x	233	503	1,941	x	x	0.95%	1.55%	5.46%
Hispanic or Latino (any race)	72	152	314	957	1,400	0.48%	0.78%	1.28%	2.94%	3.94%
Total	14,900	19,534	24,525	32,513	35,532	100.00%	100.00%	100.00%	100.00%	100.00%

=== 2000 census ===
As of the census of 2000, there were 24,525 people, 9,185 households, and 6,888 families residing in the county. The population density was 57 inhabitants per square mile (22/km^{2}). There were 11,046 housing units at an average density of 26 units per square mile (10/km^{2}). The racial makeup of the county was 95.89% White, 1.94% Black or African American, 0.45% Native American, 0.24% Asian, 0.02% Pacific Islander, 0.44% from other races, and 1.02% from two or more races. Approximately 1.28% of the population were Hispanic or Latino of any race. Among the major ancestries reported in Warren County were 41.4% German, 13.8% American, 10.2% Irish and 7.0% English ancestry.

There were 9,185 households, out of which 34.70% had children under the age of 18 living with them, 62.20% were married couples living together, 8.90% had a female householder with no husband present, and 25.00% were non-families. 20.80% of all households were made up of individuals, and 8.80% had someone living alone who was 65 years of age or older. The average household size was 2.64 and the average family size was 3.05.

In the county, the population was spread out, with 26.90% under the age of 18, 7.60% from 18 to 24, 28.80% from 25 to 44, 23.70% from 45 to 64, and 13.00% who were 65 years of age or older. The median age was 37 years. For every 100 females there were 98.60 males. For every 100 females age 18 and over, there were 96.10 males.

The median income for a household in the county was $41,016, and the median income for a family was $46,863. Males had a median income of $36,315 versus $23,443 for females. The per capita income for the county was $19,690. About 6.40% of families and 8.60% of the population were below the poverty line, including 10.50% of those under age 18 and 10.40% of those age 65 or over.

== Politics ==
=== Local ===
All of the elected positions in the county are held by Republicans.

Warren County, Missouri

Elected countywide officials
Assessor	Kathryn Smith	Republican
Circuit Clerk	Tim Beard	Republican
County Clerk	Denise Stotler	Republican
Collector	Julie Schaumberg	Republican
Commissioner (presiding)	Joe Gildehaus	Republican
Commissioner (district 1)	Matt Flake	Republican
Commissioner (district 2)	Dave Mikus	Republican
Coroner	Glenn Craig	Republican
Prosecuting Attorney	Kelly King	Republican
Public Administrator	Melissa Dempsey	Republican
Recorder	Deborah Engemann	Republican
Sheriff	Kevin Harrison	Republican
Surveyor	Robert L. Lewis	Republican
Treasurer	Jeff Hoelscher	Republican

=== State ===
Past Gubernatorial Elections Results
Year	Republican	Democratic	Third Parties
2024	74.39% 14,719	23.47% 4,644	2.04% 423
2020	70.52% 12,892	26.91% 4,920	2.57% 469
2016	57.58% 9,056	38.50% 6,055	3.93% 618
2012	50.34% 7,338	46.78% 6,819	2.88% 419
2008	49.26% 7,617	49.07% 7,587	1.68% 259
2004	56.08% 7,488	42.61% 5,689	1.31% 175
2000	56.76% 6,060	40.45% 4,318	2.79% 298
1996	49.93% 4,298	47.67% 4,103	2.40% 207

Warren County is divided into two legislative districts in the Missouri House of Representatives, both of which are held by Republicans.

- District 42 — Bart Korman (R-High Hill). Consists of most of the entire county, including the communities of Marthasville, Pendeleton, Truesdale, and Warrenton.

There were no incumbents in this race.

Missouri House of Representatives — District 42 — Warren County (2018)
Party	Candidate	Votes	%	±%
Republican	Jeff Porter	10765	69.6	
Democratic	Joseph Widner	4698	30.4	

Missouri House of Representatives — District 42 — Warren County (2016)
Party	Candidate	Votes	%	±%
Republican	Bart Korman	9,880	100.00%	+25.74

Missouri House of Representatives — District 42 — Warren County (2014)
Party	Candidate	Votes	%	±%
Republican	Bart Korman	4,210	74.26%	−25.74
Democratic	Rod Sturgeon	1,459	25.74%	+25.74

Missouri House of Representatives — District 42 — Warren County (2012)
Party	Candidate	Votes	%	±%
Republican	Bart Korman	8,812	100.00%	

- District 63 — Bryan Spencer (R-Wentzville). Consists of the communities of Foristell, Innsbrook, and Wright City.

Missouri House of Representatives — District 63 — Warren County (2016)
Party	Candidate	Votes	%	±%
Republican	Bryan Spencer	3,039	70.67%	+0.88
Democratic	Liz Gattra	1,261	29.33%	−0.88

Missouri House of Representatives — District 63 — Warren County (2014)
Party	Candidate	Votes	%	±%
Republican	Bryan Spencer	1,423	69.79%	+11.67
Democratic	Bryan Pinette	616	30.21%	−11.67

Missouri House of Representatives — District 63 — Warren County (2012)
Party	Candidate	Votes	%	±%
Republican	Bryan Spencer	2,233	58.12%	
Democratic	Bill Stinson	1,609	41.88%	

Warren County is a part of Missouri's 10th District in the Missouri Senate and is currently represented by Jeanie Riddle (R-Fulton). The 10th Senatorial District consists of all of Audrain, Callaway, Lincoln, Monroe, Montgomery, and Warren counties.

Missouri Senate — District 10 — Warren County (2014)
Party	Candidate	Votes	%	±%
Republican	Jeanie Riddle	5,475	70.78%	
Democratic	Ed Schieffer	2,260	29.22%	

=== Federal ===
U.S. Senate — Missouri — (2016)
Party	Candidate	Votes	%	±%
Republican	Roy Blunt	8,918	56.69%	+8.24
Democratic	Jason Kander	5,928	37.68%	−7.68
Libertarian	Jonathan Dine	445	2.83%	−3.36
Green	Johnathan McFarland	183	1.16%	+1.16
Constitution	Fred Ryman	257	1.63%	+1.63

U.S. Senate — Missouri — (2012)
Party	Candidate	Votes	%	±%
Republican	Todd Akin	7,040	48.45%	
Democratic	Claire McCaskill	6,591	45.36%	
Libertarian	Jonathan Dine	899	6.19%	

Warren County is included in Missouri's 3rd Congressional District by Bob Onder (R), and Missouri's 2nd congressional district by Ann Wagner (R), in the U.S. House of Representatives.

U.S. House of Representatives — Missouri's 3rd Congressional District — Warren County (2016)
Party	Candidate	Votes	%	±%
Republican	Blaine Luetkemeyer	10,884	70.55%	−1.61
Democratic	Kevin Miller	3,847	24.94%	+0.96
Libertarian	Dan Hogan	480	3.11%	−0.75
Constitution	Doanita Simmons	216	1.40%	+1.40

U.S. House of Representatives — Missouri's 3rd Congressional District — Warren County (2014)
Party	Candidate	Votes	%	±%
Republican	Blaine Luetkemeyer	5,587	72.16%	+6.07
Democratic	Courtney Denton	1,857	23.98%	−6.53
Libertarian	Steven Hedrick	299	3.86%	+0.46

U.S. House of Representatives — Missouri's 3rd Congressional District — Warren County (2012)
Party	Candidate	Votes	%	±%
Republican	Blaine Luetkemeyer	9,429	66.09%	
Democratic	Eric Mayer	4,352	30.51%	
Libertarian	Steven Wilson	485	3.40%	

==== Political culture ====
United States presidential election results for Warren County, Missouri
Year	Republican		Democratic		Third party(ies)	
Year	No.	%	No.	%	No.	%
1888	1,498	69.80%	589	27.45%	59	2.75%
1892	1,360	64.85%	685	32.67%	52	2.48%
1896	1,680	70.65%	691	29.06%	7	0.29%
1900	1,599	71.45%	579	25.87%	60	2.68%
1904	1,537	75.31%	435	21.31%	69	3.38%
1908	1,714	76.14%	484	21.50%	53	2.35%
1912	1,067	52.20%	431	21.09%	546	26.71%
1916	1,752	76.67%	487	21.31%	46	2.01%
1920	3,512	84.97%	545	13.19%	76	1.84%
1924	2,667	76.03%	644	18.36%	197	5.62%
1928	2,610	72.10%	999	27.60%	11	0.30%
1932	1,974	56.14%	1,513	43.03%	29	0.82%
1936	2,639	66.96%	1,277	32.40%	25	0.63%
1940	3,403	78.34%	914	21.04%	27	0.62%
1944	3,017	78.42%	815	21.19%	15	0.39%
1948	2,380	68.63%	1,071	30.88%	17	0.49%
1952	2,977	72.66%	1,112	27.14%	8	0.20%
1956	2,852	70.19%	1,211	29.81%	0	0.00%
1960	2,946	67.68%	1,407	32.32%	0	0.00%
1964	2,323	54.97%	1,903	45.03%	0	0.00%
1968	2,669	62.55%	1,033	24.21%	565	13.24%
1972	3,530	74.24%	1,225	25.76%	0	0.00%
1976	3,214	59.19%	2,164	39.85%	52	0.96%
1980	4,366	64.75%	2,132	31.62%	245	3.63%
1984	5,150	72.39%	1,964	27.61%	0	0.00%
1988	4,452	60.07%	2,935	39.60%	24	0.32%
1992	2,953	34.10%	3,213	37.11%	2,493	28.79%
1996	3,768	43.78%	3,443	40.00%	1,396	16.22%
2000	5,979	55.67%	4,524	42.12%	237	2.21%
2004	7,883	58.69%	5,461	40.66%	88	0.66%
2008	8,675	55.69%	6,705	43.05%	196	1.26%
2012	9,150	62.35%	5,219	35.56%	307	2.09%
2016	11,111	70.39%	3,915	24.80%	758	4.80%
2020	13,222	71.96%	4,769	25.95%	384	2.09%
2024	14,915	74.22%	4,970	24.73%	210	1.05%

At the presidential level, like many exurban counties, Warren County tends to lean Republican. Bill Clinton in 1992 is the solitary Democratic presidential nominee to carry Warren County since Stephen Douglas in 1860, and Clinton only won with 37.1 percent of the vote.

Like most rural and exurban areas throughout Northeast Missouri, voters in Warren County generally adhere to socially and culturally conservative principles which tend to influence their Republican leanings. The initiative narrowly passed the state with 51 percent of support from voters as Missouri became one of the first states in the nation to approve embryonic stem cell research. Despite Warren County's longstanding tradition of supporting socially conservative platforms, voters in the county have a penchant for advancing populist causes like increasing the minimum wage. In 2006, Missourians voted on a proposition (Proposition B) to increase the minimum wage in the state to $6.50 an hour—it passed Warren County with 77.48 percent of the vote. The proposition strongly passed every single county in Missouri with 78.99 percent voting in favor. (During the same election, voters in five other states also strongly approved increases in the minimum wage.)

=== Missouri presidential preference primary (2008) ===
Former U.S. Senator Hillary Rodham Clinton (D-New York) received more votes, a total of 1,971, than any candidate from either party in Warren County during the 2008 presidential primary.

== Education ==
School districts in the county include:

- Gasconade County R-I School District
- Montgomery County R-II School District
- Troy R-III School District
- Warren County R-III School District
- Washington School District
- Wright City R-II School District of Warren County

=== Public schools ===
- Warren County R-III School District - Warrenton
  - Daniel Boone Elementary School (PK-05)
  - Warrior Ridge Elementary School (K-05)
  - Rebecca Boone Elementary School (K-05)
  - Black Hawk Middle School (06-08)
  - Warrenton High School (09-12)
- Wright City R-II School District - Wright City
  - Wright City East Elementary School (K-01) - Foristell
  - Wright City Elementary School (02-04)
  - Wright City Middle School (05-08)
  - Wright City High School (09-12)

=== Private schools ===
- Holy Rosary School – Warrenton (K-08) – Roman Catholic
- St. Vincent De Paul School – Marthasville (K-08) – Roman Catholic
- St. Ignatius Loyola School – Marthasville (PK-08) – Roman Catholic

=== Public libraries ===
- Warrenton Branch Library, Scenic Regional Library

== Communities ==
=== Cities ===
- Foristell (Partly in St. Charles County)
- Marthasville
- Truesdale
- Warrenton (county seat)
- Wright City

=== Villages ===
- Innsbrook
- Pendleton
- Three Creeks

=== Unincorporated communities ===
- Bernheimer
- Bridgeport
- Case
- Concord Hill
- Dutzow
- Gore
- Holstein
- Hopewell
- Lippstadt
- Macedonia Neighborhood
- New Truxton
- Peers
- Pin Oak
- Pinckney
- Treloar

== Media ==
- KFAV, 99.9 mHz FM station featuring country music, sister station to KWRE
- KWRE, 730 kHz AM station featuring country music, sister station to KFAV

== See also ==
- National Register of Historic Places listings in Warren County, Missouri
