= Scott Swofford (American football) =

American football coach (1949–2000

Biographical details
- Born: October 11, 1949; St. Louis, Missouri, U.S.
- Died: September 3, 2000 (aged 50); St. Louis, Missouri, U.S.

Playing career
- 1968–1971: Central Methodist
- Position: Linebacker

Coaching career (HC unless noted)
- 1972: Fayette HS (MO)
- 1973–1975: Wentzville Holt HS (MO) (assistant)
- 1976: Central Missouri State (assistant)
- 1977–1978: Central Methodist (DC/OL)
- 1979–1980: Washburn (assistant)
- 1981: Tarkio
- 1984–1985: Grandview HS (Hillsboro, MO)
- 1986–1998: Wentzville Holt HS (MI)
- 1999–2000: Washington University (RB/ST)

Head coaching record
- Overall: 1–9 (college)

Scott O. Swofford (October 11, 1949 – September 3, 2000) was an American football and coach. At one time Swofford served as head coach at Tarkio College, but he was best known as the long time head football coach at Wentzville Holt High School in Wentzville, Missouri.

== Early life and playing career ==
Swofford was born in St. Louis, where he attended Cleveland High School. He played football at Cleveland, from which he graduated in 1968. Following graduation, he attended Central Methodist College in Fayette, Missouri, where he was a four-year starting linebacker. Swofford was named team captain in his senior year and was recognized as the team's most valuable player at the close of the season. He was All-District and an All-Conference player. In addition to football, Swofford also captained the rugby team for four years at Central Methodist. He graduated with a Bachelor of Science degree in Education in 1972.

Swofford also played Rugby competitively for the St. Louis Falcons Rugby team in the Missouri Rugby Football Union. The team, led by Swofford as captain, finished the 1979 season with a second place finish in the national championship among more than 3,000 rugby clubs in the nation.

== Coaching career ==
After graduating from Central Methodist in 1972, Swofford spent one year coaching and teaching at Fayette High School.

In February 1981, Swofford was named head football coach and associate director of admissions at Tarkio College in Tarkio, Missouri. Tarkio competed in the Heart of America Athletic Conference (HAAC). In taking the position, Swofford inherited the nation's longest losing streak, which at that time was 26 games. In the second game of the 1981 season, Swofford led the Tarkio Owls to a 20–12 victory over Culver–Stockton to end the nation's longest losing streak at 27 games. Despite securing the Owls first win in three seasons, Swofford's contract was not renewed after the first year at Tarkio. College officials indicated that Swofford overspent on the football budget, and Swofford said he was dismissed because of conflicts with the administration of the school. Swofford believed the school administrators did not like the boot camp atmosphere and strict discipline he brought to the football program.

In 1986, Swofford returned to Wentzville Holt High School, where he had previously served as an assistant from 1973 to 1975. This time the 36-year-old Swofford would be the head coach, hired to replace Dennis Graser following a 5-5 season in 1985. Swofford promised to instill discipline in the squad, both on and off the field. In addition to coaching football and teaching health and physical education, Swofford also served as head track coach for the Indians. During the mid-1990s at Holt, Swofford coached Dan Alexander, an All-Metro First Team running back recognized as the top player in St. Charles County, who went to play as a First Team All-Big 12 Conference linebacker/fullback for the Nebraska Cornhuskers. Alexander was later drafted by the Tennessee Titans in the 2001 NFL Draft. When his uniform number was retired at Holt High School in 2012, Alexander credited Swofford with much of his success on the field.

In 1999, Swofford began serving as an assistant coach of the Washington University Bears for two years coaching the running backs and special teams. In his first year at Washington University, he assisted in leading the team to its first NCAA playoff appearance in school history.

== Personal life and legacy ==
Swofford was a resident of Lake St. Louis, Missouri. He served as president of the St. Louis Metro Coaches Association from 1997 to 2000. He was also active in the Fellowship of Christian Athletes. Swofford died on September 3, 2000, after suffering a heart attack in the football team offices at Washington University while he was reviewing film of the team's win from the previous night. More than 3,000 people attended Swofford's memorial service that was held on the 50-yard line of Francis Field on September 6, 2000. Among the speaker's at Swofford's funeral was Missouri Lieutenant Governor Roger B. Wilson.

In April 2002, the board of the Wentzville School District voted to name the new football stadium at Timberland High School in honor of Scott Swofford, where he served as a teacher from the time the school opened in 2000 until his death.

In 2010, Swofford was posthumously inducted into the Hairston Sports Hall of Fame at Central Methodist University.

== Head coaching record ==
=== College ===
Year	Team	Overall	Conference	Standing	Bowl/playoffs
Tarkio Owls (Heart of America Athletic Conference) (1981)
1981	Tarkio	1–9	1–7	8th	
Tarkio:		1–9	1–7		
Total:		1–9			
