= Scott T. Rupp =

American politician (born 1973)

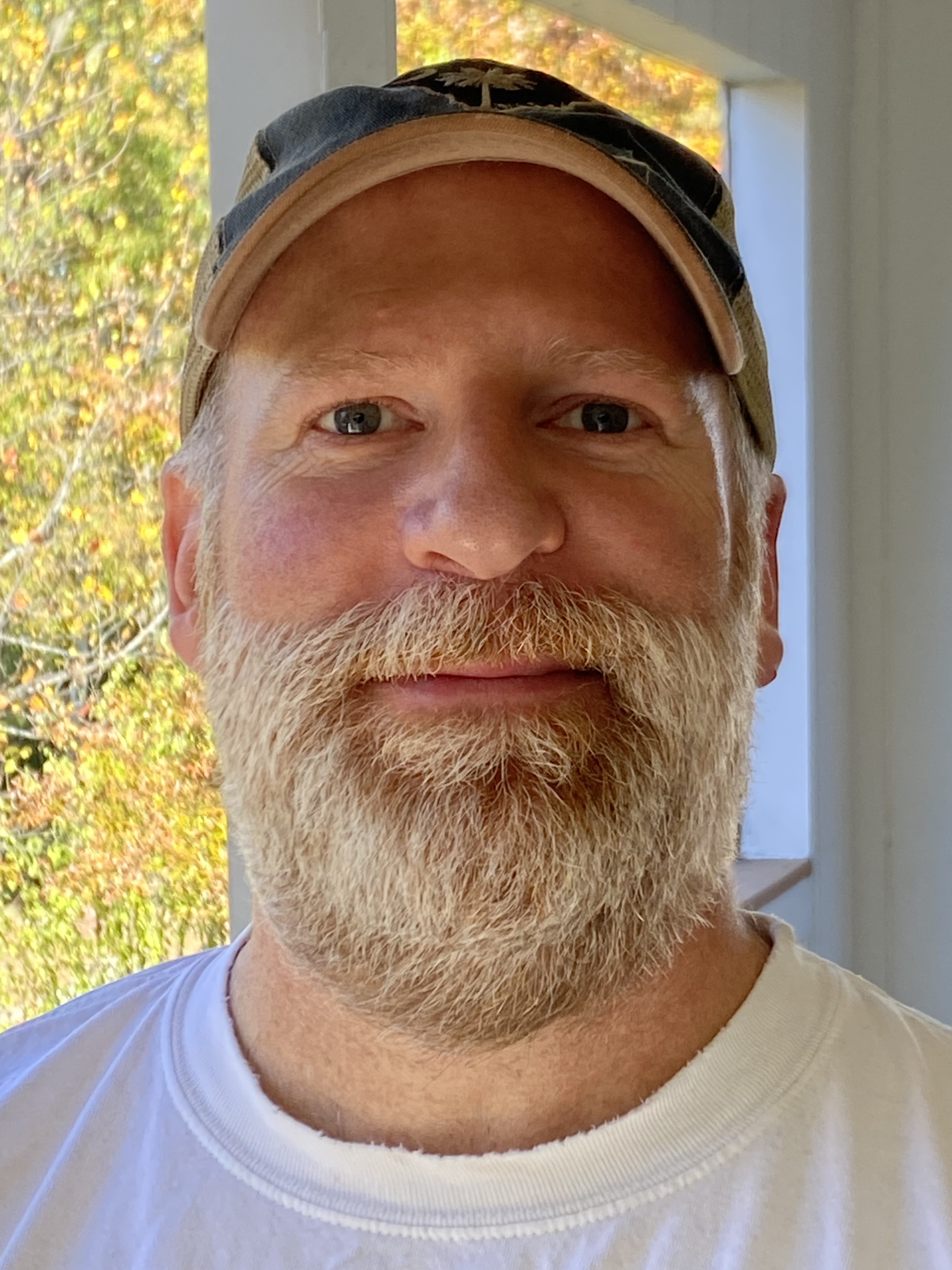

Member of the Missouri Senate from the 2nd district
- In office 2006 – April 3, 2014
- Succeeded by: Robert F. Onder

Member of the Missouri House of Representatives from the 13th district
- In office 2003–2006
- Preceded by: Jonathan Dolan
- Succeeded by: Robert F. Onder

Personal details
- Born: October 17, 1973 (age 52) Peoria, Illinois, U.S.
- Party: Republican

Scott T. Rupp (born October 17, 1973) is a former Republican member of the Missouri Senate, representing the 2nd District from 2006 to 2014. Previously he was a member of the Missouri House of Representatives from 2002 through 2006. In the Missouri Senate, Rupp represented all of Lincoln County and portions of St. Charles County. Elected to the Missouri Senate in a special election in April 2006, Scott was re-elected in November 2006 to serve his first full term. He was re-elected in November 2010 to his second full term in the Missouri Senate. Previously, he was twice elected to represent the citizens of northwest St. Charles County in the Missouri House of Representatives and received more than 65 percent of the vote in 2002 and 2004. In 2014 Rupp could not run for re-election due to term limits. In April 2014 he retired early to take a position on the Missouri Public Service Commission.

Rupp was born in Peoria, Illinois, the youngest of five children. His parents, Chester and Eleanor Rupp, moved the family to St. Charles when Scott was 10 years old. He graduated with honors from Duchesne High School in St. Charles, Missouri. After graduating high school, he supported himself while attending the University of Missouri in Columbia, Missouri. In 1995, after graduating with a political science degree, he started a small business. He and his brother, Gregory, founded a college preparatory company, Educational Funding & Financial Aid Specialists, in which they assisted parents of high school students in preparing their children for college. A former investment representative, he also founded the investment firm Rupp & Associates. He also started a mortgage brokerage called Educational Financing Company, which specialized in loans for parents of college-bound students. Upon his election to the Missouri Senate, he sold his businesses and took a position with UMB Bank in O'Fallon, where he is currently vice president of business development, specializing in commercial lending.

== Family ==
Scott currently resides in Wentzville, Missouri with his wife Carissa, his two children Noelle and Scottie, and three stepchildren, Hayley, Emily and Christian.

== Other ==
Senator Rupp was appointed to the National Coalition for Capitol (NCFC) Board of Advisors in November 2010. As a member of the NCFC Board of Advisors his role will be to help support economic development and job creation through long-term access to capital for entrepreneurs and small businesses at the state and federal levels.

== Awards ==
- Missouri Rehabilitation Association – certificate for outstanding contribution in regards to persons with disabilities (2009)
- Lewis & Clark Statesman Award – from the St. Louis Regional Chamber & Growth Association (2009)
- 40 under 40 – St. Louis Business Journal's ranking of the top 40 business and civic leaders under the age of 40 (2009)
- Spirit of Enterprise Legislative Award – from the Missouri Chamber of Commerce and Industry (2008)
- Lewis & Clark Statesman Award – from the St. Louis Regional Chamber & Growth Association (2008)
- St. Louis Business Journal Legislative Award (2008)
- State Legislator of the Year, Novogradac Community Development Foundation (2008)
- Missouri State Council of Firefighters Distinguished Legislator Award (2007)
- Missouri Community College Association Distinguished Legislator Award (2007)
- Legislator of the Year Award, Missouri Police Chief Association (2004)
- Friend of Agriculture by the Missouri Farm Bureau (2004)
- Hero of Mental Health from the Crider Center for Mental Health (2004)
- 100 Percent for Jobs Award from the Missouri Chamber (2005)
- 40 under 40 award – St. Louis Business Journal's ranking of the top 40 business and civic leaders under the age of 40 (2004)
- Family Advocacy & Community Training (FACT) – Leadership in Government Award (2010)
- American Cancer Society – Legislator of the Year Award (2010)
- Missouri Association of County Developmental Disabilities (MACDDS), Presidents Award for accomplishments with individuals with developmental disabilities (2010)
