= Fikes =

Fikes is a surname. Notable people with the surname include:

- Bettie Mae Fikes (born 1948), American singer and activist
- Deborah Fikes, American evangelical leader
- Richard Fikes (born 1942), American computer scientist

== See also ==
- Fike
