= Ethan Place =

American soldier

John "Ethan" Place
- Born: St. Louis, Missouri
- Military career
- Allegiance: United States of America
- Branch: United States Marine Corps
- Service years: 2001–05
- Rank: Corporal
- Conflicts: Fallujah during the Iraq War
- Awards: Silver Star
- Other work: marksmanship instructor

John Ethan Place is an American serviceman who served in the United States Marine Corps as a sniper. In Fallujah, which the US Army bombarded, the then-twenty-year-old sniper killed 32 people (insurgents) in thirteen days, from April 11 to April 24, 2004. He received the Silver Star, the military's third highest award.

== Early life ==
Ethan Place grew up in Lake St. Louis, Missouri and graduated from Wentzville Holt High School in 2001. He played varsity quarterback for three years in high school. He entertained some offers to play college football, but he was not sure he was ready to attend college. Ethan chose instead to enlist in the Marine Corps.

== Military service ==
Ethan enlisted in the Marine Corps and shipped out to boot camp less than a month after the September 11 attacks of 2001. He was convinced by a corporal to try to get into sniper school, where he was among twelve in a class of 24 that passed.

During the First Battle of Fallujah, Place amassed 32 confirmed kills from April 11 to April 24, 2004. On April 26 he left the cover of his defensive position to carry wounded Marines to safety, and killing five insurgents. His leaders thought enough of his actions that Place was nominated for a Bronze Star Medal. When leadership reviewed the Summary of Action that detailed his actions, they decided to elevate his honour to a Silver Star.

== Post-military career ==
After completing his military service, Place returned home to the St. Louis area and enrolled at Lindenwood University in 2006, with the goal of becoming a history teacher and football coach. While studying at Lindenwood, he began working as an assistant football coach under Chris Shields at Wentzville Holt High School. Place graduated from Lindenwood in 2010. In 2011, Place moved to Joplin, Missouri when Shields accepted the head coaching position at Joplin High School. Place served as an offensive coordinator and also taught American History at Joplin.

In 2015, Place returned to Wentzville to become head football coach at Holt High School. Place led the Indians to an 8–2 record in 2020, capped off by the team's first playoff win in eight years. In the day immediately following that first playoff win, the remainder of the 2020 season was canceled due to the COVID-19 pandemic.

Ethan has led the Holt Indians to their first state championship game after going 13–0, the Indians first ever undefeated season.
