= Chuck Gatschenberger =

American politician (born 1956)

Member of the Missouri House of Representatives from the 13th district
- In office January 2009 – January 2015
- Preceded by: Bob Onder
- Succeeded by: Nick Marshall

Personal details
- Born: February 28, 1956 (age 70) Springfield, Illinois
- Party: Republican
- Spouse: Divorced
- Education: University of Missouri-St. Louis
- Profession: Financial planner Education administrator

Chuck Gatschenberger (born February 28, 1956) is a Republican politician. He was a member of the Missouri House of Representatives, representing the 13th District which encompasses portions of Warren and St. Charles counties. He was first elected to the Missouri House in November, 2008. In 2014, Gatschenberger ran for the Missouri Senate and lost to Dr. Bob Onder in the Republican primary.

== Personal life ==
Chuck Gatschenberger was born and raised in Springfield, Illinois. After attending Southeast High School and St. James High School he earned a bachelor's degree from the University of Missouri-St. Louis. He is divorced from his wife Donnette and they have three children. When not occupied with his legislative duties Representative Gatschenberger lives in Lake St. Louis where he works as a financial planner. Prior to politics he served as Director of Academic Advising for the University of Missouri-St. Louis. Gatschenberger is currently pursuing a master's degree from that institution. He is a member of the Wentzville and Lake St. Louis Chambers of Commerce, Wentzville Rotary, and National Rifle Association. He attends Calvary West Church in Wentzville. Although he is not a Catholic, he is a member of the Knights of Columbus.

== Politics ==
Gatschenberger first ran for the District 13 seat in 2006 but lost in the Republican primary, placing a distant second to Dr. Bob Onder. With Onder running for U.S. Congress in 2008, Gatshenberger was more successful on his second attempt, handily defeating fellow Republican Kevin Kuhlmann in the August primary and Democrat David Hurst in the general election. Gatschenberger defeated his Democratic challenger, former Wentzville Mayor Vickie Boedecker, in November 2010 to win his second term in Jefferson City.

=== Legislative assignments ===
- Chairman, Interim Committee on 911 Access
- Chairman, Local Government
- Ways and Means
- Appropriations – General Administration
- Downsizing State Government

== Electoral history ==
=== State representative ===
Missouri House of Representatives Primary Election, August 8, 2006, District 13
Party	Candidate	Votes	%	±%
Republican	Bob Onder	2,685	46.09%	
Republican	Chuck Gatschenberger	1,051	18.04%	
Republican	Paul Espinoza	1,039	17.84%	
Republican	Denise R. Hackman	723	12.41%	
Republican	Stephanie Bell	327	5.61%	

Missouri House of Representatives Primary Election, August 5, 2008, District 13
Party	Candidate	Votes	%	±%
Republican	Chuck Gatschenberger	2,687	63.49%	+45.45
Republican	Kevin Kuhlmann	1,545	36.51%	

rl

Missouri 13th District State Representative Election 2008
Party	Candidate	Votes	%	±%
Republican	Chuck Gatschenberger	19,170	58.3	Winner
Democratic	David Hurst	13,703	41.7	

Missouri 13th District State Representative Election 2010
Party	Candidate	Votes	%	±%
Republican	Chuck Gatschenberger	16,214	67.7	Winner
Democratic	Vickie Boedecker	7,743	32.3	

=== State Senate ===
Missouri Senate Election Primary, August 5, 2014, District 2
Party	Candidate	Votes	%	±%
Republican	Bob Onder	14,305	63.57%	
Republican	Vicki Schneider	4,561	20.27%	
Republican	Chuck Gatschenberger	3,635	16.16%	
