= Justin Hill (politician) =

American businessman and politician

Member of the Missouri House of Representatives from the 108th district
- In office 2015–2022
- Preceded by: Chuck Gatschenberger
- Succeeded by: Justin Hicks

Personal details
- Born: Kirkwood, Missouri, U.S.
- Party: Republican
- Children: 4
- Education: Bellevue University (BS); Liberty University (MPA)

Justin S. Hill is an American businessman and politician from the state of Missouri. A Republican, Hill was first elected to the Missouri House of Representatives from Missouri's 108th District in November 2014 and served until his resignation in January 2022. He represented a portion of St. Charles County in the Lake St. Louis area, south of I-70 and straddling U.S. Route 40/61. Hill previously served in the O'Fallon Police Department.

After Joe Biden won the 2020 presidential election and Donald Trump refused to concede while making false claims of fraud, Hill sponsored a declarative resolution in the Missouri House of Representatives to say that Missouri's lawmakers "have no faith in the validity" of the results of the 2020 presidential election. On January 6, 2021, Hill skipped his own inauguration to attend a rally at which President Trump gave a speech.

Of his presence near the Capitol after the Save America rally, he said, "I wasn't close enough to see anything. I didn't see any vandalism." He said the crowds at the rally and at the Capitol were "different people". Hill said he was disappointed with the way things worked out, adding, "It's such a sad day."

In 2021, Hill supported Republican efforts in the Missouri legislature to not implement Medicaid expansion, even though Missouri voters voted for it in a referendum. Hill said, "Even though my constituents voted for this lie, I am going to protect them from this lie."

On January 3, 2022, Hill announced his resignation from the Missouri House effective January 5. Media reports noted its being a day short of the anniversary of the U.S. Capitol attack. Hill said he would be moving to Florida, for business reasons.

On Hill's final day as a representative, he criticized several situations he considered wrong, including the state's initiative petition process, saying "The people are always going to vote for things that are going to sound good."

== Election results ==
Missouri House of Representatives — District 108 — St. Charles County (2020)
Party	Candidate	Votes	%	±%
Republican	Justin Hill	15,209	64.71%	+3.28
Democratic	Susan Shumway	8,296	35.29%	−3.28

Missouri House of Representatives — District 108 — St. Charles County (2018)
Party	Candidate	Votes	%	±%
Republican	Justin Hill	11,097	61.43%	−6.74
Democratic	Betty Vining	6,967	38.57%	+6.74

Missouri House of Representatives — District 108 — St. Charles County (2016)
Party	Candidate	Votes	%	±%
Republican	Justin Hill	14,271	68.17%	−4.56
Democratic	Ed Shew	6,663	31.83%	+4.56

Missouri House of Representatives — District 108 — St. Charles County (2014)
Party	Candidate	Votes	%	±%
Republican	Justin Hill	7,402	72.73%	−27.27
Democratic	Marlon Williams	2,775	27.27%	+27.27
