= Justin Hill =

Justin Hill may refer to:

- Justin Hill (writer) (born 1971), English novelist
- Justin Hill (politician), American businessman and politician
- Justin Hill (baseball), American college baseball coach
- Justin Hill (basketball) (born 2001), American college basketball player
- Justin Hall (American football) (born 1999), American football player
- Justin Hill (motorcyclist), American motorcyclist

== See also ==
- Justin Hills, bassist
