= Justin Hicks =

Justin Hicks may refer to:

- Justin Hicks (golfer), American professional golfer
- Justin Hicks (politician), American politician in Missouri
