= Missouri's 2nd Senate district =

American legislative district

Missouri's 2nd State Senate district
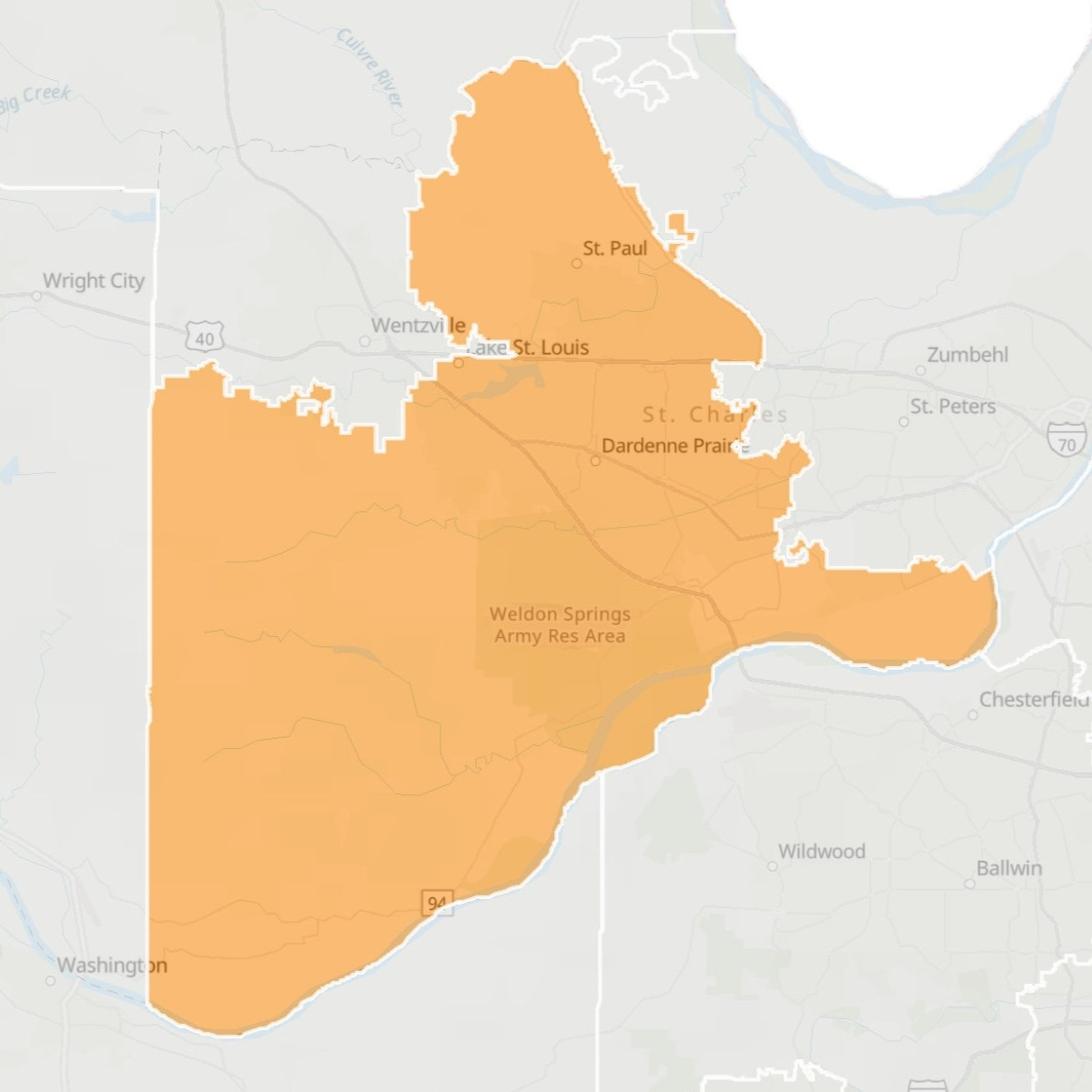
Senator
Nick Schroer; R–Defiance
- Demographics: 85% White; 4% Black; 4% Hispanic; 3% Asian; 4% Multiracial
- Population (2023): 179,253

Missouri's 2nd Senatorial District is one of 34 districts in the Missouri Senate. The district has been represented by Republican Nick Schroer since 2023.

== Geography ==
The district is based in south-central St. Charles County, falling within the northwestern side of the St. Louis metropolitan area. Major municipalities in the district include Cottleville, O'Fallon, and Lake St. Louis. The district is also home to the historic Daniel Boone Home.

== 2026 candidates ==
=== Republican primary ===
- Nick Schroer, incumbent senator

=== Democratic primary ===
- Susan Shumway, chaplain

== Election results (1998–2022) ==
=== 1998 ===
Missouri's 2nd Senatorial District election (1998)
Party	Candidate	Votes	%
Democratic	Ted House	33,709	67.0
Republican	Martin J. Struckhoff	16,586	33.0
Total votes		50,295	100.0

=== 2002 ===
Missouri's 2nd Senatorial District election (2002)
Party	Candidate	Votes	%
Republican	Jon Dolan	35,523	59.0
Democratic	Edward L. Schieffer	24,694	41.0
Total votes		60,217	100.0
Republican gain from Democratic			

=== 2006 ===
Missouri's 2nd Senatorial District election (2006)
Party	Candidate	Votes	%
Republican	Scott T. Rupp	44,785	54.3
Democratic	Wayne J. Henke	37,650	45.7
Total votes		82,435	100.0
Republican hold			

=== 2010 ===
Missouri's 2nd Senatorial District election (2010)
Party	Candidate	Votes	%
Republican	Scott T. Rupp (incumbent)	57,542	71.2
Democratic	Don Crozier	23,331	28.8
Total votes		80,873	100.0
Republican hold			

=== 2014 ===
Missouri's 2nd Senatorial District election (2014)
Party	Candidate	Votes	%
Republican	Bob Onder	37,607	100.0
Total votes		37,607	100.0
Republican hold			

=== 2018 ===
Missouri's 2nd Senatorial District election (2018)
Party	Candidate	Votes	%
Republican	Bob Onder (incumbent)	52,197	59.7
Democratic	Patrice Billings	35,258	40.3
Total votes		87,455	100.0
Republican hold			

=== 2022 ===
Missouri's 2nd Senatorial District election (2022)
Party	Candidate	Votes	%
Republican	Nick Schroer	42,568	63.0
Democratic	Michael Sinclair	24,998	37.0
Total votes		67,566	100.0
Republican hold			

== Statewide election results ==
Year	Office	Results
2008	President	McCain 57.3 – 41.6%
2012	President	Romney 63.9 – 36.1%
2016	President	Trump 63.5 – 31.7%
2016	Senate	Blunt 55.0 – 41.2%
2016	Governor	Greitens 57.5 – 39.9%
2018	Senate	Hawley 56.3 – 41.1%
2020	President	Trump 60.9 – 37.5%
2020	Governor	Parson 61.3 – 36.9%
