= Mark Matthiesen =

American politician from Missouri

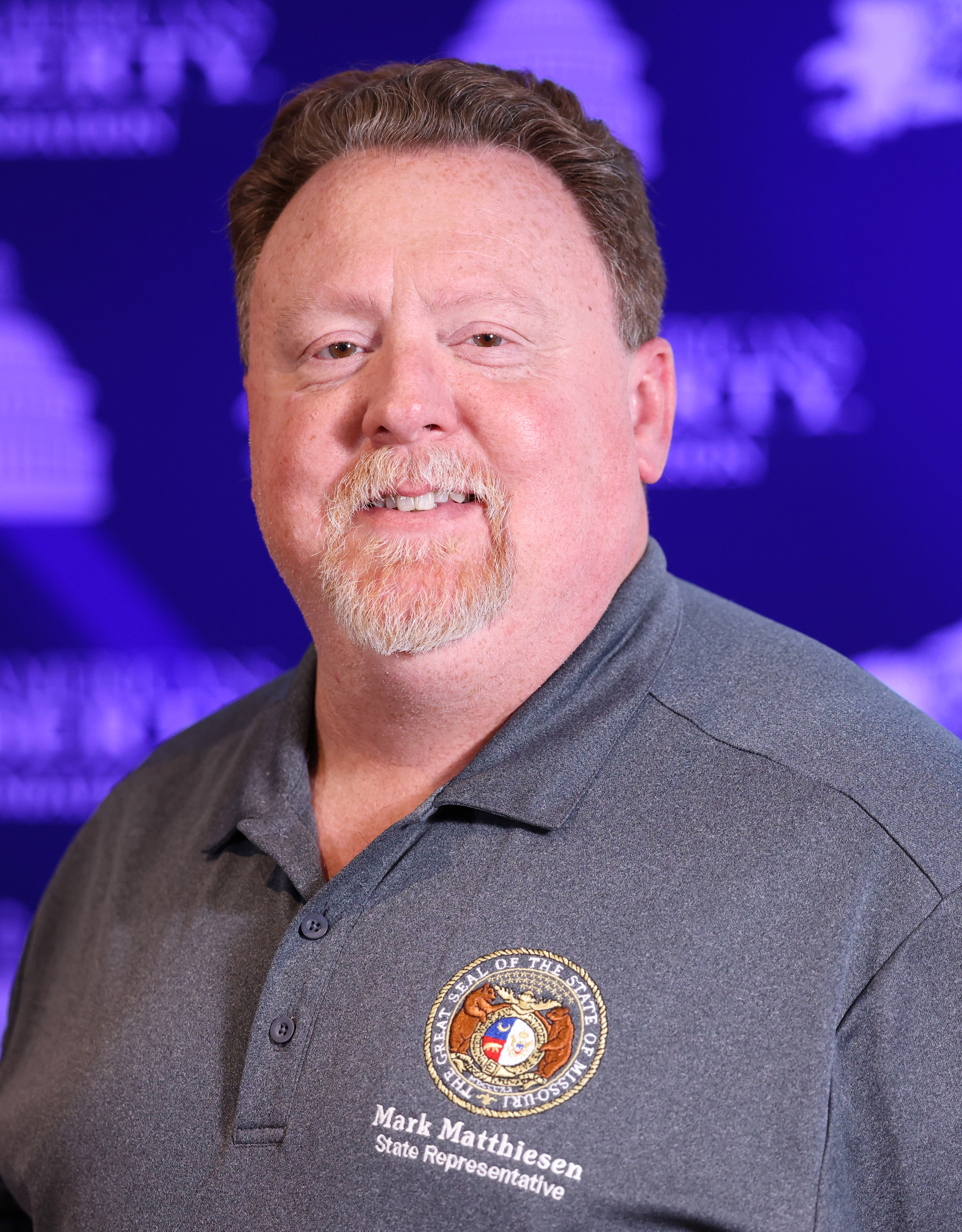
- Matthiesen at the 2024 Hazlitt Summit hosted by Young Americans for Liberty Foundation

Member of the Missouri House of Representatives from the 107th district
- Incumbent
- Assumed office January 2023
- Preceded by: Nick Schroer

Member of the Missouri House of Representatives from the 70th district
- In office January 2017 – January 2019
- Preceded by: Bill Otto
- Succeeded by: Paula Brown

Personal details
- Born: Fayetteville, Arkansas, U.S.
- Party: Republican
- Children: 1
- Education: Missouri State University

Mark Matthiesen is an American politician from the state of Missouri. A Republican, he was elected in November 2016 from the 70th district of the Missouri House of Representatives, served from January 2017 to January 2019, then was elected in November 2022 from the 107th district.

== Early life and career ==
Matthiesen was born in Fayetteville, Arkansas. He graduated from Washington High School in Washington, Missouri, in 1994. Additional education resulted in an associate degree in accounting from Florida State College at Jacksonville in 1999 and a bachelor's degree in hospitality management from Missouri State University in 2005. He is a licensed real estate agent, and in response to a 2022 candidate survey said he had worked in the hospitality industry for 20 years.

== Missouri House of Representatives ==
The 70th district that Matthiesen represented from 2017 included parts of Saint Charles and Saint Louis counties, spanning between Chesterfield and Florissant. In 2018, Matthiesen lost re-election to Democratic candidate Paula Brown by less than a one percent margin and only 111 votes, with nearly 200 votes going to a third-party candidate. In 2022, he was elected from another St. Charles county district that includes much of the city of O'Fallon. He was unopposed in the 2024 Republican primary.

== Election results ==
2022 Missouri House of Representatives — District 107
Party	Candidate	Votes	%	±%
Republican	Mark Matthiesen	8,151	59.94%	+10.89
Democratic	Tracy Grundy	5,447	40.06%	−9.68

2018 Missouri House of Representatives — District 70 — parts of St. Charles and St. Louis Counties
Party	Candidate	Votes	%	±%
Democratic	Paula Brown	7,993	49.74%	+2.65
Republican	Mark Matthiesen	7,882	49.05%	−3.86
Green	Carol Hexem	195	1.21%	

2016 Missouri House of Representatives — District 70 — parts of St. Charles and St. Louis Counties
Party	Candidate	Votes	%	±%
Republican	Mark Matthiesen	9,491	52.91%	
Democratic	Byron DeLear	8,447	47.09%	

== Personal life ==
In 2026, Matthiesen's wife and son moved to Thailand. Matthiesen plans to stay behind to serve in his Missouri house seat, and spend several weeks a year visiting Thailand.
