= Powder puff =

Face powder applicator

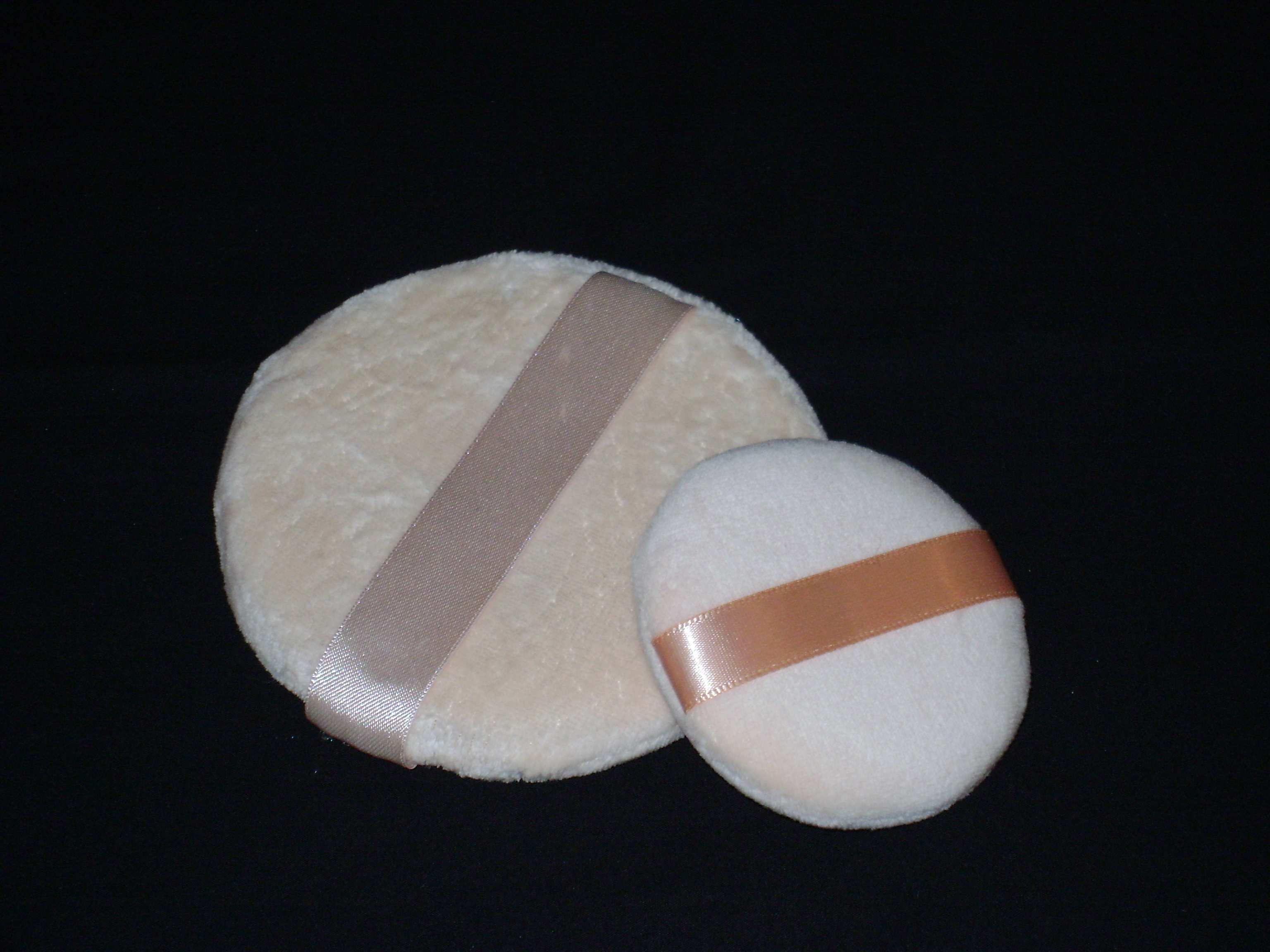
Powder puffs

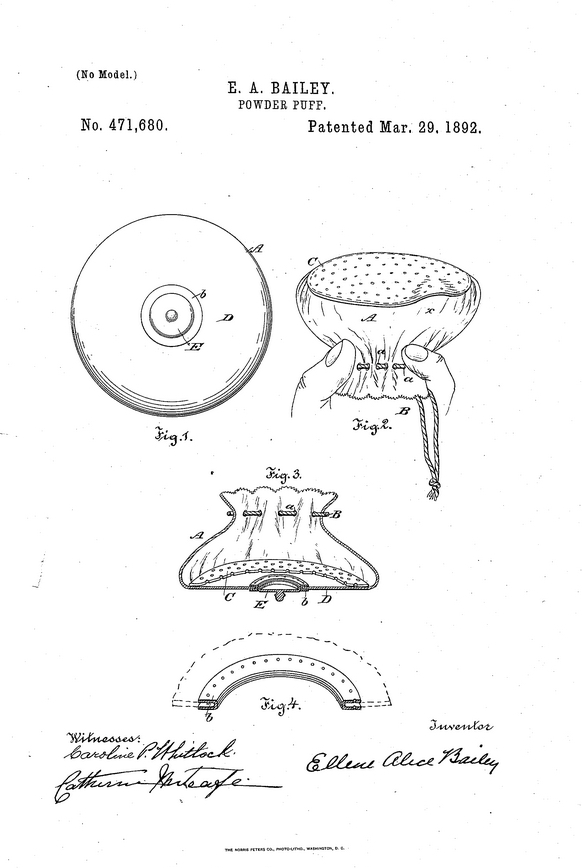
Ellene Alice Bailey powder puff design, U.S. patent no. 471,680, 1892.

Powder puffs are pieces of soft material used for the application of face powder. They may be shaped as balls or pads.

Historically, powder puffs have been made of very fine down feathers, cotton, fine fleece, etc. In modern times synthetic materials are widely used for powder puffs.

In addition to softness, an important characteristic of powder puffs is their intake ability, i.e., the ability to hold powder. It was reported that for synthetic fibers important factors in designing high-intake powder puffs are mostly geometric ones: fiber diameter, pile length, and space between fibers, with little dependence on material factors.

Powder puffs have been used as a stereotype image for soft, careless femininity, as seen, e.g., in the term "powderpuff sports", including collegiate sorority flag football leagues. The name of the Powerpuff Girls is a pun on "powder puff".

Ellene Alice Bailey may have been the first American to patent a powder puff with her 1882 invention of a small drawstring cloth bag with a perforated bottom to distribute the powder evenly. She went on to invent three more variations on her powder puff, the last of them patented in 1892, and has been described as "America’s powder puff pioneer".
