= Nick Schroer =

American politician

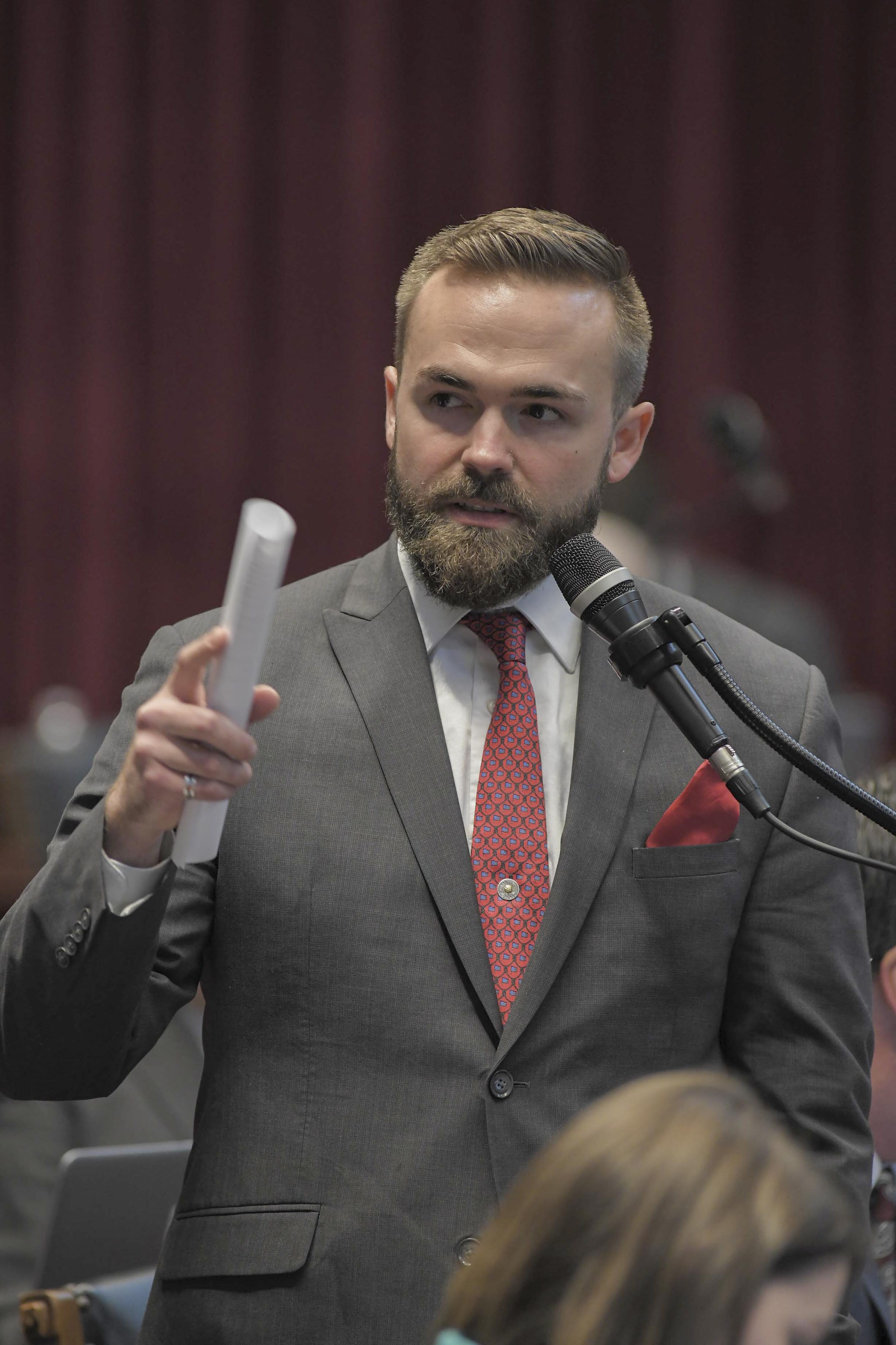
- Representative Nick Schroer debating legislation in 2018

Member of the Missouri Senate from the 2nd district
- Incumbent
- Assumed office January 4, 2023
- Preceded by: Bob Onder

Member of the Missouri House of Representatives from the 107th district
- In office January 4, 2017 – January 4, 2023
- Preceded by: Ron Hicks
- Succeeded by: Mark Matthiesen (redistricting)

Personal details
- Born: Ferguson, Missouri
- Party: Republican
- Profession: Attorney

Nick Schroer is an American politician. He is a member of the Missouri Senate from the 2nd district, serving since 2023. He previously represented the 107th district in the Missouri House of Representatives from 2017 to 2023. He is a member of the Republican Party.

== Issues ==
=== Abortion ===
In 2019, Schroer sponsored legislation to ban abortions eight weeks into a pregnancy. The legislation would also prevent women from having abortions if the fetus is diagnosed with Down syndrome.

=== COVID-19 ===
In 2022, Schroer opposed the Biden administration's COVID-19 vaccine requirements for health care workers.

=== Discrimination ===
In 2025, Schroer carried legislation to void non-discrimination ordinances for Section 8 tenants passed in several Missouri cities.

=== Education ===
In 2023, Schroer authored legislation which prevents public schools from teaching critical race theory and which requires schools to provide parents curriculum materials for their children. In 2024, Schroer sponsored the amendment to ensure that the locker rooms and restrooms students use matches their biological sex.

== Defamation lawsuit ==
In April 2024, Schroer was sued, along with two other Missouri state senators, for false light by Denton Loudermill of Olathe, Kansas, after Schroer shared a tweet by Congressman Tim Burchett that displayed an image on social media of a man in handcuffs, with a claim that one of the shooters was an undocumented immigrant at the 2024 Kansas City parade shooting, along with a question whether the claim had been confirmed or debunked by local law enforcement. That case was dismissed after the Court granted Senator Schroer's Motion to Dismiss

== Election results ==
=== Missouri House of Representatives ===
Missouri House of Representatives – District 107 – St. Charles County (2020)
Party	Candidate	Votes	%	±%
Republican	Nick Schroer	12,344	59.72	+0.64
Democratic	Victoria Witt Datt	7,554	36.54	−4.38
Libertarian	Mike Copeland	773	3.74	+3.74
Total votes		20,671	100.00	

Missouri House of Representatives – District 107 – St. Charles County (2018)
Party	Candidate	Votes	%	±%
Republican	Nick Schroer	9,759	59.08	−5.04
Democratic	Curtis Wylde	6,758	40.92	+5.03
Total votes		16,517	100.00	

Missouri House of Representatives – District 107 – St. Charles County (2016)
Party	Candidate	Votes	%	±%
Republican	Nick Schroer	12,200	64.12	−35.88
Democratic	Curtis Wylde	6,826	35.88	+35.88
Total votes		19,026	100.00	

=== Missouri Senate ===
Missouri Senate – District 2 – Republican Primary (August 2, 2022)
Party	Candidate	Votes	%	±%
Republican	Nick Schroer	12,047	57.60%	n/a
Republican	John Wiemann	8,868	42.40%	n/a

Missouri Senate – District 2 – General Election (November 8, 2022)
Party	Candidate	Votes	%	±%
Republican	Nick Schroer	42,568	63.00%	n/a
Democratic	Michael Sinclair	24,998	37.00%	n/a
