= Wentzville Tobacco Company Factory =

- U.S. National Register of Historic Places
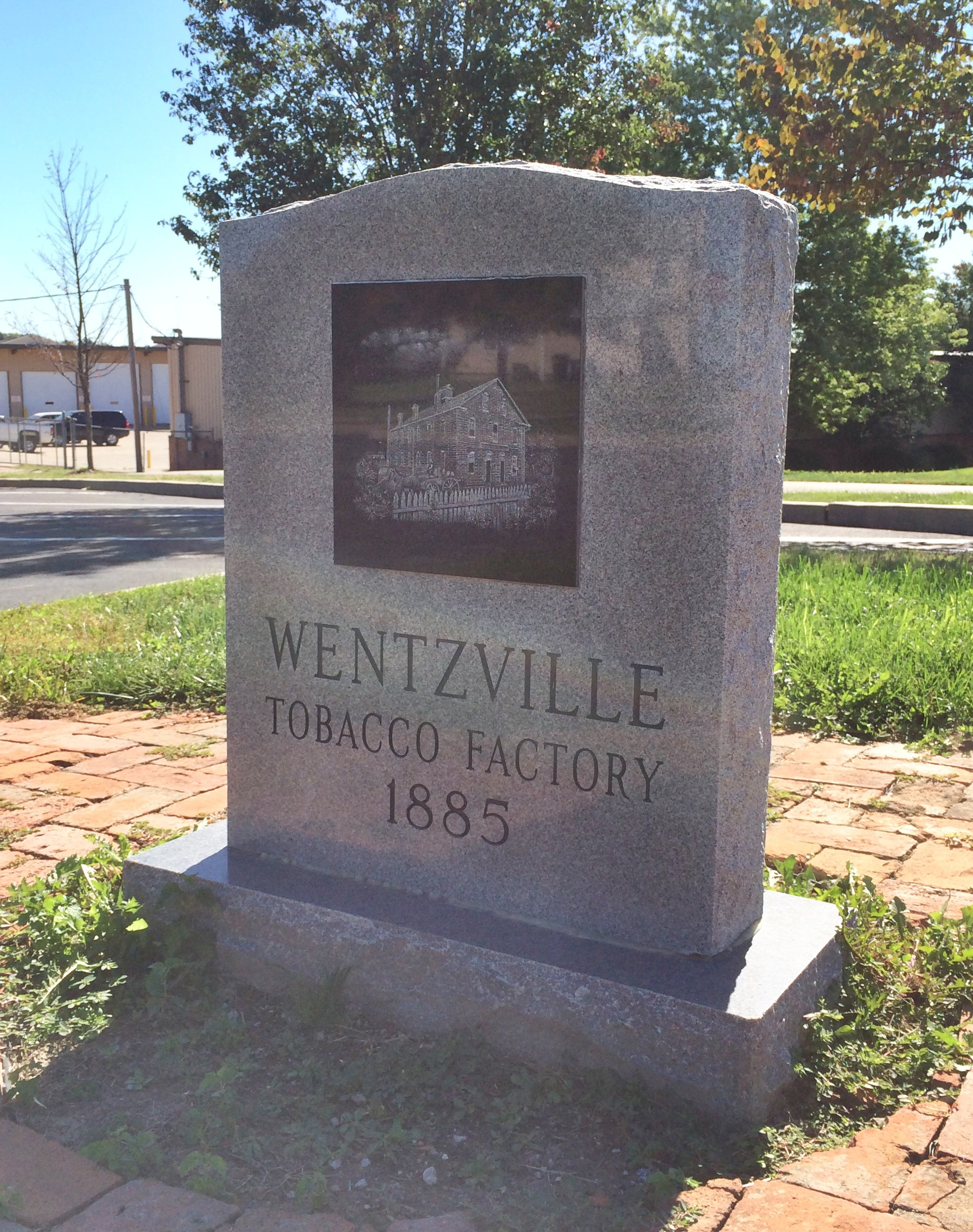
- Wentzville Tobacco Company Factory Monument, September 2014

- Location within Missouri Location within the United States
- Location: 406 Elm St., Wentzville, Missouri
- Coordinates: 38°48′37″N 90°51′5″W
- Area: less than one acre
- Built: 1885
- NRHP reference No.: 90001024
- Added to NRHP: July 5, 1990

Wentzville Tobacco Company Factory was a historic tobacco factory located at Wentzville, St. Charles County, Missouri. It was built in 1885, and was a 2 1/2-story, three bay by six bay brick building with timber framing. It measured approximately 40 feet by 90 feet and had a gable roof with long shed dormers.

Despite being listed on the National Register of Historic Places in 1990, the historic building was demolished in 2002 and replaced with a parking lot. A historic marker was placed next to the parking lot on the site of the former building.
