= Midwest University =

Christian university in Wentzville, Missouri, United States

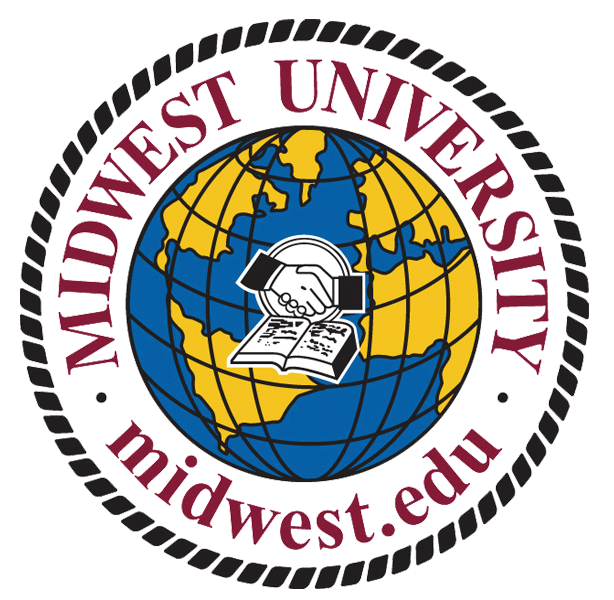
- Type: Private university
- Established: 1986
- Accreditation: ABHE
- Affiliations: Federation of Christian Schools in Korea (FCSK); International Evangelical Association (IEA)
- President: James Song
- Location: Wentzville, Missouri, United States; 38°50′00″N 90°49′58″W
- Website: www.midwest.edu

Midwest University is a private Evangelical Christian university in Wentzville, Missouri. Founded in 1986 by James Song as the Midwest College and Theological Seminary, the school aspires to provide biblically-based higher education to its students. Described by the St. Louis Post-Dispatch in 2000 as a “Korean seminary” with students from more than sixty countries, Midwest has sought to expand its local student population.

Midwest University now offers bachelor's, master's, and doctoral degrees through face-to-face, online, and distance education. In addition to its 17-acre (6.9 ha) residential campus, the university operates a business incubation center in Jefferson City, Missouri, a teaching site near Washington, D.C., and an international site at the Korea Christian Building in Seoul, South Korea.

== Academics ==
Midwest University is organized into five colleges: the College of International Aviation, the College of International Business/Leadership, the College of Music, the College of Education, and the College of Theology/Graduate School of Theology. Together, the university's colleges offer four undergraduate majors, including traditional and adult degree completion programs. They also offer ten graduate degree programs and two certificate programs.

Courses are offered primarily in the Korean language, and also in English. The university library has a multilingual collection with many library materials are available in both Korean and English.

According to the school, its 2017–2018 undergraduate graduation rate is 42%, and its undergraduate retention rate is 94%. Also according to the school, the job placement rate for students completing undergraduate and graduate programs is 97.6%.

=== Accreditation ===
In September 2000, the university's undergraduate programs were accredited by the Transnational Association of Christian Colleges and Schools (TRACS). Beginning in November 2004, its graduate programs were also accredited by TRACS. Midwest withdrew from TRACS in October 2010. According to the U.S. Department of Education the school was unaccredited from 2010 to 2013.

In August 2007, Korea JoongAng Daily described Midwest University one of several "diploma mills, unaccredited institutions that issue questionable academic degrees”, stating that it had issued 39 "fake degrees" since January 2003., though the University has since been accredited.

In November 2011, Midwest was granted applicant status by nationally recognized accrediting organization Association for Biblical Higher Education (ABHE). It was preaccredited in February 2013, and since February 2015, Midwest is accredited by ABHE. The university's Graduate School of Theology is an associate member of, but is not accredited by nor a candidate for accreditation with, the Association of Theological Schools in the United States and Canada.

== Midwest International Research Institute ==
The school's Midwest International Research Institute in Jefferson City, Missouri, is a "business incubation center", providing job training, skills development, and English-language courses. Students come from South Korea, as well as other places in Asia, for between six months and two years.

== Notable faculty ==
- Deborah Fikes, member of the board of directors of the Arms Control Association
