= Paula Brown (politician) =

American politician

Member of the Missouri House of Representatives from the 70th, 87th district
- In office January 2019 – January 2025
- Preceded by: Mark Matthiesen
- Succeeded by: Connie Steinmetz

Personal details
- Party: Democratic
- Children: 2
- Education: University of Missouri Lindenwood University

Paula Brown is an American politician. She was a Democratic member of the Missouri House of Representatives. Her first election to the house was in 2018, from district 70, and after redistricting in 2022, she was reelected from district 87. She is a retired school teacher from the Hazelwood School District. She is a member of North County Labor, West County Democrats, Chesterfield Democrats and MNEA Retired.

== Education ==
Brown earned a bachelor’s degree in Elementary Education from the University of Missouri and a master's degree in Education from Lindenwood University.

== Electoral history ==
Missouri House of Representatives Primary Election, August 7, 2018, District 70
Party	Candidate	Votes	%	±%
Democratic	Paula Brown	3,057	64.71%	
Democratic	Gregory Upchurch	1,055	22.33%	
Democratic	Donald Klein	612	12.96%	
Total votes		4,724	100.00%	

General election for Missouri House of Representatives – District 70 (2018)
Party	Candidate	Votes	%	±%
Democratic	Paula Brown	7,993	49.74%	
Republican	Mark Matthiesen	7,882	49.05%	
Green	Carol Hexem	195	1.21%	
Total votes		16,070	100.00%	

General election for Missouri House of Representatives – District 70 (2020)
Party	Candidate	Votes	%	
Democratic	Paula Brown	10,275	53.99%	+4.25
Republican	Jerry Adzima	8,755	46.01%	−3.04
Total votes		19,030	100.00%	

Missouri House of Representatives Election, November 8, 2022, District 87
Party	Candidate	Votes	%	±%
Democratic	Paula Brown	8,707	100.00%	+46.01
Total votes		8,707	100.00%	
