= Justin Hicks (politician) =

American politician

Member of the Missouri House of Representatives from the 108th district
- In office January 4, 2023 – January 8, 2025
- Preceded by: Justin Hill
- Succeeded by: Mike Costlow

Personal details
- Party: Republican
- Children: 1
- Education: SUNY Empire State College (BS); St. Louis University School of Law (JD)

Justin Hicks is an American politician and lawyer who served as a member of the Missouri House of Representatives from 2023 to 2025, representing the 108th district. Elected in November 2022, he assumed office on January 4, 2023. Hicks began a 2024 campaign to represent Missouri's 3rd congressional district, though suspended his run after a competitor was endorsed by then-former president Donald Trump.

== Early life and education ==
Hicks was born in St. Louis County, Missouri, and is a graduate of Ritenour High School. He earned a B.S. from SUNY Empire State College and a J.D. from St. Louis University School of Law.

== Career ==
Hicks served in the United States Army from 2011 to 2017. Thereafter, he worked as an assistant attorney general in the Missouri Attorney General's Office. In November 2022, Hicks was elected to the Missouri House of Representatives from the 108th district.

In 2023, Hicks was rewarded freshman legislator of the year by Missouri House Speaker Dean Plocher, and supported legislation to appoint special prosecutors in municipalities and to allow charter schools in St. Charles County. He established a new law through an amendment on a larger bill that barred public view to identifiable details in court records, a move criticized by a challenger to the Missouri House seat who published documents allegedly from a 2010 protection order against Hicks. Portions of the law were ruled unconstitutional, in violation of the First and Fourteenth Amendments to the U.S. Constitution, and a section of the Constitution of Missouri.

In 2024, Hicks suspended his campaign to represent Missouri's 3rd congressional district following Trump's endorsement of Bob Onder.

== Personal life ==
Hicks lives in Lake St. Louis with his wife and daughter.

== Electoral history ==
Missouri House of Representatives Election November 8, 2022, District 108
Party	Candidate	Votes	%	±%
Republican	Justin Hicks	8,895	63.9%	
Democratic	Susan Shumway	5,028	36.1%	
Total votes		13,923	100.00%	
