= Ellene Alice Bailey =

19th-century American designer and inventor

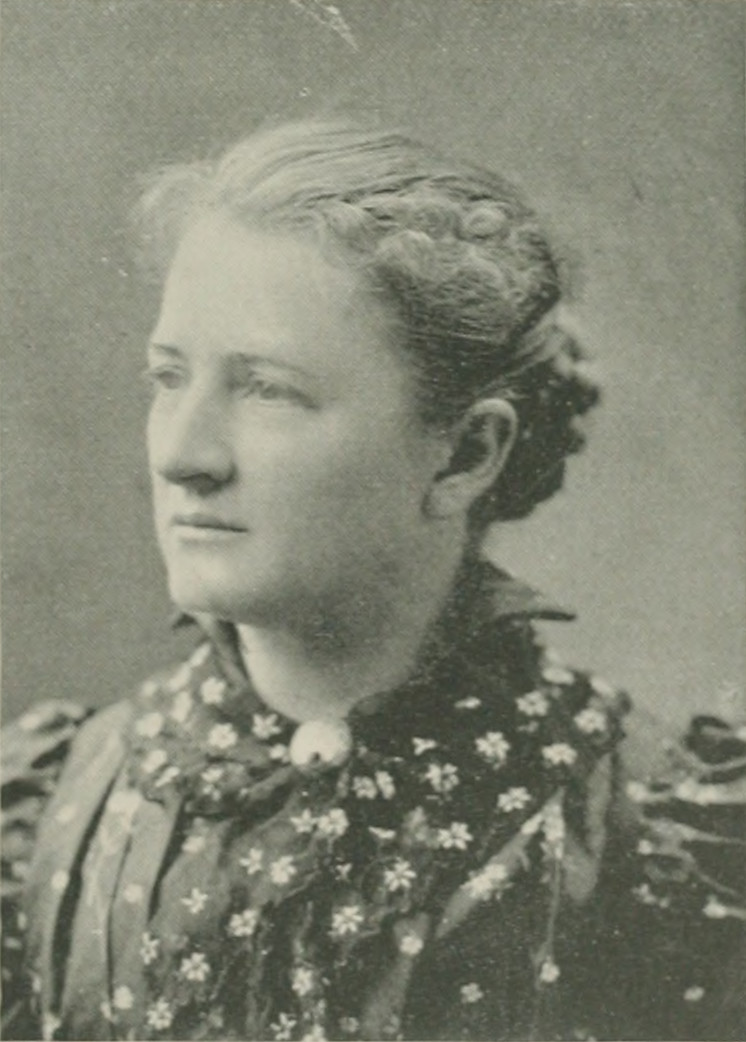
Ellene Alice Bailey, ca. 1893

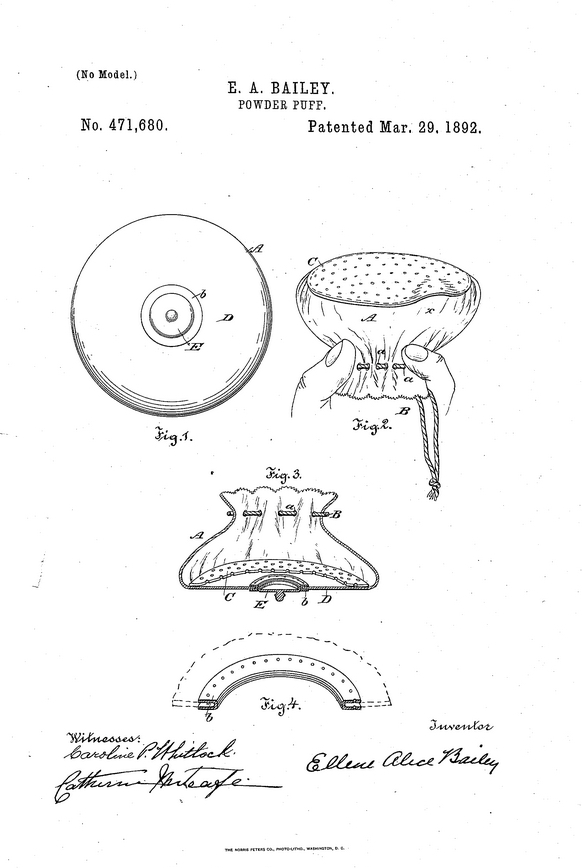
E.A. Bailey powder puff design, U.S. patent no. 471,680, 1892.

Ellene Alice Bailey (1853 – July 22, 1897) was an American designer and inventor specializing in clothing and household goods. She patented over a dozen of her many inventions.

== Biography ==
Ellene Alice Bailey was born in Pond Fort, just south of Wentzville, Missouri, the third daughter of Robert Bailey, a judge, and Lucinda (Zumwalt) Bailey. Early in her career, she moved to New York and built a business from manufacturing her own designs or selling them for outside manufacture.

Bailey became a designer of clothing and household goods, as well as an inventor of practical devices. Her first design was the "Pond Fort boot", a close-fitting, knee-high boot that she patented in both the United States and Canada in 1880. Later clothing designs included a perforated felt chest protector, a sleeve holder, a waterproof leg protector, a detachable brassiere frame, and a corset shield.

One of her early inventions was the "Dart" needle, first patented in 1884. She initially manufactured the Dart needle herself, making the first 60,000 on her own after the man she hired for the job absconded. She later had the needle manufactured by an outside firm. Other practical objects for the home included a holder for rubber overshoes, a manicure case, a photograph album, several clocks, ornamental tables, and a hand pinking device. A number of Bailey's inventions were novelty or seasonal goods, such as a silver whisk broom and a music roll sold as a Christmas card. On occasion, she improved designs originated by other inventors to make them salable.

Bailey may have been the first American to patent a powder puff with her 1882 invention of a small drawstring cloth bag with a perforated bottom to distribute the powder evenly. She went on to invent three more variations on her powder puff, the last of them patented in 1892, and has been described as "America’s powder puff pioneer".
