= Southern Air Restaurant =

Former restaurant in Wentzville, Missouri

Coordinates: 38.811594°N 90.842692°W

The Southern Air was a restaurant located in Wentzville, Missouri. The building no longer operates as a restaurant, but it now houses a satellite campus of Lindenwood University.

== History ==
The Southern Air was built at the crossroads of U.S. Highways 40 and 61, long before Interstates 64 and 70 were constructed. The Southern Air opened in 1937, and it originally included both a cafe and a service station for automobiles.

According to the Wentzville Historical Society archives, it was built and operated by Joe Harlan in 1937; he later leased it to Mr. and Mrs. Russel Lewis until 1941, when Bob Robertson took over operations. In 1962 Robertson purchased the property including the service station. In September 1967, Robertson, because of health problems, sold the Southern Air to Edward Fries.

== Chuck Berry ownership ==
In the 1980s, rock and roll pioneer Chuck Berry purchased the Southern Air.

In December 1989, a former cook at the restaurant, Hosana A. Huck, filed a lawsuit against Berry. The lawsuit alleged that Huck, along with other employees and customers, were videotaped, causing distress and humiliation. The lawsuit alleged that the video tapes "were created for the improper purpose of entertainment and gratification" of Berry's "sexual fetishes and sexual predilections." In May 1990, a class-action lawsuit was filed against Berry on behalf of 200 other women.

== Lindenwood University ownership ==
Lindenwood University purchased the Southern Air building from Chuck Berry in 1999. Lindenwood University president Dennis Spellman was credited with saving the building. He felt it was important to preserve the historic link to the past, and Lindenwood agreed to leave the Southern Air sign up so that it would be recognized for its historical value. After James D. Evans became president of Lindenwood (2007), Lindenwood requested the Southern Air sign be replaced with a Lindenwood University sign in 2010. This request was made in an effort to attract more students to the satellite campus in Wentzville. The City of Wentzville agreed to allow the change, and the historic Southern Air sign was removed from the building.
