= Jonathan Dolan =

American politician

Jonathan 'Jon' Dolan (born March 16, 1967) is a trade association executive and former Missouri legislator who served in the Missouri Senate from 2003 to 2005 and served in the Missouri House of Representatives from 1997 to 2003.

== Biography ==
Dolan was raised in Pearl River, NY, a suburb of New York City. In 1983, he moved with his family to Lake St. Louis, MO. A 1985 graduate of St. Dominic High School in O'Fallon, MO, he attended the University of Missouri where he was commissioned a U.S. Army Reserve Officer in May 1988 and received a Bachelor of Arts in Political Science with a Minor in Military Science in December 1988. He received his Master of Arts in Security Management from Webster University in St. Louis, MO in 1995.

His early career comprises nine years in the security management field. First, in retail security management, then as a Special Agent in the Office of Security at the Central Intelligence Agency and later working in the private sector as a security systems sales and design consultant. Dolan’s military training includes the Military Police Captain's Career Course, the Public Affairs Officer Course and the US Army Airborne School.

Elected to 13th District of the Missouri House of Representatives in 1996, 1998, 2000, he served three terms and was elected to the 2nd District of the Missouri Senate in 2002 representing West St. Charles and Lincoln County. He served as the Majority Caucus Chairman and was Chairman of the Senate Transportation Committee where he led the effort to improve the safety and accountability of Missouri’s statewide transportation system. Dolan was involved in a variety of issues such as highway safety and reform initiatives, veteran’s affairs, health care, criminal law and debate and passage of the Missouri Military Funeral Honors program (1998), the Nursing Home Reform Act (2003) and a resolution supporting Operation Iraqi Freedom (2003).

In November 2005, Dolan was hired as Executive Director of the Missouri Health Care Association (MHCA), an affiliate of the American Health Care Association (AHCA) representing many of Missouri’s nursing homes and assisted living facilities. Over his tenure, the association maintained and improved its affiliation with AHCA, increased membership, expanded contract programs and secured eight Medicaid Rate increases for Skilled Nursing Facilities as well as other budget, policy and regulatory initiatives.

In February 2014, Dolan became the President & CEO of the Health Care Association of New Jersey (HCANJ). Over his tenure, the association increased its membership, improved the number of national quality awards received by its member facilities, enhanced its government affairs posture and also developed a strategy addressing New Jersey's transition to Managed Long Term Services and Supports (MLTSS), while also successfully advocating for multiple Medicaid reimbursement increases and reforming the Medicaid eligibility and certification process.

He is married to Leanne Dolan and they have two children.
