= Wentzville R-IV School District =

School district in Missouri, U.S.

Address
- 280 Interstate Drive Wentzville, Missouri, 63385; United States
- Coordinates: 38°48′02″N 90°49′46″W

District information
- Type: Public school district
- Motto: Learning Today, Leading Tomorrow
- Grades: Preschool through 12th grade
- Superintendent: Dr. Jeri LaBrot (Co-Interim) and Brian Bishop (Co-Interim)
- NCES District ID: 2931650

Students and staff
- Enrollment: 12,000+
- Staff: 1,235.88 (on an FTE basis)
- Student–teacher ratio: 14.08

Other information
- Website: www.wentzville.k12.mo.us

Wentzville R-IV School District is a school district headquartered in Wentzville, Missouri, United States. In addition to almost all of Wentzville, the district serves all of Lake St. Louis, the St. Charles County portion of Foristell; and portions of Dardenne Prairie, Flint Hill, Josephville, and O'Fallon.

== History ==
In 2022 the American Civil Liberties Union (ACLU) sued the district over the district's plan to no longer include eight books in the school's library. The school board had voted to remove The Bluest Eye by Toni Morrison with four in favor and three against. By February 2022 the board reversed its decision on The Bluest Eye.

== Schools ==
=== High schools ===
- Wentzville Holt High School
- Timberland High School
- Liberty High School
- North Point High School

=== Middle schools ===
- Frontier Middle
- South Middle
- Wentzville Middle
- North Point Middle

=== Elementary schools ===
- Boone Trail Elementary
- Crossroads Elementary
- Discovery Ridge Elementary
- Duello Elementary
- Green Tree Elementary
- Heritage Elementary
- Journey Elementary
- Lakeview Elementary
- Peine Ridge Elementary
- Prairie View Elementary
- Stone Creek Elementary
- Wabash Elementary

=== Early childhood ===
- Barfield Early Childhood Center

In early 2016, the district announced that during the 2017–18 school year they would move all 6th grade students from the middle schools to their respective elementary schools. This allowed more space for the Middle Schools to expand and be able to teach more subjects with more space and a smaller teacher to student ratio.
