= Deborah Fikes =

American activist

Deborah Fikes is a member of the Council on Foreign Relations and serves on the board of directors of the Arms Control Association. She is a co-president of Religions for Peace, the world’s largest and most representative multi-religious coalition, with offices in New York. Fikes serves as an executive advisor to the World Evangelical Alliance, which represents a constituency of 650 million with alliance offices in 129 countries, and was the WEA's permanent representative to the United Nations from 2009-2016. She served for three consecutive terms as a board member of the National Association of Evangelicals (NAE), which represents 45,000 churches in the United States.

== Peace-making Initiatives ==
Fikes served as the director the Midland, Texas, Ministerial Alliance during President George W. Bush's administrations and was actively involved with the Comprehensive Peace Agreement negotiations between North and South Sudan. She was personal friends with the late vice president John Garang and the CPA's lead negotiator, former Kenyan general Lazaro Sumbeiywo. She led a delegation of American religious leaders to Khartoum during the CPA negotiations to encourage ending the war between North and South Sudan and promote interfaith dialogue.

She is an executive board member of the International Center for Religion & Diplomacy. and has been involved with conflict resolution outreach initiatives in Africa and North Korea where she has traveled as an advisor to the Pyongyang University of Science and Technology. She serves as the U.S. chairman of the board for Ignis Community, a non-profit organization that does humanitarian work in North Korea and specializes in helping North Korean children with disabilities.

== Political life ==
Fikes has worked with conservatives in the Republican Party and was on former senator Sam Brownback’s exploratory committee when he ran for the GOP nomination in 2008. However, her concerns about the Republican Party’s tolerance of harsh rhetoric promoting ethnic and religious discrimination towards Muslims as well as her opposition to the divisive "America First" campaign has led to her support of the liberal Democratic Party. Fikes has called for protection of religious minorities through her ecumenical work, despite backlash from some conservative evangelicals.

Since the run-up to the 2016 election, Fikes has publicly urged fellow evangelicals to reconsider their alignment with the G.O.P., observing that the politicization of attitudes labeled in America as part of the “liberal agenda” (such as climate change, healthcare, gun control, and nuclear disarmament) are seen as pro-life and pro-family by evangelicals around the world. She offered her endorsement of Hillary Clinton, and has responded to common evangelical objections to traditionally Democratic viewpoints on topics like abortion, highlighting that one-third of all Democrats are personally pro-life, and that the Democratic Party’s approach to addressing the root issues of poverty and healthcare are more effective than policies of the current Republican Party Fikes continually beseeched evangelicals to stop perpetuating hateful rhetoric and was one of the few evangelical leaders to publicly support Clinton after Trump met with more than 900 prominent Christian conservatives during the 2016 campaign. Fikes has received mixed responses to her support of Clinton, from private applause and encouragement to spiteful messages of condemnation.

Fikes has also spoken up about intolerance toward religious minorities, opposing Donald Trump’s proposal for banning Muslims from entering the United States.

== Environmental Stewardship Initiatives ==
Fikes served from 2007-2018 on the Advisory Board of the Center for Health and the Global Environment at Harvard School of Public Health. Fikes participated in the Scientist-Evangelical Partnership the Harvard Center founded in 2005 and was part of the Alaska expedition featured on the NOW on PBS documentary, God and Global Warming.

Fikes has been an advocate for environmental stewardship and the promotion of sustainable energy as part of Creation Care Initiatives that the World Evangelical Alliance has supported. She has spoken at public events about “Greening the Golden Rule," sharing her observation that the topic of climate change has become politicized and controversial among U.S. evangelicals which is not the case among the greater evangelical global body. Fikes was included as one of the opening speakers for NYC Climate Week 2012 hosted by the Climate Group, a non-profit independent organization promoting economic growth though cleaner energy sources. She has served as an ambassador for the Clean Revolution, a partnership of international statesmen and governments, business leaders and corporations, thinkers and opinion formers coordinated by the Climate Group. Fikes supports clean energy as vital to advancing a holistic approach to addressing humanitarian needs in third world countries and mitigating conflict over competition for resources.

She has been a vocal advocate for supporting younger evangelical environmentalists who have not been embraced in their conservative faith traditions. She is a member of the Interfaith Moral Action on Climate Coalition and the National Climate Ethics Campaign Coalition Fikes also serves as an ambassador for Oxfam Sisters on the Planet, which raises awareness about hunger, poverty, and climate change, especially as they affect women worldwide.

== Education ==
Fikes holds an undergraduate degree from Texas A&M University in education, a master's degree in language arts from the University of Texas, and a master's degree in international law from Oxford University. She received an honorary doctorate and endowed chair professorship from Midwest University.
