= Fike =

Fike is a surname. Notable people with the surname include:

- A. J. Fike (born 1980), American racing driver
- Aaron Fike (born 1982), American racing driver
- Dan Fike (born 1961), American football player
- Edward Fike (1925–2018), American politician
- Dominic Fike (born 1995), American singer and rapper
