= Liberty High School (O'Fallon, Missouri) =

High school in O'Fallon, Missouri, US

Location
- 2275 Sommers Road; O'Fallon, Missouri 63367; United States; 38.7581°N 90.7868°W

Information
- Type: Public high school
- Motto: Be Responsible, Be Respectful, and act with Integrity
- Established: 2013; 13 years ago
- School district: Wentzville School District
- Superintendent: Brian Bishop
- Principal: Edgar Nelson
- Teaching staff: 92.09 (FTE)
- Grades: 9–12
- Enrollment: 1,652 (2024–25)
- Student to teacher ratio: 18.12
- Colors: Navy and scarlet
- Nickname: Eagles
- Newspaper: The Ledger
- Feeder schools: Wentzville Frontier Middle School
- Website: lhs.wentzville.k12.mo.us

Liberty High School is a public high school in O'Fallon, Missouri. It has a "Lake St. Louis, Missouri" postal address.

It is the third high school built in the Wentzville School District in Missouri, United States. The building opened for its first year in 2013. The enrollment for the first year was under 300 students, and consisted of a freshman class due to graduate in May 2017. Liberty has now grown to all grade levels.

== Academics ==
Liberty has an Academic Assist program after school for those struggling in classes. Students can get help from teachers with one-on-one assistance. Liberty also participates in the Missouri A+ program. Students who achieve the seven A+ state requirements are eligible for tuition reimbursement and general fee reimbursement to attend any community college or technical school in the state of Missouri. Liberty offers Advanced Placement (AP) courses that allow students an early glimpse of the college experience. The school also offers a range of elective classes, such as Industrial Technology, Family and Consumer Science classes, Fine Arts, and Project Lead the Way classes.

== Background ==
Liberty High School was established in 2013 as the Wentzville School District's third high school. The school's first principal, Phil Ragusky, had been the principal of the feeder school, Frontier Middle School.

During the 2013–14 school year, the school only consisted of freshmen. Each consecutive year another class has been added. The 2016–2017 school year was the first with all four classes present in the building.

For the 2015–16 school year, Liberty hired a new principal and assistant principal, Edgar Nelson and Steven Pryor. Nelson was previously an Assistant Principal at Holt High School, and now serves as Liberty's Head Principal. Pryor previously served as an Assistant Principal at Washington High School. For the 2016–2017 school year, Liberty and the Wentzville School District announced that teachers Lindsay Sutherlin and Matthew Keisel would become assistant principals.
