= Bob Onder =

American politician and physician (born 1962)

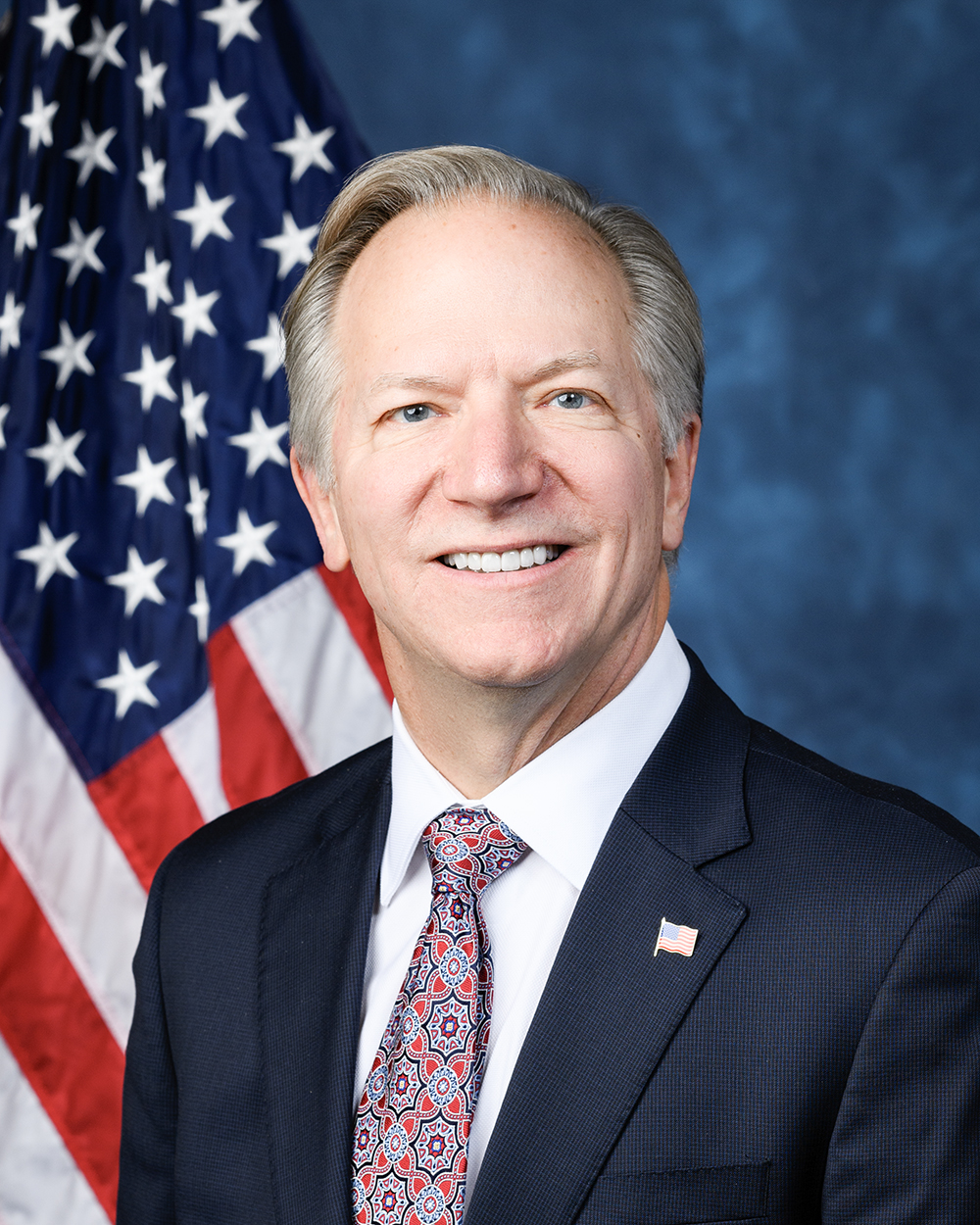
- Official portrait, 2024

Member of the U.S. House of Representatives from Missouri's 3rd district
- Incumbent
- Assumed office January 3, 2025
- Preceded by: Blaine Luetkemeyer

Member of the Missouri Senate from the 2nd district
- In office January 7, 2015 – January 4, 2023
- Preceded by: Scott T. Rupp
- Succeeded by: Nick Schroer

Member of the Missouri House of Representatives from the 13th district
- In office January 3, 2007 – January 7, 2009
- Preceded by: Scott T. Rupp
- Succeeded by: Chuck Gatschenberger

Personal details
- Born: Robert Frank Onder Jr. January 6, 1962 (age 64) St. Louis, Missouri, U.S.
- Party: Republican
- Spouse: Allison Onder
- Children: 6
- Education: Washington University (BS, MD); Saint Louis University (JD)
- Website: House website Campaign website

Robert Frank Onder Jr. (born January 6, 1962) is an American politician, attorney, and physician from the state of Missouri. He is the member of the United States House of Representatives for Missouri's 3rd congressional district. He is a member of the Republican Party.

Before his tenure in the House of Representatives, he was a member of the Missouri Senate from 2015 to 2023, serving the 2nd District in the St. Charles area. Onder previously was a member of the Missouri House of Representatives from 2007 to 2008.

Onder announced his bid for the 3rd district in 2024, following the announcement that incumbent Blaine Luetkemeyer would not run for reelection. After defeating six opponents to win the Republican nomination, Onder went on to win the general election against Democrat Bethany Mann.

== Personal life ==
Onder attended St. Louis University High School, graduating in 1980. Onder attended Washington University in St. Louis for his undergraduate degree, where he graduated summa cum laude with a degree in Economics. Onder subsequently graduated from Washington University School of Medicine, and is a physician specializing in allergy and asthma care. He later graduated from Saint Louis University School of Law. He and his wife Allison have six children. Onder has recently obtained his pilot’s license. He is Roman Catholic.

== Political campaigns ==
Onder served a single term in the Missouri House of Representatives from 2007 to 2008, having been elected in 2006.

In 2008, Onder left the state legislature to run for the US House in Missouri's 9th congressional district, where incumbent Kenny Hulshof was not seeking re-election. Onder distinguished himself as one of the more fiscally conservative candidates, emphasizing his free-market voting record in the Missouri House and earning the endorsement of the Club for Growth. Onder ultimately lost the Republican primary election to Blaine Luetkemeyer.

In 2014, Onder ran for the Missouri Senate in the 2nd district, defeating Chuck Gatschenberger and Vicki Schneider in the Republican primary. No Democrats ran for the seat, so this primary victory was tantamount to election. Onder ran for reelection in 2018 and defeated his Democratic challenger to earn a second term.

In 2022, Onder announced his campaign for Saint Charles County Executive. He withdrew from the Republican primary on June 7, 2022.

In 2024, Onder ran for Lieutenant Governor of Missouri. He later withdrew from that race and announced his candidacy for Missouri's 3rd congressional district.

== State legislature ==
=== Missouri House of Representatives ===
==== Immigration reform ====
In 2008, Onder authored and sponsored HB 1549. The bill forbids the creation of sanctuary cities in Missouri, allows for cancellation of state contracts for contractors who hire people illegally present in the United States, and requires public agencies to verify the legal status of immigrants before providing social service benefits. Additionally the bill criminalized the transportation of immigrants for exploitative purposes. The bill passed the State House and Senate with strong support and was signed into law by Matt Blunt.

==== Abortion ====
Onder also sponsored legislation that would have strengthened Missouri's informed consent before abortion statute, including requiring abortion clinics to allow pregnant women the opportunity to view an ultrasound of the fetus. The bill also would have criminalized coercing a woman to have an abortion through abuse, violence or threats. The bill passed the State House by a vote of 112-33 but died after a filibuster in the State Senate.

=== Missouri Senate ===
==== Leadership ====
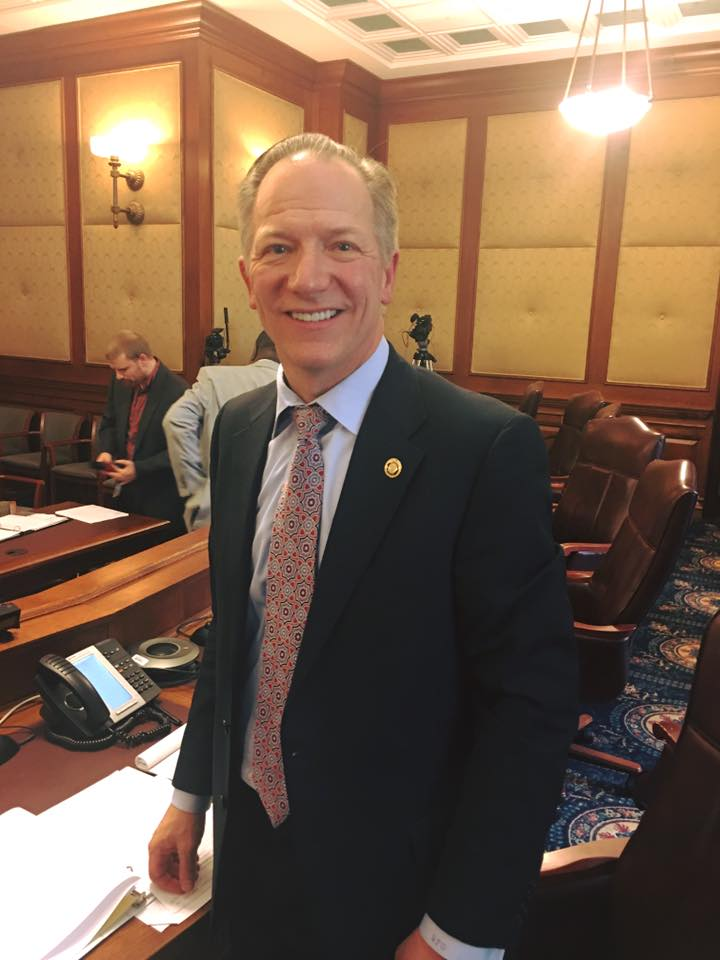
Onder in the Missouri Senate

In his first year in the Senate, Onder was elected to Senate leadership as Assistant Majority Floor Leader. In 2017 he became the Chairman of the General Laws Committee. Additionally, he serves as Vice-Chairman of the Committee on Judiciary and Civil and Criminal Jurisprudence. In 2016, Onder attended the 2016 Republican National Convention after his selection as a Trump delegate as part of the Missouri delegation.

==== Caucus membership ====
Onder was a founding member of the Missouri Senate's Conservative Caucus. The Conservative Caucus's top issues include regulatory reform, tort reform, health care reform, abortion, and gun rights.

==== Foreign policy ====
Onder played a leading role in sponsoring SB 739 a bill that precluded Missourians from state contracts if they participate in boycotts against Israel. The bill mandates that public entities ensure that any company with which it enters into a contract includes a written confirmation they are not participating in such boycotts. The bill was subsequently signed into law by Governor Mike Parson.

==== Social issues ====
In 2016, Onder introduced Senate Joint Resolution 39, a proposed amendment to the Missouri Constitution that would protect wedding industry businesses that refuse to serve LGBTQIA+ couples. This bill passed the Senate over a Democratic filibuster, but failed to make it out of committee in the House.

Onder was an outspoken supporter of HB 1562, a bill that expanded the crime of sex trafficking to include the advertisement of minors for prostitution or pornography.

Onder, who is anti-abortion, was the original author of legislation that requires annual, unannounced state inspections of healthcare clinics that provide reproductive healthcare; bars clinics from instructing ambulances to silence their sirens or turn their lights off; mandates that pathologists test fetal tissue; enacts whistleblower protections for employees of abortion clinics; and exempts pregnancy resource centers from a St. Louis ordinance barring discrimination over reproductive choices. Onder's bill received a few significant changes, such as changing the pathologist deadline from 24 hours to five days, and became Senate Bill 5, with a new sponsor in Senator Andrew Koenig. The bill was strengthened and passed by the Missouri House of Representatives, then passed by a vote of 22-9 in the Missouri Senate and signed by Governor Eric Greitens.

In 2019, Onder strongly pushed for the Missouri Stands for the Unborn Act, a bill that banned abortion at eight weeks of pregnancy or later. The bill also banned abortions due to race, sex or a diagnosis of Down syndrome. The Missouri Senate passed the bill 24-10, and was subsequently passed by the house. The bill was signed into law by Governor Mike Parson.

==== Ethics ====
Onder also advocated for ethics reform, sponsoring and handling legislation that called for a "cooling off period" between when Missouri legislators leave office and when they can become lobbyists. Onder said that public service "is not supposed to be our pathway job into a lucrative lobbying job." Additionally, Onder sponsored a bill that would have banned gifts from lobbyists to legislators in Missouri.

==== Labor reform ====
Onder supported legislation that would have made Missouri the 28th Right-to-Work state. The bill passed through Onder's General Laws Committee before being sent to the Senate floor. While the bill was signed into law by Eric Greitens, it was later repealed by ballot initiative.

Onder authored SB 182, a bill that banned union-only project labor agreements in Missouri. The bill was signed into law by Governor Greitens.

In 2018, Onder handled HB 1413, a landmark public union bill that created transparency and accountability to protect the rights of Missouri public sector unions. Onder passed the bill through the Senate and HB 1413 was signed into law.

==== Economic issues ====
In 2017, Onder was the Senate handler for HB 130, a bill that creates a statewide regulatory framework for transportation networking companies. The bill passed with overwhelming support by a vote of 144-7 in the House and by 30-1 in the Senate. Missouri Governor Eric Greitens signed the bill into law.

In 2019, Onder introduced bills aimed at deregulating the Missouri economy. One of Onder's bills would only require cars 10 years old or older and 150,000 miles to be inspected, as opposed to 5 year old cars as under current law. Onder claimed the inspection requirement is a waste of time and money for citizens. "It disrupts the single mom, the senior citizens, the working parents day and their week these unnecessary and costly inspections," Onder stated.

Onder worked to defeat a proposed HMO tax in 2019. On his opposition to the tax, Onder stated: "Two of my most important promises to my constituents when I ran for Senate were to fight the rising costs of health care for businesses and their employees, and to oppose tax increases. So when a new health insurance tax was proposed by my own party, I was obligated to oppose it, regardless of political cost." Due to the opposition of Onder and other senators, the HMO tax proposal was removed.

In 2020, Onder introduced SB 560, a bill that would grant state licensing reciprocity to nonresident military spouses. While testifying in favor of his bill before the Veterans and Military Affairs Committee, Onder declared: "military spouses do not lose their knowledge or skills as they cross state lines in the service to their country. This is the least we can do for these heroes and their families."

==== Second Amendment ====
In 2019, Onder introduced legislation to allow people with concealed carry permits to bring a firearm onto public transit. Onder cited safety concerns and problems of crime on public transit. Onder said that the current law prevents "the right of law-abiding citizens to defend themselves." The bill did not pass that session, so Onder refiled it for the 2020 legislative session.

==== Committee assignments (2019–2021) ====
- Commerce, Consumer Protection, Energy & the Environment
- Education
- Health and Pensions, Chairman
- Judiciary and Civil and Criminal Jurisprudence, (Vice-Chairman)
- Ways and Means
- Joint Committee on Administrative Rules
- Joint Committee on Public Assistance
- Joint Committee on Tax Policy
- Select Committee on Redistricting
- Task Force on Substance Abuse Prevention and Treatment

==== Committee assignments (2017–2019) ====
- Health and Pensions (Chairman)
- Judiciary and Civil and Criminal Jurisprudence (Vice-Chairman)
- Commerce, Consumer Protection, Energy & the Environment
- Education
- Ways and Means
- Joint Committee on Administrative Rules
- Joint Committee on Tax Policy

==== Legislative awards and other honors ====
Onder has won several awards during his time in the Missouri Senate, including

- 2015 Missouri Academy of Family Physicians Award
- 2015 Missouri Centurion Award
- 2015 Missouri Alliance for Freedom Champion of Freedom Award
- 2015 Missouri Chamber of Commerce and Industry Freshman of the Year Award
- 2016 American Conservative Union Conservative Excellence Award
- 2016 Missouri Family Policy Council Missouri Family Champion Award
- 2016 Missouri Dental Association Legislative Excellence Award
- 2017 Missouri Association of Prosecuting Attorneys Legislative Champion Award
- 2017 Missouri Chamber of Commerce Spirit of Enterprise Award
- 2018 American Legislative Exchange Council Legislator of the Week Award
- 2019 Missouri Solar Energy Industries Association Award
- 2020 Missouri Association of Prosecuting Attorneys Legislative Champion Award
- 2020 American Conservative Union Award for Conservative Excellence

== U.S. House of Representatives ==
=== Tenure ===
Onder has commented on investigations of the Jeffrey Epstein client list, saying that delays are indicative of influence used to escape justice. Onder has not committed to supporting the discharge petition or congressional measure to release the files.

=== Committee assignments ===
For the 119th Congress:

- Committee on Education and Workforce
  - Subcommittee on Health, Employment, Labor, and Pensions
  - Subcommittee on Higher Education and Workforce Development
- Committee on the Judiciary
  - Subcommittee on the Constitution and Limited Government
  - Subcommittee on Immigration Integrity, Security, and Enforcement
  - Subcommittee on Oversight
- Committee on Transportation and Infrastructure
  - Subcommittee on Aviation
  - Subcommittee on Economic Development, Public Buildings, and Emergency Management
  - Subcommittee on Water Resources and Environment

== Electoral history ==
2006 Primary Election for Missouri's 13th District House of Representatives
Party	Candidate	Votes	%
Republican	Bob Onder	2,685	46.1
Republican	Chuck Gatschenberger	1,051	18.0
Republican	Paul Espinoza	1,039	17.8
Republican	Denise Hackman	723	12.4
Republican	Stephanie Bell	327	5.2
Total votes		5,825	100

2006 General Election for Missouri's 13th District House of Representatives
Party	Candidate	Votes	%
Republican	Bob Onder	16,406	100
Total votes		16,406	100

2008 Primary Election for Missouri's 9th Congressional District
Party	Candidate	Votes	%
Republican	Blaine Luetkemeyer	21,543	39.7
Republican	Bob Onder	15,752	29.0
Republican	Danielle Moore	10,609	19.5
Republican	Brock Olivo	5,501	10.1
Republican	Dan Bishir	890	1.6
Total votes		54,295	100

2014 Primary Election for Missouri's 2nd Senate District
Party	Candidate	Votes	%
Republican	Bob Onder	14,305	63.57
Republican	Vicki Schneider	4,561	20.27
Republican	Chuck Gatschenberger	3,635	16.15
Total votes		22,501	100.00

2014 General Election for Missouri's 2nd Senate District
Party	Candidate	Votes	%
Republican	Bob Onder	37,607	100
Total votes		37,607	100

2018 Primary Election for Missouri's 2nd Senate District
Party	Candidate	Votes	%
Republican	Bob Onder	21,842	100
Total votes		21,842	100

2018 General Election for Missouri's 2nd Senate District
Party	Candidate	Votes	%
Republican	Bob Onder	52,197	59.7
Democratic	Patrice Billings	35,258	40.3
Total votes		87,455	100

Republican primary results by county: Onder: 40–50% 50–60%; 60–70%; Schaefer: 40–50%; 50–60%

2024 Primary Election for Missouri's 3rd Congressional District
Party	Candidate	Votes	%
Republican	Bob Onder	48,833	47.37%
Republican	Kurt Schaefer	38,375	37.22%
Republican	Bruce Bowman	4,508	4.37%
Republican	Justin Hicks (withdrawn)	4,425	4.29%
Republican	Kyle Bone	3,548	3.44%
Republican	Chad Bicknell	1,842	1.79%
Republican	Arnie Dienoff	1,560	1.51%
Total votes		103,091	100.00%

2024 General Election for Missouri's 3rd Congressional District
Party	Candidate	Votes	%
Republican	Bob Onder	240,620	61.31%
Democratic	Bethany Mann	138,532	35.30%
Libertarian	Jordan Rowden	9,298	2.37%
Green	William Hastings	4,013	1.02%
Total votes		392,463	100.00%
Republican hold			

U.S. House of Representatives
Preceded by Blaine Luetkemeyer	Member of the U.S. House of Representatives from Missouri's 3rd congressional district 2025–present	Incumbent
U.S. order of precedence (ceremonial)
Preceded by Johnny Olszewski	United States representatives by seniority 410th	Succeeded by Nellie Pou
