= Timberland High School (Missouri) =

American high school in Missouri

Location
- 559 E Highway N Wentzville, Missouri 63385; United States; 38.7737°N 90.8451°W

Information
- Type: Public co-ed secondary
- Established: 2002; 24 years ago
- School district: Wentzville R-IV School District
- NCES District ID: 2931650
- NCES School ID: 293165002844
- Principal: Kyle Lindquist
- Teaching staff: 97.87 (on an FTE basis)
- Grades: 9–12
- Enrollment: 1,614 (2023–24)
- Student to teacher ratio: 16.49
- Campus: Suburban
- Colors: Hunter green, navy, silver
- Nickname: Wolves
- Rival: Wentzville Holt High School
- Website: ths.wentzville.k12.mo.us

Timberland High School is the largest of the four high schools in the Wentzville R-IV School District and fourth-largest high school in St. Charles County, Missouri. It was established as an annex in 2000 and as an independent high school in 2002. The 2020-21 enrollment was 1,845.

== History ==
The facility now known as Timberland High School opened on August 28, 2000, as an annex to Wentzville Holt High School for about 400 freshmen and sophomores from the southern portion of the school district. In May 2001, the board of education voted to name the new high school Timberland High School, a name submitted by sophomore Jaci Woodburn. Timberland became a fully independent four-year high school in 2002.

== Academics ==
48% of the class of 2014 graduates went on to attend a four-year college. 35.5% entered a two-year college, while 8% entered the workforce or military service.

In 2014, the average composite ACT score for Timberland was 22.9, which was above the state average of 21.8 and national average of 21.0

Timberland High School received A+ designation on May 23, 2002. The A+ Schools program is a school improvement initiative established by the Outstanding Schools Act of 1993. Graduates who meet the seven A+ state requirements are eligible for tuition reimbursement and general fee reimbursement to attend any public community college or vocational/technical school in the State of Missouri.

== Athletics ==
Scott Swofford Stadium was dedicated in October 2002. Swofford was a long time head football coach at Wentzville Holt High School from 1986 to 1998. He spent the last two years of his coaching career as an assistant the running backs and special teams coach for the Washington University Bears. During his first year at Washington University, the team earned its only NCAA playoff appearance in its history. Swofford died suddenly of a heart attack in September 2000. His wife, Runa Swofford, worked at Timberland and years ago purchased a bell in her husband's name. The tradition of ringing that bell after football victories continues today. There is also a seniors vs. faculty basketball game dedicated to Scott. All three high schools in the district have their own Swofford games.

== Notable alumni ==
- Montee Ball (2009) — former NFL running back for the Denver Broncos and New England Patriots
