= Wentzville Holt High School =

Location
- 600 Campus Drive; Wentzville, Missouri 63385; United States; 38.8163°N 90.8667°W

Information
- Type: Public co-ed secondary
- Established: 1896; 130 years ago
- School district: Wentzville R-IV School District
- NCES District ID: 2931650
- NCES School ID: 293165002208
- Principal: Shane Schlueter
- Teaching staff: 76.97 (on an FTE basis)
- Grades: 9–12
- Enrollment: 1,022 (2024–2025)
- Student to teacher ratio: 13.28
- Schedule: 8 Period Drop, (7 academic periods daily, 1 advisory period weekly)
- Colors: Navy and Vegas Gold
- Athletics conference: Gateway Conference
- Nickname: Indians
- Rival: Timberland High School
- Accreditation: North Central Association; Missouri School Improvement Program (MISP); A+ School
- Newspaper: TribeLife
- Yearbook: Pow Wow
- Website: hhs.wentzville.k12.mo.us

Wentzville Holt High School (Emil E. Holt Sr. High School, or simply Holt High School) is the oldest of the four high schools in the Wentzville R-IV School District and second oldest high school in St. Charles County, Missouri. With a 2020–21 enrollment of 1,934, Holt is the largest high school in St. Charles County. Although officially known as Emil E. Holt Senior High School since 1969, it was generally known only as Wentzville High School until 2000, when a renewed emphasis was placed on the "Holt" name in preparation for the addition of a second high school in the district.

== History ==
Wentzville High School was first established in 1896 as a 2-year high school. The first principal in 1896 was professor J. Herring. The high school had only three graduates in the first graduating class of 1898: Pearl Marsch, Pearl Ball, and Emma Dula. The original high school building now houses the Green Lantern Senior Center in Wentzville. The first high school building burned in 1908, but it was rebuilt and continued to be used as the high school.

The high school building was expanded in 1938, and in 1939 it was reorganized as a full 4-year high school under the authority of a school board with state recognition. As Wentzville High School grew in enrollment, a new high school building at 405 Campus Drive was built in 1962.

The football field, known as Soby Field, was built in 1965 and named as a memorial to Missouri State Highway Patrol sergeant Herbert L. Sobolewski. Herbert "Soby" Sobolewski suffered a heart attack during the previous year while directing traffic near a tractor-trailer crash on U.S. Highway 40 (now Interstate 64) near Wentzville.

In 1969, the high school was officially named after Emil E. Holt, a community leader and president of the Wentzville State Bank. Holt served on the school board for 46 years, including 42 of them as treasurer from 1927 to 1969. Despite the formal designation, Holt's name was rarely used in reference to the high school over the next 30 years. In 1975 the current high school building was constructed as the Wentzville Middle School at 600 Campus Drive and was occupied by students in grades 7 and 8, while high school students in grades 9 through 12 remained in the 1962 building. An expansion of the 1975 building in the late 1980s enabled the move of high school students to that building and the redesignation of the 1962 building as the Wentzville Middle School. In 1989, the school board designated January 23 as a date to acknowledge the accomplishments of Emil Holt, recognizing that most students and faculty still had not adopted the Holt name for the high school. At that time a photo of Holt was moved from a library conference room to a more prominent location. In 2000 the name Holt High School was finally added to the exterior of the building, replacing the Wentzville High School signage.

In 2007, a two-story addition was completed on the north side of the building, adding 26,426 square feet of new space including six new classrooms and two science laboratories. In addition, the project included renovation of 10,150 square feet which increased cafeteria capacity and expanded and renovated kitchen and serving areas. The project was designed to accommodate a third story addition at a future date. The third story classroom addition to the high school was completed in December 2016.

In 2017, Holt High senior Simon Osler launched an unsuccessful petition to change the school's mascot, arguing that the Indian mascot is an "outdated and offensive caricature." The movement resulted in swift backlash from most students and the Wentzville community, and was met with a counter petition from a recent Holt alumna with nearly five times more supporters to keep the Indian mascot. The controversy received substantial coverage by St. Louis area news media. School district leadership announced there were no plans to change the mascot.

Construction of a second gym at Holt High was completed in 2020. The addition of a second gym, made possible by the passage of Prop E bond issue in 2018, was needed to bring Holt High gym space up to the same standards as the other high schools in the school district.

== Block schedule ==
The decision to implement a block schedule plan grew out of a planning effort to develop a vision and a program of improvement for the high school. The planning team behind the move toward block scheduling consisted of teachers, students, parents, and administrators, and it began meeting in 1993. Following the implementation of block scheduling in 1995, Wentzville served as a model for many other districts throughout the Midwest looking to adopt similar scheduling systems.

After months of debate and strong protest from students, the Wentzville Board of Education voted 6–1 in February 2007 to change from block schedule back to a traditional seven-block schedule beginning in the fall. The controversial move came following District Superintendent Terry Adams' request that district principals explore options to save money and increase instructional time in core subjects. Approximately 200 residents attended the board meeting to protest such a schedule change. They argued that reverting to traditional scheduling would result in less project-based learning and lab time, more chaos between classes, and less time for individualized instruction. Some board members cited flat standardized test scores over the past few years as another reason for the change. They stressed the district's need to concentrate on improving performance levels on a global scale to reach international benchmarks, rather than only comparing performance to other area districts. Adams also referenced studies that indicate block scheduling results in higher grades but lower achievement. Other sources have produced information that shows schools on the block schedule in Missouri have achieved higher grades and levels of achievement.

== Academics ==
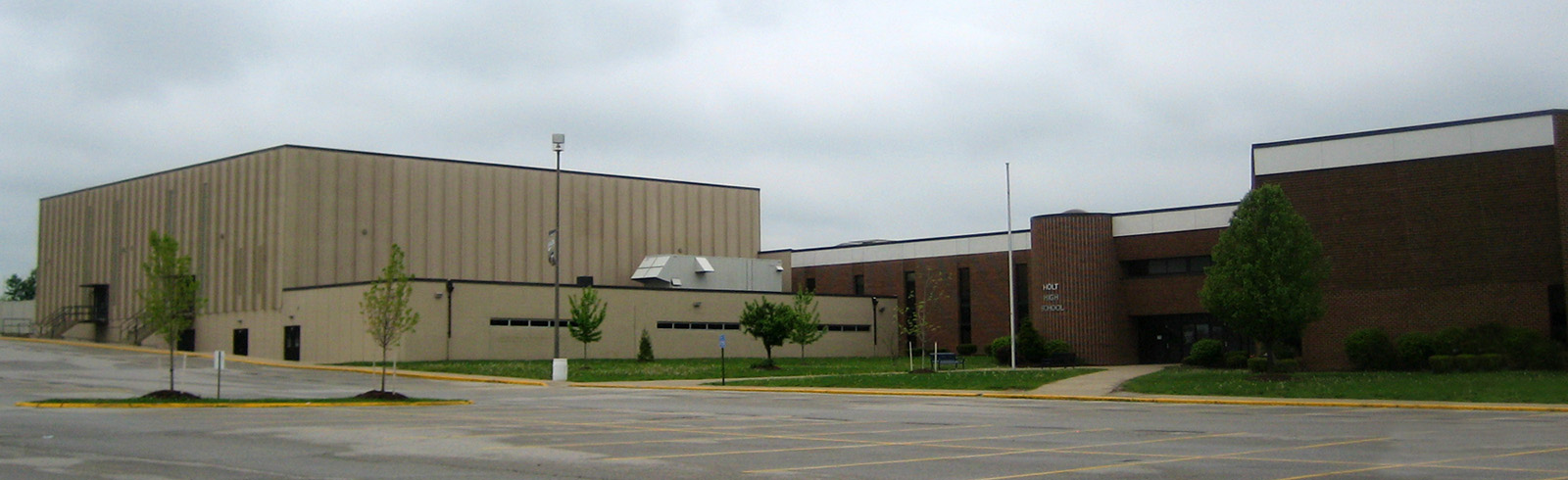
View of Holt High School from the South, with main gymnasium to the left and C.H. Jones Auditorium to the right

In 2011, Holt's official graduation rate was 94.6%, which is the highest graduation rate for Holt in the past ten years. While the graduation rate was just short of 95%, only 40% of the class of 2011 graduates went on to attend a four-year college. 37% entered a two-year college, while 13% entered the workforce or military service.

In 2011, the average composite ACT score for Holt rose to 22.2, which was an increase from the 2010 average of 22.0. 73.54% of graduates were tested.

In 1997, Holt High School became the first high school in St. Charles County to receive A+ designation. The A+ Schools program is a school improvement initiative established by the Outstanding Schools Act of 1993. Graduates who meet the seven A+ state requirements are eligible for tuition reimbursement and general fee reimbursement to attend any public community college or vocational/technical school in the State of Missouri.

== Staff ==
As of 2010, Holt High School faculty have an average of 12.8 years of experience, and the average student to classroom teacher ratio is 18:1. The average annual salary is $54,173 for teachers and $100,329 for administrators, and 74.2% of teachers have a master's degree or higher. All of these figures are above their respective state averages. As of September 2017, the student teacher ratio had reached 15 to 1.

== Athletics ==
Until recently, the school's traditional colors were royal blue and gold. A couple of years after the "Holt" name was re-emphasized for the school, new athletic coaches and staff began re-branding the teams with new logos and a change in colors to the current Navy and Vegas Gold. Among the new logos used is a navy blue and gold version of the Power H logo formerly associated with the defunct New York/New Jersey Hitmen football team of the XFL. Since the Hitmen ceased operations in 2001 and the trademark was officially abandoned, dozens of high school athletic programs and amateur sports clubs across the United States began using modified versions of the Hitmen logo.

=== MSHSAA sanctioned sports ===

Holt's MSHSAA sanctioned sports compete in the South Division of the Gateway Athletic Conference. Until recently, the school's traditional colors were royal blue and gold.

- Fall sports
  - Cross Country (Boys & Girls) (Class 4, District #5)
  - Football (Class 5, District #2)
  - Volleyball (Girls) (Class 4, District #8)
  - Softball (Girls) (Class 4, District 9)
  - Soccer (Boys) (Class 3, District #9)
  - Swimming (Boys)
  - Golf (Girls) (Class 2, District #4)
  - Tennis (Girls) (Class 2, District #4)
  - Cheerleading
  - Dance Team
  - Band
- Winter sports
  - Swimming (Girls)
  - Basketball (Boys) (Class 6, District #7)
  - Basketball (Girls) (Class 6, District #7)
  - Cheerleading
  - Dance Team
  - Wrestling (Class 4, District #4)
- Spring sports
  - Baseball (Boys) (Class 5, District #8)
  - Golf (Boys) (Class 4, District #5)
  - Soccer (Girls) (Class 2, District #6)
  - Tennis (Boys) (Class 2, District #7)
  - Track and Field (Boys & Girls) (Class 4, District #5)

==== MSHSAA State championships ====
State Championships and Runner Up Finishes
Sport/activity	Number of championships	Year
Dance	1	2023 (1st)
Wrestling Boys	4	1986 (2nd), 1987 (1st), 1992 (1st), 1993 (2nd), 1994 (2nd), 2007 (1st), 2008 (1st), 2015 (2nd)
Golf Boys	2	1985 (1st), 1990 (1st)
Softball	0	1983 (2nd), 1987 (2nd), 2014 (2nd)
Baseball	0	2007 (2nd)
Football	0	2021 (2nd)

=== Non-MSHSAA sanctioned sports ===
==== Ice hockey ====
The Holt High School ice hockey team is a club sports program that competes in the St. Charles Division of the Mid-States Club Hockey Association, which is the main high school hockey league in Missouri. The Wentzville High School ice hockey program first competed in 1996. The team won its first division championship in 2000. When Timberland High School was constructed, its students could play for the Wentzville Holt team for several years until Timberland also formed its own hockey program. The two teams now play an annual rivalry game for the Crossroads Cup. In 2011, the Holt hockey team defeated Rockwood Summit High School 3–2 in overtime in the championship game at Scottrade Center to become the first high school hockey team from St. Charles County to win the Wickenheiser Cup championship. The Wickenheiser Cup, along with the Challenge Cup, are the two state championship trophies awarded for high school ice hockey. In March 2013, the Holt Indians captured their second state championship in three years, when they defeated the Duchesne Pioneers in the Wickenheiser Cup title game at Scottrade Center.

==== Other sports ====
- Roller Hockey
- Lacrosse (Missouri Scholastic Lacrosse Association)
- Bowling (St. Charles High School League, USBC sanctioned)

== Clubs and organizations ==
- In 2009, the Ratchet Rockers FIRST Robotics Competition Team won the St. Louis regional.
- In 2009, Randall Ray ('09) and Leslie Young ('09) received the First Place Grand Award from the Intel International Science and Engineering Fair for their project: Transforming Ipomoea batatas via Direct Inoculation with Agrobaterium rhizogenes, a Continuation within the plant science category.
- Erica Loesche and Ryan Biggs selected as members of the International Thespian Society's All-State Show, Jekyll and Hyde: The Musical, in 2010.

== Notable alumni ==
- Dan Alexander (1996) – former NFL player with the Tennessee Titans (2001), Jacksonville Jaguars (2002) and St. Louis Rams (2003)
- Judson Birza (2007) – winner of Survivor: Nicaragua
- Ross Detwiler (2004) – professional baseball player
- Tim Melville (2008) – professional baseball player
- Lee Ann Miller (1980) – 1984 Olympic and four-time World team pairs figure skater
- Ethan Place (2001) – former Scout Sniper with the United States Marine Corps and recipient of the Silver Star, featured in the History Channel documentary One Shot/One Kill
- Tony Purler (1988) – former folkstyle and freestyle wrestler
