= Wentzville, Missouri =

- City
- City of Wentzville
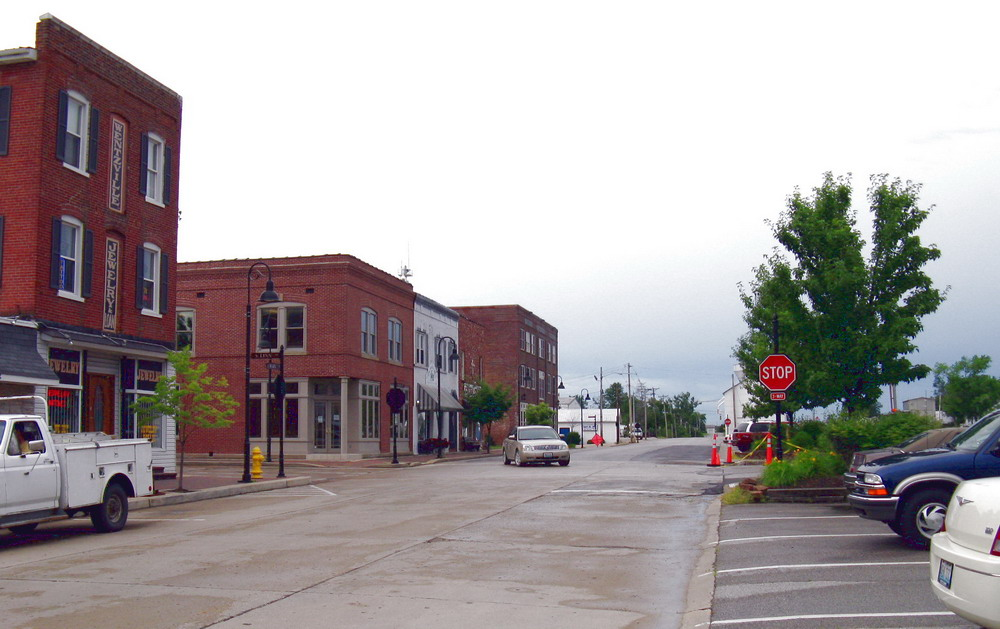
- Old Downtown Wentzville

- Flag Logo

- Location of Wentzville
- Coordinates: 38°48′41″N 90°51′11″W
- Country: United States
- State: Missouri
- County: St. Charles County
- Founded: 1855
- Incorporated: 1872
- Named for: Erasmus Livingston Wentz

Government
  - Mayor: Nick Guccione

Area
  - Total: 20.94 sq mi (54.24 km^{2})
  - Land: 20.93 sq mi (54.20 km^{2})
  - Water: 0.012 sq mi (0.03 km^{2})
- Elevation: 620 ft (190 m)

Population (2020)
  - Total: 44,372
  - Estimate (2024): 48,646
  - Density: 2,120/sq mi (818.6/km^{2})
- Time zone: UTC−6 (Central (CST))
  - Summer (DST): UTC−5 (CDT)
- ZIP code: 63385
- Area code: 636
- FIPS code: 29-78442
- GNIS feature ID: 0756888
- Website: www.wentzvillemo.gov

Wentzville is a city and suburb of St. Louis in western St. Charles County, Missouri, United States. As of the 2024 U.S. Census Bureau estimates, the city had a population of 48,646, making it Missouri's 15th-largest city. Wentzville was Missouri's fastest-growing city by percentage increase from 2000 to 2020.

== History ==
Wentzville was laid out in 1855. The community is named for Erasmus Livingston Wentz, a chief engineer of the Northern Missouri Railroad. A post office called Wentzville has been in operation since 1859.

Wentzville is the location of the first Vietnam Veterans Memorial in the United States. It began in 1967 as a tree of lights to help raise money to send gifts to active servicemen. By 1984 it had become a carved eagle atop a pillar of granite. It is a regular stop in the national "Run for the Wall" trip for veterans.

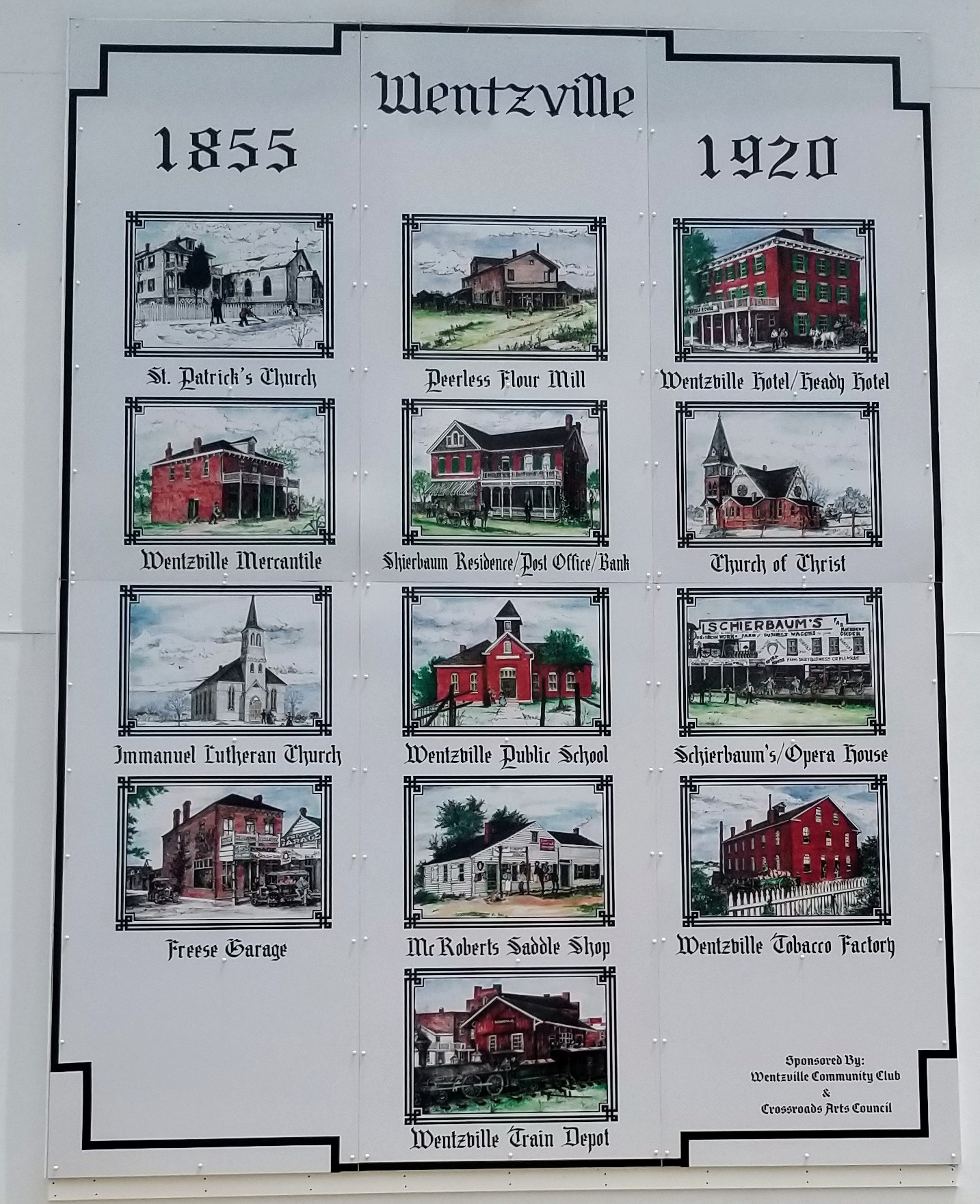
Mural posted on the side of a downtown building

Musician George Thorogood wrote the song "Back to Wentzville", the first track of his 1982 album Bad to the Bone, for rock pioneer Chuck Berry, who had a home in the area.

The Wentzville Tobacco Company Factory was listed on the National Register of Historic Places in 1990.

One of the 13 U.S. service members killed in the 2021 Kabul airport attack was from Wentzville.

== Geography ==
According to the United States Census Bureau, the city has an area of 19.98 square miles (51.75 km^{2}), of which 19.96 square miles (51.70 km^{2}) is land and 0.02 square miles (0.05 km^{2}) is water.

== Demographics ==
Historical population
| Census | Pop. | Note | %± |
|---|---|---|---|
| 1880 | 541 | | — |
| 1890 | 457 | | −15.5% |
| 1900 | 519 | | 13.6% |
| 1910 | 539 | | 3.9% |
| 1920 | 514 | | −4.6% |
| 1930 | 596 | | 16.0% |
| 1940 | 752 | | 26.2% |
| 1950 | 1,227 | | 63.2% |
| 1960 | 2,742 | | 123.5% |
| 1970 | 3,223 | | 17.5% |
| 1980 | 3,193 | | −0.9% |
| 1990 | 5,088 | | 59.3% |
| 2000 | 7,058 | | 38.7% |
| 2010 | 29,070 | | 311.9% |
| 2020 | 44,372 | | 52.6% |
| 2024 (est.) | 48,646 | | 9.6% |
U.S. Decennial Census; 2024 Estimate

=== 2020 census ===
As of the 2020 census, Wentzville had a population of 44,372 and 14,939 households; the census recorded 10,406 families and a population density of 2,120.0 inhabitants per square mile (818.5/km^{2}).

There were 15,316 housing units, 2.5% of which were vacant; the homeowner vacancy rate was 0.9% and the rental vacancy rate was 4.5%.

Of all households, 46.7% had children under the age of 18, 62.9% were married-couple households, 10.9% had a male householder with no spouse or partner present, and 20.1% had a female householder with no spouse or partner present; 16.9% were made up of individuals, and 7.6% had someone living alone who was 65 years of age or older. The average household size was 3.0 and the average family size was 3.4.

The median age was 34.6 years. 30.8% of residents were under the age of 18 and 11.4% of residents were 65 years of age or older. For every 100 females there were 94.3 males, and for every 100 females age 18 and over there were 90.8 males age 18 and over.

99.9% of residents lived in urban areas, while 0.1% lived in rural areas.

Racial composition as of the 2020 census
| Race | Number | Percent |
|---|---|---|
| White | 37,681 | 84.9% |
| Black or African American | 2,600 | 5.9% |
| American Indian and Alaska Native | 104 | 0.2% |
| Asian | 663 | 1.5% |
| Native Hawaiian and Other Pacific Islander | 12 | 0.0% |
| Some other race | 450 | 1.0% |
| Two or more races | 2,862 | 6.5% |
| Hispanic or Latino (of any race) | 1,478 | 3.3% |

=== 2016–2020 American Community Survey ===
The 2016–2020 5-year American Community Survey estimates show that the median household income was $93,602 (with a margin of error of +/- $3,824) and the median family income was $99,855 (+/- $2,973). Males had a median income of $61,049 (+/- $1,956) versus $38,934 (+/- $1,579) for females. The median income for those above 16 years old was $50,251 (+/- $2,286). Approximately, 2.1% of families and 3.3% of the population were below the poverty line, including 4.4% of those under the age of 18 and 2.2% of those ages 65 or over.

=== 2010 census ===
As of the census of 2010, there were 29,070 people, 9,767 households, and 7,852 families living in the city. The population density was 1,456.4 inhabitants per square mile (562.3/km^{2}). There were 10,305 housing units at an average density of 516.3 per square mile (199.3/km^{2}). The racial makeup of the city was 89.9% White, 6.0% African American, 0.3% Native American, 1.2% Asian, 0.8% from other races, and 1.9% from two or more races. Hispanic or Latino of any race were 2.7% of the population.

There were 9,767 households, of which 51.5% had children under the age of 18 living with them, 65.3% were married couples living together, 11.1% had a female householder with no husband present, 4.0% had a male householder with no wife present, and 19.6% were non-families. 15.6% of all households were made up of individuals, and 5% had someone living alone who was 65 years of age or older. The average household size was 2.96 and the average family size was 3.31.

The median age in the city was 31.2 years. 33.7% of residents were under the age of 18; 6.2% were between the ages of 18 and 24; 33.7% were from 25 to 44; 19% were from 45 to 64; and 7.5% were 65 years of age or older. The gender makeup of the city was 48.5% male and 51.5% female.

=== 2000 census ===
As of the census of 2000, there were 13,931 people, 2,456 households, and 1,846 families living in the city. The population density was 478.9 inhabitants per square mile (184.9/km^{2}). There were 2,724 housing units at an average density of 189.2 per square mile (73.1/km^{2}). The racial makeup of the city was 84.63% White, 12.02% African American, 0.16% Native American, 0.55% Asian, 0.06% Pacific Islander, 0.52% from other races, 2.06% from two or more races. 1.49% of the population were Hispanic or Latino of any race.

There were 2,456 households, out of which 43.5% had children under the age of 18 living with them, 54.5% were married couples living together, 17.1% had a female householder with no husband present, and 24.8% were non-families. 20.7% of all households were made up of individuals, and 9.1% had someone living alone who was 65 years of age or older. The average household size was 2.76 and the average family size was 3.20.

In the city, the population was spread out, with 31.8% under the age of 18, 9.2% from 18 to 24, 30.7% from 25 to 44, 17.4% from 45 to 64, and 10.8% who were 65 years of age or older. The median age was 31 years. For every 100 females, there were 87.6 males. For every 100 females age 18 and over, there were 82.5 males.

The median income for a household in the city was $47,232, and the median income for a family was $53,082. Males had a median income of $38,423 versus $25,852 for females. The per capita income for the city was $18,039. 11.6% of the population and 10.1% of families were below the poverty line. Out of the total population, 19.1% of those under the age of 18 and 13.3% of those 65 and older were living below the poverty line.

== Government ==
The government of Wentzville consists of a mayor, six aldermen (two for each ward), and a city administrator. City Administrator is a non-elected position, whereas the others are elected. Mayors serve four-year terms and aldermen serve two-year terms. The city is divided into three wards.

== Economy ==
The city's major employer is General Motors, at its full-size van and small truck assembly plant Wentzville Assembly.

One of the city's largest employers from 2013 to 2017 was Serco. The British-based company was awarded a five-year contract in 2013 to manage the implementation of the Affordable Care Act. As a result, Serco opened its ACA application processing facility in Wentzville in August that year in the building that was formerly home to the US Fidelis call center. The Wentzville Serco facility attracted national attention in 2014 after whistleblower allegations revealed that workers spent large amounts of time sleeping or playing games due to lack of work. At its peak, Serco employed about 1,500 people in Wentzville. In 2018, Serco announced the closure of the Wentzville processing center to coincide with the end of its contract with the Centers for Medicaid and Medicare Services. The closure resulted in a loss of 850 jobs.

Wentzville hosts the annual St. Charles County Fair and the St. Louis Renaissance Festival, which are held at Rotary Park.

=== Top employers ===
According to Wentzville's 2020 Popular Annual Financial Report, its top employers were:

| # | Employer | # of Employees |
|---|---|---|
| 1 | General Motors | 3,399 |
| 2 | Wentzville R-IV School District | 1,879 |
| 3 | TVS Supply Chain Solutions | 550 |
| 4 | etrailer Corp. | 436 |
| 5 | City of Wentzville | 316 |
| 6 | Compass Health Network | 274 |
| 7 | Rapid Response | 265 |
| 8 | SSM St. Joseph Health Center | 230 |
| 9 | Lear Corporation | 195 |
| 10 | RK Stratman Company Inc. | 160 |

== Education ==
The Wentzville R-IV School District covers Wentzville, Lake St. Louis, Foristell, Dardenne Prairie, and parts of O'Fallon. There are four public high schools in the Wentzville District: Wentzville Holt High School, Timberland High School, North Point High School, and Liberty High School. Liberty High School is in neighboring Lake St. Louis.

Catholic schools in Wentzville include St. Patrick School, which hosts preschool through 8th grade. Immanuel Lutheran School is a private Christian school off Highway N that offers classes from preschool through 8th grade. It is a Lutheran Exemplary status school.

Lindenwood University has a satellite campus in the building that was formerly home to the Southern Air Restaurant, which after many years as a popular stop for travelers between St. Louis and Columbia, Missouri, was last owned by Chuck Berry.

Midwest University, a primarily Korean-American Christian institution, offers undergraduate and graduate degrees in Wentzville.

Urshan University and Urshan Graduate School of Theology, educational institutions owned and operated by the United Pentecostal Church International, offer undergraduate and graduate degrees in Wentzville.

Wentzville has a public library, a branch of the St. Charles City-County Library.

== "In God We Trust" insignia controversy ==
On February 28, 2018, Sally Hunt of Maryland Heights spoke to the Wentzville Board of Aldermen about an "In God We Trust" insignia recently mounted on the dais. Hunt's speech to the council was interrupted and she was forcibly removed from the room by police acting on the order of the mayor. Hunt and the mayor differ on whether Hunt had exceeded her allotted time to speak. The ACLU sued Wentzville in April 2018 on Hunt's behalf; the suit was settled in November. City of Wentzville insurance paid the ACLU $2,670 to offset lawyers' fees and legal cost. According to the settlement's terms, Wentzville law enforcement officers will not remove a person from a council meeting without probable cause, and Wentzville will not censor speech in open forums.

== Notable people ==
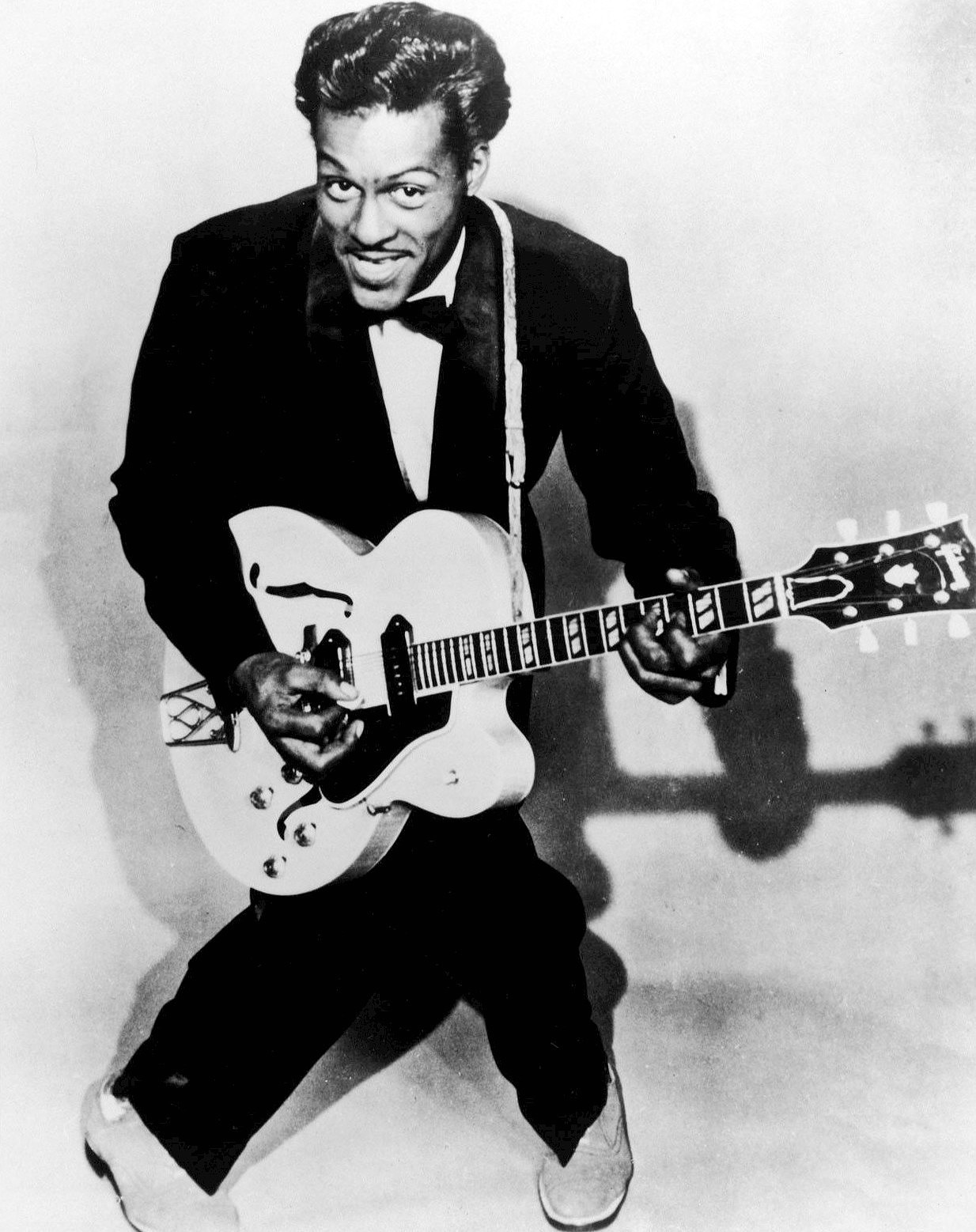
Chuck Berry owned Wentzville property since 1957 and died there in 2017.

- Dan Alexander – former American football fullback and linebacker
- Ellene Alice Bailey – 19th-century American designer and inventor
- Montee Ball – former American football running back for the Denver Broncos
- Chuck Berry – pioneering rock and roll singer, songwriter and guitarist; member of the initial class inducted into the Rock and Roll Hall of Fame
- Ross Detwiler – Major League Baseball pitcher (Nationals, Braves, Rangers, and Indians)
- Ron Hunt – former Major League Baseball player
- Tim Melville – Major League Baseball pitcher (Reds, Twins, Padres, and Rockies)
- Nathan Orf – baseball player for the Milwaukee Brewers
- Emil John Raddatz – Prussian immigrant who became a miner, politician, and businessman
- Justin Skaggs – former American football player
- Bryan Spencer – former member of the Missouri House of Representatives
- Clayton Weatherman – racing driver
- Kyle Weatherman – NASCAR driver
