= Lake St. Louis, Missouri =

Lake St. Louis
- City
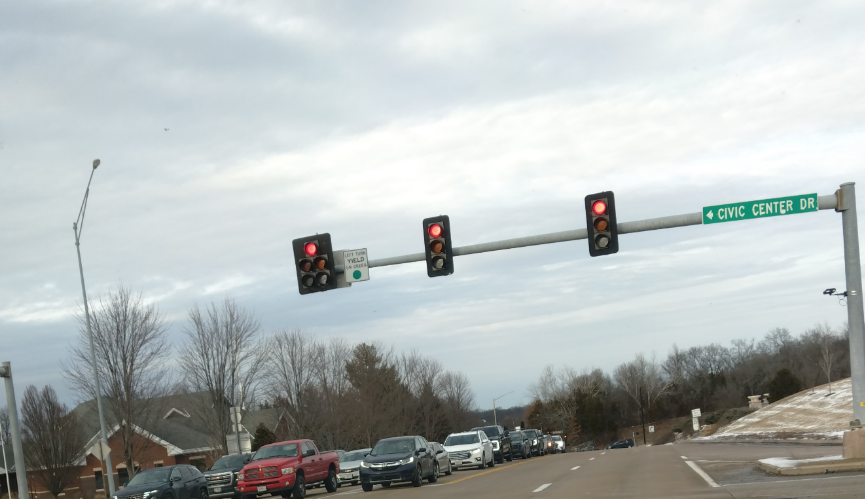
- Lake St. Louis in 2025

- Flag

- Location in the state of Missouri
- Coordinates: 38°47′12″N 90°46′48″W
- Country: United States
- State: Missouri
- County: St. Charles

Area
  - Total: 9.35 sq mi (24.22 km^{2})
  - Land: 8.54 sq mi (22.12 km^{2})
  - Water: 0.81 sq mi (2.10 km^{2})
- Elevation: 564 ft (172 m)

Population (2020)
  - Total: 16,707
  - Density: 1,956.3/sq mi (755.32/km^{2})
- Time zone: UTC-6 (CST)
  - Summer (DST): UTC-5 (CDT)
- ZIP code: 63367
- Area code: 636
- FIPS code: 29-40043
- GNIS feature ID: 2395600
- Website: http://www.lakesaintlouis.com/

The City of Lake St. Louis is a planned community and suburb of greater St. Louis, situated around two lakes between Interstate 70 and Interstate 64 in western St. Charles County, Missouri, United States. The population was 16,707 as of the 2020 US Census. Lake St. Louis is 43 miles (69 km) from the city of St. Louis.

== History ==
In January 1961, Ellis Ellerman and Ira Nathan began planning a private resort community, a popular concept in the 1960s in the St. Louis region. The vision was for a weekend resort with a lake large enough for recreation and a location close to St. Louis. Ellerman and Nathan hired engineers to begin the initial planning of the lake and community, and Nathan named the project "Lake St. Louis" in 1961.

Ellerman and Nathan formed Trails Lake Development Corp. in 1962, and by August 31 of that year, 10 lots had already been sold in the project, which was to feature a 625 lake (PD article 8–25–63). Ellerman and Nathan lacked adequate financing and business experience and soon found themselves in over their heads. They were soon joined by several other investors to keep the project afloat, including R. T. Crow. Financial troubles continued for Ellerman and Nathan, and The Healey Discount Corp., owned by Crow and three other investors, foreclosed on Trails Lake Development Corp. in June 1966.

R. T. Crow felt the location of "Lake St. Louis" (indicating a change of ownership and the "planned community" concept), between two major highways, I-70 and Rt. 61, and St. Louis's westward growth justified building a new town, not just the weekend community Ellerman and Nathan envisioned. He investigated the idea of new towns, visiting many in the east. In the end, Crow bought out the other three investors who were part of The Healey Discount Corp. and became the sole developer of the Lake St. Louis development. St. Charles County approved the preliminary plan for Lake St. Louis in April 1967. People who had purchased lots from the first developers were given credits for lots in the new project.

Lake St. Louis's first residents were the Neal family, who moved to an existing home on the property in January 1968. Gene Neal later became a vice president of one of Crow's companies, and his wife, Hazel, managed the Lake St. Louis Country Club. Their son Mike Neal played a boy in various fictional families in the development's television and print advertising, and was later a founding member of the community's water ski club.

By 1969, the 85-acre (34 ha) Lake Ste. Louise, the 9-hole, 3-par golf course, tennis courts, clubhouse and pool were open. Construction on the dam for the 600-acre (2.4 km^{2}) Lake St. Louis, the larger of the two lakes in the community, began in 1968. It was completed in 1972, and Crow filed for Chapter 11 Bankruptcy in 1974—an action brought on in part by the energy crisis. Interstate highway speeds were reduced from 70 to 55 mph (113 to 89 km/h), and the I-70 bridge over the Missouri River was closed partially while a second bridge was added. The combination of events suddenly made Lake St. Louis too far away from employment and retail centers.

With Crow out of the picture and a looming threat of annexation from O'Fallon on the east and Wentzville on the west, residents of the community's Harbor Town area petitioned St. Charles County Circuit Court for incorporation of the Town of Harbor Town. The Court granted the petition in June 1975, and with the incorporation's approval, the Circuit Court appointed a Board of Trustees: George Heidelbaugh, Charles Bailey, David Spitznagel, Betty Patton, and chairman Howard Haddock. In December 1975, the town boundaries expanded to include what was known as Phase A, the westernmost portion of the city. In 1976, a special census was conducted that counted 2,445 residents. Residents voted in 1977 to change the name to Lake St. Louis and become a 4th Class City under the Revised Statutes of Missouri. Haddock was elected as the first mayor of the city.

== Community association ==
The two lakes in Lake St. Louis are private, owned by the Lake St. Louis Community Association (LSLCA). The LSLCA was formed to maintain and administer Lake St. Louis's amenities and provide services for the recreation-oriented community. It is funded by an assessment on property in the LSLCA membership area. Originally all owners of property in the city were automatically members of the LSLCA, but as the city grew, the need to prevent lake overcrowding resulted in newer residential developments not having membership in the LSLCA. Since the lakes, a country club, marinas, and several park areas are the property of the community association, they are not available for use by non-members. This means that many residents of the city are not permitted to use the lakes.

== Geography ==
According to the United States Census Bureau, the city has an area of 8.72 square miles (22.58 km^{2}), of which 7.91 square miles (20.49 km^{2}) is land and 0.81 square miles (2.10 km^{2}) is water.

== Demographics ==
Historical population
Census	Pop.	Note	%±
1980	3,843		—
1990	7,400		92.6%
2000	10,169		37.4%
2010	14,545		43.0%
2020	16,707		14.9%
U.S. Decennial Census

=== 2020 census ===
As of the 2020 census, Lake St. Louis had a population of 16,707, with 6,854 households and 4,819 families. The population density was 1,956.3 per square mile (755.3/km^{2}).

The median age was 44.3 years. 20.5% of residents were under the age of 18 and 21.7% of residents were 65 years of age or older. For every 100 females there were 96.9 males, and for every 100 females age 18 and over there were 95.0 males age 18 and over.

100.0% of residents lived in urban areas, while 0.0% lived in rural areas.

There were 7,422 housing units, of which 7.7% were vacant. The homeowner vacancy rate was 2.3% and the rental vacancy rate was 14.7%. Among households, 28.4% had children under the age of 18 living in them. Of all households, 57.7% were married-couple households, 14.7% were households with a male householder and no spouse or partner present, and 22.4% were households with a female householder and no spouse or partner present. About 24.6% of all households were made up of individuals and 10.7% had someone living alone who was 65 years of age or older. The average household size was 2.5 and the average family size was 2.9.

Racial composition as of the 2020 census
Race	Number	Percent
White	14,343	85.9%
Black or African American	724	4.3%
American Indian and Alaska Native	62	0.4%
Asian	406	2.4%
Native Hawaiian and Other Pacific Islander	7	0.0%
Some other race	179	1.1%
Two or more races	986	5.9%
Hispanic or Latino (of any race)	530	3.2%

=== Income and poverty ===
The 2016–2020 five-year American Community Survey estimates show that the median household income was $100,122 (with a margin of error of $8,120) and the median family income was $117,276 (+/- $10,025). Males had a median income of $58,692 (+/- $8,029) versus $40,932 (+/- $11,727) for females. The median income for those above 16 years old was $51,264 (+/- $2,532). About 4.7% of families and 3.9% of the population were below the poverty line, including 2.1% of those under the age of 18 and 7.2% of those ages 65 or over.

=== 2010 census ===
As of the census of 2010, there were 14,545 people, 5,816 households, and 4,213 families residing in the city. The population density was 1,838.8 inhabitants per square mile (710.0/km^{2}). There were 6,197 housing units at an average density of 783.4 per square mile (302.5/km^{2}). The racial makeup of the city was 92.2% White, 3.8% African American, 0.3% Native American, 2.1% Asian, 0.1% Pacific Islander, 0.3% from other races, and 1.1% from two or more races. Hispanic or Latino of any race were 2.1% of the population.

There were 5,816 households, of which 31.5% had children under the age of 18 living with them, 60.8% were married couples living together, 7.8% had a female householder with no husband present, 3.8% had a male householder with no wife present, and 27.6% were non-families. 22.2% of all households were made up of individuals, and 7.4% had someone living alone who was 65 years of age or older. The average household size was 2.50 and the average family size was 2.94.

The median age in the city was 41.3 years. 23.4% of residents were under the age of 18; 7.1% were between the ages of 18 and 24; 24.6% were from 25 to 44; 29% were from 45 to 64; and 16% were 65 years of age or older. The gender makeup of the city was 49.5% male and 50.5% female.

=== 2000 census ===
Per the census of 2000, it is estimated there were 13,708 people, 3,923 households, and 3,005 families residing in the city. The population density was 1,359.3 inhabitants per square mile (524.8/km^{2}). There were 4,133 housing units at an average density of 552.4 per square mile (213.3/km^{2}). The racial makeup of the city was 95.60% White, 1.84% African American, 0.25% Native American, 0.97% Asian, 0.04% Pacific Islander, 0.40% from other races, and 0.89% from two or more races. Hispanic or Latino of any race were 1.35% of the population.

There were 3,923 households, out of which 32.4% had children under the age of 18 living with them, 68.0% were married couples living together, 6.4% had a female householder with no husband present, and 23.4% were non-families. 18.5% of all households were made up of individuals, and 4.9% had someone living alone who was 65 years of age or older. The average household size was 2.59 and the average family size was 2.97.

In the city, the population was spread out, with 24.5% under the age of 18, 6.8% from 18 to 24, 27.3% from 25 to 44, 29.6% from 45 to 64, and 11.8% who were 65 years of age or older. The median age was 40 years. For every 100 females, there were 98.1 males. For every 100 females age 18 and over, there were 95.0 males.

The median income for a household in the city was $68,830, and the median income for a family was $80,700. Males had a median income of $57,201 versus $30,335 for females. The per capita income was $32,064. About 2.1% of families and 3.9% of the population were below the poverty line, including 6.9% of those under age 18 and 4.5% of those age 65 or over.

== Education ==
The residents of all portions of Lake St. Louis are part of the Wentzville R-IV School District.

Green Tree Elementary School is in Lake St. Louis. Duello Elementary School is adjacent to the Lake St. Louis city limits. A portion of Lake St. Louis is zoned to Lakeview Elementary School in Wentzville.

Parts of Lake St. Louis are zoned to South Middle School and Timberland High School, Wentzville Middle School and Holt High School, and Frontier Middle School and Liberty High School.

Liberty High School is in O'Fallon but has a Lake St. Louis postal address.

== Economy ==
=== Top employers ===
According to the Lake St. Louis Comprehensive Annual Financial Report for the fiscal year ended June 30, 2018, its top employers were:

#	Employer	# of Employees
1	SSM St. Joseph Hospital West	908
2	National Information Solutions Cooperative (NISC)	553
3	Medical Transportation Management (MTM)	500
4	Walmart	353
5	Schnucks	145
6	Wentzville R-IV School District	130
7	Lowe's	115
8	Von Maur	98
9	City of Lake St. Louis	94
9	American Poolplayers Association (APA)	63

=== Commercial development ===
In 2004, Schnucks opened a store on the city's previously undeveloped south side, at the intersection of I-64 and Lake St. Louis Boulevard, beginning a period of rapid retail and commercial growth for the city. This was the first new retail development the city had seen in 17 years. The National Information Solutions Cooperative (NISC) also announced plans to build its $18 million 135,000-square-foot headquarters near the same intersection in 2004. Development of two large retail districts in the city followed: The Shoppes at Hawk Ridge and The Meadows at Lake St. Louis. Before 2004, the city had very little commercial development. Residents of the lakeside community traveled to Wentzville or O'Fallon for most shopping, dining, and other services.

==== The Shoppes at Hawk Ridge ====
Bounded by I-64 to the north, South Fox Hound Drive to the east, and Hawk Ridge Trail to the South, the Shoppes at Hawk Ridge is an 800,000 sq ft (74,000 m2) retail development on the south side of Lake St. Louis. The development was spurred by the new $26 million Hwy N overpass completed in 2005, which eventually became part of the Page Avenue extension. The development was the largest retail project in St. Charles County at the time of its construction, and opened in 2006. The Hawk Ridge development is anchored by several big-box and numerous smaller retailers and restaurants. Some businesses had to abandon their standard store designs and color schemes to comply with the development's style.

==== The Meadows at Lake St. Louis ====
The second major retail development that anchors the Lake St. Louis retail district is The Meadows at Lake St. Louis. Opened in 2008, the Meadows is an open-air shopping district geared toward the community's affluent residents. It was developed to meet the growing demand for specialty stores and restaurants in St. Charles County, and was billed as the county's first lifestyle center. It has two landscaped boulevards in a downtown street grid surrounded by 500,000 sq ft (46,000 m2) of restaurants and various specialty retail stores. The retail portion of the development is anchored by department store Von Maur. Kansas City-based Ferguson Properties also plans to build a 110- to 120-room Marriott or Hilton hotel geared toward business travelers as part of the lifestyle center. The Meadows is on 64 acres (26 ha) on the north side of I-64 near Lake St. Louis Boulevard.

== Notable people ==
- Chingy (born 1980), rapper
- Jud Birza, winner of Survivor: Nicaragua
- Don Coryell (1924–2010), American football coach
- Jonathan Dolan (born 1967), politician
- Nelly (born 1974), rapper
- Shaun Murray, wakeboarder
- Cal Neeman (1929–2015), baseball player
- Bob Onder (born 1962), politician
- Dave Phillips (born 1943), baseball umpire
