= Disappearance of Bianca Piper =

Unsolved 2005 disappearance in Missouri, US

Bianca Piper
- Born: Bianca Noel Piper; December 26, 1991; Foley, Missouri, U.S.
- Disappeared: March 10, 2005 (aged 13); Foley, Missouri, U.S.
- Status: Missing for 21 years, 5 months and 2 days
- Height: 5 ft 6 in (1.68 m)

Bianca Noel Piper (December 26, 1991 – disappeared March 10, 2005) is an American missing person who disappeared at the age of 13 in Foley, Missouri, on March 10, 2005. She is believed to have been abducted, though her fate and whereabouts remain unknown.

== Background ==
Bianca Noel Piper was born in Foley, Missouri, on December 26, 1991. During her early childhood, she was hospitalized due to her ADHD and severe bipolar disorder. Piper required daily medications to prevent disorientation and hallucinations.

At the time of her disappearance, Piper was attending the eighth grade at Winfield Middle School. She was in special education classes due to her short attention span and repeated absences.

Prior to Piper's disappearance, her therapist had recommended that her mother drive her a certain distance from home and have her walk back on her own, giving Piper time to deal with her own aggression.

== Disappearance ==
On the evening of March 10, 2005, Piper and her mother had a dispute over doing dinner dishes. Although it was snowing that night, Piper, having found the activity her therapist recommended helpful, requested that it be done again, wanting her mother to drop her off at a further distance from home than ever before. Piper was last seen around 6:15 p.m. that evening, when her mother dropped her off at McIntosh Hill Road in Foley, approximately one mile from their home.

At the time of her disappearance, Piper was wearing a lime-green blouse, a gray Adidas hooded sweatshirt, blue jeans, and white tennis sneakers. She also had a flashlight in her possession.

Hours later, when Piper still had not returned home, her mother reported her missing at 8:20 p.m.

== Investigation and developments ==
Although investigators initially believed that Piper had simply gotten lost on her way back home, following an extensive search, authorities came to believe that she had been abducted. Piper had no prior history of running away from home.

Piper's mother passed a polygraph test, as did her mother's live-in boyfriend. Her biological father was also extensively interviewed. No one in Piper's family is considered a suspect in her disappearance.

The Lincoln County Sheriff's Department searched for Piper via horseback, four-wheelers, and search dogs.

In 2007, a multi-jurisdictional task force was created to investigate Michael J. Devlin for a possible connection to Piper's disappearance – as well as those of several other children, including 9-year-old Scott Allen Kleeschulte in 1988 and 11-year-old Charles Arlin Henderson in 1991 – after two missing teenagers, 15-year-old Shawn Hornbeck and 13-year-old Ben Ownby, were discovered alive in Devlin's apartment in Kirkwood, Missouri. Hornbeck had been abducted in Richwoods in 2002, while Ownby had been abducted in Beaufort four days before Devlin's arrest. A Lincoln County detective believed that Devlin was at least aware of the search for Piper, stating: "Whether he was a part of it, in it, or in the middle, or just watching from afar, he absolutely knew what was going on. I certainly believe Michael Devlin was monitoring our search and the disappearance of Bianca Piper." The task force was dissolved in October 2007, having not found any evidence that Devlin was involved with Piper's disappearance, nor the disappearances of any other children.

On February 3, 2023, a septic tank near where Piper was last seen was drained. The Lincoln County Sheriff's Department is working with Othram, a forensic genealogy company, in an effort to solve Piper's case.

In 2025, the Lincoln County Sheriff’s Office initiated a "comprehensive, new investigation" into Piper's disappearance, utilizing new advances in forensic science. Chief Deputy Wade O'Heron also stated that new interviews and another search would be conducted soon.

== Aftermath ==
Piper's father died in 2009. Her mother now lives in St. Charles, Missouri. The investigation into Piper's disappearance remains open, though it is now considered a cold case. Piper's case is one of two active missing person cases in Lincoln County, alongside that of Charles Arlin Henderson, who disappeared in Moscow Mills, Missouri, on July 25, 1991, at the age of 11.

In September 2014, Piper's sister, 24-year-old Tiffany Piper, was sentenced to eight years in prison for trafficking two suburban high school girls in June 2012. According to a prosecutor from St. Charles County, Missouri, Tiffany was initially a victim of human trafficking as well, though she refused to reveal by whom. Tiffany's accomplice, Demond Day, was sentenced in April 2014 to five years in prison.

As of January 2026, the Amber alert for Bianca Piper remained active.

== See also ==
- List of people who disappeared mysteriously (2000–present)
