= Western Missouri Correctional Center =

Former Prison in Missouri

Coordinates: 39°45′51″N 94°13′22″W

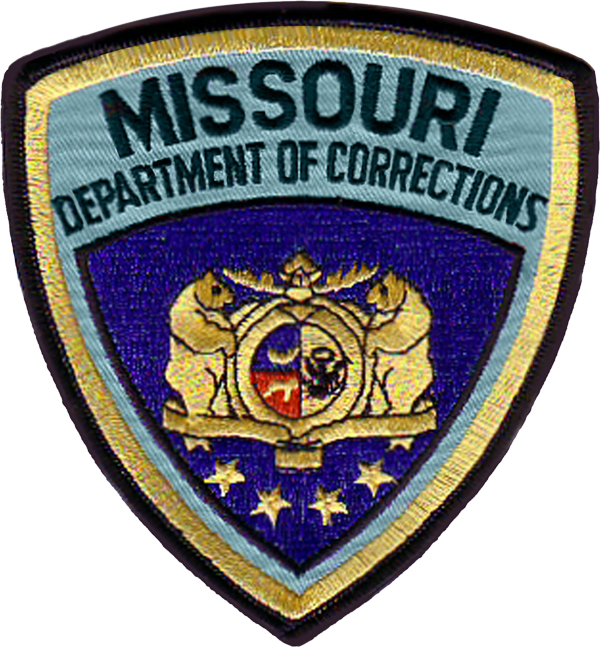
- Interactive map of Western Missouri Correctional Center
- Location: Cameron, DeKalb County, Missouri
- Status: Closed
- Security class: Medium, Maximum
- Capacity: 1,975
- Opened: 1988
- Closed: 2022
- Managed by: Missouri Department of Corrections
- Director: Anne L. Precythe
- Governor: Mike Parson
- Warden: Christopher Brewer
- Website: Official website

Western Missouri Correctional Center (WMCC) was a Missouri Department of Corrections state prison for men located in Cameron, DeKalb County, Missouri. (The town of Cameron straddles DeKalb and Clinton Counties.) According to the Official Manual State of Missouri the facility had a capacity of 1925 medium security prisoners.

The facility was converted into a training academy for all staff within the Missouri Department of Corrections in 2024. The facility is now titled the Academy for Excellence in Corrections. Facility utilizes former offender spaces for education, physical training, dining, and housing of trainees from across the state.

The facility opened in 1988 and is immediately adjacent to the Crossroads Correctional Center (CRCC), a maximum security facility for men which opened in 1997. Crossroads was closed in July 2019 and one side of WMCC was converted into a maximum security prison, receiving many of those formerly held at CRCC.

== Notable inmates ==
- Michael J. Devlin - kidnapper and child molester
- Lorenzo Gilyard - serial killer
- Clifton Ray - serial killer
