= Wayne DuMond =

American murderer and rapist (1949–2005)

- Born: Wayne Eugene DuMond; September 10, 1949; DeWitt, Arkansas, U.S.
- Died: August 31, 2005 (aged 55); Crossroads Correctional Center, Cameron, Missouri, U.S.
- Convictions: Missouri; First degree murder Arkansas; Kidnapping; Rape
- Penalty: Missouri; Life imprisonment Arkansas; Life imprisonment; commuted to 39.5 years imprisonment

Wayne Eugene DuMond (September 10, 1949 – August 31, 2005) was an American serial killer convicted of murder and rape.

DuMond's life sentence for a rape conviction received intense nationwide attention in late 2007, when his parole became an issue for presidential candidate Mike Huckabee during the 2008 presidential campaign. Lois Davidson, mother of DuMond rape/murder victim Carol Sue Shields, appeared in a one-minute video entitled "Lois Davidson tells her story" which was posted on YouTube. The commercial attacked Huckabee's efforts to get DuMond released from prison early.

DuMond was a soldier in the Vietnam War and worked as a handyman and carpenter in communities around DeWitt and Forrest City and in Texas. A decorated military veteran, DuMond told reporters that he "helped slaughter a village of Cambodians". On August 8, 1972, DuMond was charged with murder in Lawton, Oklahoma. He committed the crime with help from two other men.

DuMond used the 17-year-old daughter of one of his accomplices to entice the victim to an isolated location, where DuMond and his accomplices beat him to death with a claw hammer. Prosecutors did not charge DuMond after he agreed to testify against the two others, though he admitted in court that he was among those who attacked the murder victim.

On October 19, 1973, DuMond was charged with molesting a teenage girl in the parking lot of a shopping center in Tacoma, Washington. The second-degree assault charge resulted in a five-year deferred sentence and mandatory drug counseling during the five-year probation. On September 28, 1976, DuMond was charged with raping a woman in DeWitt, Arkansas. The charges were dropped before trial with the condition he undergo counseling.

== Arkansas rape ==
DuMond received his second sexual assault conviction from a rape perpetrated in Forrest City, Arkansas in 1984. The victim, Ashley Stevens, was a 17-year-old cheerleader and a third cousin of then-Governor Bill Clinton.

In March 1985, after his arrest but before his trial, DuMond claimed he was attacked in his home by two men and castrated. No arrests were made in the incident. Phil Ostermann, the Arkansas State Police investigator who handled the castration case, noted in his report that Dr. Jeff Whitfield of the Elvis Presley Trauma Center in Memphis examined DuMond after the incident, and was asked by DuMond's wife whether it was possible the castration was self-inflicted. Whitfield responded that it was possible, and he had noted similar cases of self-mutilation in the past. Fletcher Long, the attorney who prosecuted DuMond for the rape of Ashley Stevens, was skeptical that DuMond could have castrated himself, but he also doubted DuMond's account because there was no evidence of a struggle, or that he had been tied up (which should have left ligature marks), and there was a two-thirds-empty half-gallon bottle of Jim Beam whiskey at the scene of the supposed assault.

While in prison, DuMond successfully sued the St. Francis County and Sheriff Coolidge Conlee, who publicly displayed DuMond's severed testicles and later flushed them down the toilet. DuMond was sentenced to life plus 20 years in prison.

After Clinton was elected president, a right-wing campaign alleged that Clinton had framed DuMond for rape.

Prominent among those pushing for DuMond to be pardoned were Guy Reel, author of Unequal Justice: Wayne DuMond, Bill Clinton, and the Politics of Rape in Arkansas; Steve Dunleavy of the New York Post; and Jay Cole, Baptist pastor for the Mission Fellowship Bible Church in Fayetteville, who had championed DuMond's cause for more than a decade on his radio show.

Many of the arguments advanced by DuMond's supporters have since been shown to be incorrect. Dunleavy claimed that:

- DuMond was a "Vietnam veteran with no record" – despite arrests for violent crime and previous rape charges going back to 1972.
- The rape victim "failed to identify DuMond in two lineups" – although she had in fact identified him in the only lineup where he was present.
- The victim had "identified two other suspects, one an ex-boyfriend" – although she had never in fact identified anyone but DuMond.
- DNA evidence had exonerated DuMond – although no such definitive evidence existed.
- Bill Clinton had personally intervened to keep DuMond in prison – despite the then-Governor's explicitly recusing himself from the case due to his distant blood-ties to the 17-year-old victim.

Dunleavy also referred to the young woman, a minor at the time of the assault, as the "so-called victim", and asserted "that rape never happened".

At the time of the trial, only ABO blood typing evidence was presented, which indicated that DuMond, along with 28 percent of the population, could have produced the semen. In 1987 the victim's jeans were given to an expert, Dr. Moses Schanfield. Using protein-based immunoglobulin allotyping, a technique less specific than current standard DNA tests, Schanfield examined a semen spot on the jeans. Dunleavy claimed Schanfield told him, "No way, zip, nada. No way DuMond was the donor of that sperm. Not in a million years." However, the court documents do not accord with that. In DuMond vs. Lockhart, the Court wrote:

Dr. Schanfield had genetic allotyping performed on the semen found on the victim's pant leg. Schanfield concluded that based on the test, there was a ninety-nine plus percent probability that DuMond was not the rapist because the semen lacked a genetic marker which DuMond possessed. However, Dr. Schanfield's conclusion was based on the assumption that vaginal fluids were not mixed with the semen used for the test. If the semen was intermixed with vaginal secretions, Dr. Schanfield reported that the results would be inconclusive.

The victim had testified that DuMond raped her vaginally, then forced her to perform oral sex during which time he ejaculated, then brief vaginal rape again. She had also testified that she spat the ejaculate from her mouth onto the ground, and that her jeans were underneath her body, not near her face.

Contrary to Dunleavy's claim that the victim had first identified two other men as her rapist, then failed to pick DuMond out of a lineup, the Court wrote in the background to its DuMond vs. Lockhart decision:

During a photographic show-up, the victim indicated that Ricky White resembled the assailant. However, White was working in another part of the state on the day of the rape, and she did not identify him as the rapist at a one-person lineup. Later, Walter Stevenson, who matched the assailant's description and worked near a restaurant which the victim frequented, was placed in a lineup. She did not identify Stevenson as her assailant. Woodcutters working near the area of her home on the date of the rape were also brought in for lineups but none were recognized by the victim. On approximately October 29, 1984, the victim observed DuMond driving a pick-up truck on a Forrest City street and immediately identified him as the perpetrator of the crime. DuMond was taken into custody, placed in a lineup, and identified by her as the man who kidnapped and raped her.

The victim would later tell Governor Mike Huckabee, in a personal meeting at which she, her family, and the prosecuting attorney in the case pleaded with him to reverse his decision to release DuMond, "This is how close I was to Wayne DuMond. I will never forget his face. And now I don't want you ever to forget my face."

== Arkansas parole controversy ==
According to the Washington Post's "Fact Checker" column, in September 1990 then-governor Bill Clinton overrode a recommendation of the Arkansas parole board to commute DuMond's sentence to time already served, arguing that "...the issue should be left to an appeals court." The DuMond case:

... became a cause celebre among some evangelical Christians in Arkansas after DuMond claimed to have undergone a religious conversion. DuMond's supporters argued that he was not being treated fairly because one of his alleged victims was a distant cousin of Bill Clinton. They accused Clinton, then governor of Arkansas, of preventing DuMond's release from prison in defiance of the wishes of his own parole board.

When Clinton was campaigning for president in 1992, his lieutenant governor Jim Guy Tucker became the acting governor of Arkansas. Tucker reviewed DuMond's life-plus-20-years sentence. Because the jury had not been allowed to take DuMond's castration into consideration, Tucker commuted the sentence down to slightly over 39 years. This clemency meant that DuMond would eventually be considered for parole. When Huckabee became governor, he supported the release of DuMond, with one state official stating "The problem with the governor is that he listens to Jay Cole and reads Steve Dunleavy and believes them ... without doing other substantiative work." Huckabee, addressing DuMond as "Dear Wayne," wrote to DuMond in January 1997: "My desire is that you be released from prison."

The board's executive session appears to have been a violation of the state's Freedom of Information Act, which says state boards may meet privately only for the "specific purpose of considering employment, appointment, promotion, demotion, disciplining or resignation of any public officer or employee.

Despite the fact that the meeting was closed, there still should have been a record of it, four former board members and a former staffer say. They say that Sharon Hansberry, the board's office administrator, ordinarily attends the meeting and takes notes. It was also a common practice around that time, they say, for her to tape record the meetings as well, even though the tapes were often destroyed once the minutes were formalized. Former members of the board say that Hansberry was asked to leave the room when the board went into executive session. A spokesman for the board says that there is no record of what occurred in the executive session – no tape recording of the executive session, or notes, or minutes.

As of December 2007, six of the seven Democratic-appointed board members involved were still living. Board chairman Leroy Brownlee said he had no comment. Another board member said he did not remember details of the case. Another member could not be reached. Two more of the five members who were present at the closed meeting with Huckabee – Charles Chastain and Deborah Suttlar – have stated on the record that Huckabee used the private session to strongly advocate DuMond's parole. Huckabee denies their version, though he admits having met with them.

The sixth member of the board still living, Ermer Pondexter, who was absent from the meeting, has stated that Brownlee asked her, on the governor's behalf, to vote for DuMond's parole. This represented a reversal of Brownlee's positions of August 29, 1996, when he voted against parole, and September 10, 1996, when he voted against recommending executive clemency or pardon. Brownlee would later be reappointed to another seven-year term on the board by Huckabee.

A fourth parole board member (in addition to Chastain, Suttlar, and Pondexter) confirmed this story anonymously in 2002 and has not yet been identified by name in the 2007–2008 news cycle. Huckabee denies the version given by Chastain, Suttlar, Pondexter, and the anonymous fourth member, though he admits having met with the parole board and talking about DuMond.

== Missouri crimes ==
Following his 1999 parole, DuMond moved to Smithville, Missouri in August 2000, where he married Terry Sue, a member of a church group who visited him while he was incarcerated in Arkansas. On June 22, 2001, DuMond was arrested and charged with the September 20, 2000, rape and murder of Carol Sue Shields of Parkville. DuMond was convicted in the summer of 2003.

He was found dead in his cell at the Crossroads Correctional Center in Cameron, Missouri, on September 1, 2005. DuMond had been suffering from cancer of the vocal cords. At the time of his death, charges were being prepared, but had not yet been filed, for the June 21, 2001, rape and murder of Sara Andrasek, who was in the early stages of pregnancy.

== DuMond in the 2008 presidential campaign ==
Wayne DuMond was the focus of a video which was called "devastating" and "absolutely brutal".

The video spread quickly on the Internet, after appearing on YouTube in the early morning hours of December 13, 2007. It was almost immediately compared to the famous Willie Horton ad of 1988. As one political website put it, "You know how most campaign ads have a shelf life of a day or two? Yeah, um … this one may be around for awhile [sic]."

Initially, there was uncertainty about who had created the video. Due to its professional quality, some speculated that it was one of Huckabee's opponents, possibly John McCain.

Keith Emis said that he made the professional quality video with "no expenses, save gas and video tapes, and used friends as volunteer help, including one with video production experience. His uncle Donn Emis, a Fayetteville DJ, did the voiceover."

=== Marriage and children ===
DuMond had six children and three wives. His second wife, Dusty, staunchly supported him throughout his imprisonment in Arkansas, but died in a car crash January 8, 1999, after the approval of his parole but prior to the approval of his release plan.

His final wife was Terry Sue.

== See also ==
- Willie Horton - a controversial work furlough under Michael Dukakis
- Maurice Clemmons - the other controversial clemency granted by Mike Huckabee
- List of serial killers in the United States
