= Shark (American TV series) =

American legal drama television series

- Genre: Legal drama
- Created by: Ian Biederman
- Starring: James Woods; Danielle Panabaker; Sophina Brown; Sarah Carter; Kevin Alejandro; Henry Simmons; Jeri Ryan
- Composer: Sean Callery
- Country of origin: United States
- Original language: English
- No. of seasons: 2
- No. of episodes: 38

Production
- Executive producers: Ian Biederman; Brian Grazer; David Nevins
- Running time: 43 minutes
- Production companies: Imagine Television; Deforestation Services; 20th Century Fox Television

Original release
- Network: CBS
- Release: September 21, 2006 – May 20, 2008

Shark is an American legal drama television series created by Ian Biederman that originally aired on CBS from September 21, 2006, to May 20, 2008. The series stars James Woods. On May 10, 2008, CBS cancelled the series after two seasons.

== Synopsis ==
The show revolves around Sebastian Stark (Woods), a notorious Los Angeles defense attorney who becomes disillusioned with his career after his successful defense of a wife-abuser results in the wife's death. After more than a month trying to come to grips with his situation, he is invited by the Los Angeles district attorney to become a public prosecutor so he can apply his unorthodox-but-effective talents to putting guilty people away instead of putting them back on the street. Stark's relationship with the Los Angeles District Attorney's office, his staff, and his daughter, forms the central plot for the series.

== Cast and characters ==
=== Main ===
- James Woods as Deputy DA Sebastian Stark, the protagonist of the series and head of the mayor's special unit. At the beginning he is not satisfied with his new job and does not get along well with his team; but he gets used to the new circumstances relatively quickly and is also almost unbeatable as a public prosecutor.
- Jeri Ryan as Jessica Devlin, the district attorney, and Stark's supervisor, in the show's first season. Initially, she is opposed to Stark as a prosecutor; over time she comes to terms with him and works reasonably well with him. She does not always agree with Stark's methods. In the second season, after her failed reelection, she is a deputy DA and member of Stark's team.
- Danielle Panabaker as Julie Stark, Sebastian Stark's daughter. Because her parents divorced, she moved in with her after her custody hearing, because "he needs her more than he'll ever know." Her mother went to New York City with her new partner.
- Sarah Carter as Deputy DA Madeleine Poe, a prosecutor who in the first episode joins Stark's special unit voluntarily to learn from him. She had the highest conviction rate of the entire DA's office in the last two years prior to the show's start, and is arguably the best lawyer of Stark's original team.
- Sophina Brown as Deputy DA Raina Troy, a prosecutor. Troy is passionate, smart and tough and described by Stark as "brilliant" but "a contempt citation waiting to happen." Midway through the first season she begins a relationship with Stark's investigator Isaac Wright.
- Samuel Page as Deputy DA Richard Casey Woodland (season 1) is a prosecutor thanks to his father, a senator, gaving him the post. Only Jessica Devlin knows about it and blackmails him in the third episode so he has to provide her with information about Stark's contacts. A young, handsome lawyer from an influential family, Casey finds himself having to prove his worth to those who think he bought his way into the job. He begins a sexual relationship with Madeline Poe despite their disdain for each other. He leaves the team at the end of the first season to devote himself to his father's election campaign.
- Alexis Cruz as Deputy DA Martin Allende (season 1) is a prosecutor. In the eleventh episode, he rescues a girl in a shootout but gets shot and dies.
- Henry Simmons as DA Investigator Isaac Wright (guest in the second episode; main, from the eighth episode of season 1) is a former police officer who was dismissed for false testimony. He takes Stark's offer to work for him as an investigator, after much hesitation. Over time he establishes a relationship with Raina.
- Kevin Alejandro as Deputy DA Danny Reyes (season 2) is a prosecutor. He joins the team in the first episode of the second season. Previously, he worked in the Department of Organized Crime in L.A., primarily with Eastern European gangs. He had the highest conviction rate among his peers in his six-year career. At first he dislikes Stark, but quickly learns to appreciate him.

=== Recurring ===
- Carlos Gómez as Manuel "Manny" Delgado is the acting mayor. In the first episode, he persuades Stark to change to the prosecutor. Nevertheless, he sometimes opposes him to enforce his own interests.
- Billy Campbell as Wayne Robert Callison, a ruthless serial killer, creative writing teacher and Stark's personal nemesis throughout season 1. He targeted emotionally damaged women in their 20s and tortured them to death by cutting them. After he is acquitted, Stark becomes obsessed with putting him behind bars.
- Shaun Sipos as Trevor Boyd (season 2), Julie's boyfriend
- Kevin Pollak as Leo Cutler (season 2), the new district attorney and thus Stark's superior. He won the elections against Jessica Devlin and has since held her post. Stark and he dislike each other from the beginning—Stark considers him an "incompetent ass crawler" in his own words.
- Paula Marshall as Jordan Westlake (season 2), a young and driven state prosecutor who helps Stark when Jessica has to leave town to help her ill father.

== Broadcast history ==
The show first aired in the 10:00 p.m., Eastern Thursday night slot. On October 20, 2006, it was announced that CBS had picked up the show for a full 22-episode season. CBS announced on May 16, 2007 that Shark would return for a second season to consist of 18 episodes, but due to the writer's strike, it was shortened to 16 episodes.

In Shark's second season, it moved to Sunday night at 10:00 p.m., switching time slots with Without a Trace and thereby competing against another highly rated series, ABC's Brothers & Sisters. In Canada, Global had also picked up Brothers & Sisters, so they decided to keep Shark on Thursday 10 p.m. time slot, three days ahead of the CBS broadcast (except for the Season 2 premiere), and Brothers & Sisters for their Sunday night 10 p.m. time slot.

The show returned on April 29, 2008, in a new time slot at 9:00 p.m. to air the four remaining post-strike episodes. CBS officially cancelled the series on May 13, 2008.

== Filming locations ==
Shark was filmed mostly in and around Hollywood and Los Angeles in California. Many Hollywood landmarks can be seen including Hollywood Boulevard and the Hollywood Hills. There were roof top scenes shot at the Hollywood Roosevelt Hotel, and exterior and interior shots at the Vibe Hotel, both located on Hollywood Boulevard.

== Ratings ==
Season	Time slot (EDT)	Season Premiere	Season Finale	TV Season	Rank	Rating
1	Thursday 10:00 P.M.	September 21, 2006	May 3, 2007	2006–2007	#20	8.7 (Tied with 60 Minutes)
2	Sunday 10:00 P.M. Tuesday 9:00 P.M.	September 23, 2007	May 20, 2008	2007–2008	#30	7.0 (Tied with The Unit and Hell's Kitchen)

== Home media ==
DVD name	Release date	Ep #	Additional information
Season 1	October 2, 2007	22	2 Commentary Tracks, "Creating Shark" Featurette, Deleted Scenes, Gag Reel.

== Syndication ==
Shark began airing on Ion in early 2010, in a Sunday 10 pm to midnight slot, but was soon removed.

== International airings ==
In Australia Shark started airing season 2 at 10 p.m. on Thursdays from November 12, 2009, on Seven's new digital channel 7TWO. Season 2 and the series overall completed its first run airing on W on Friday, December 18.

In the United Kingdom, Shark was shown at 11 a.m. every weekday on Channel 5.

== Episodes ==
Season	Episodes	Originally released		Rank	Rating
Season	Episodes	First released	Last released	Rank	Rating
1	22	September 21, 2006	May 3, 2007	20	8.7 (Note: Tied with 60 Minutes)
2	16	September 23, 2007	May 20, 2008	30	7.0 (Note: Tied with The Unit and Hell's Kitchen)

=== Season 1 (2006–07) ===
No. overall	No. in season	Title	Directed by	Written by	Original release date	Prod. code	Viewers (millions)
1	1	"Pilot"	Spike Lee	Ian Biederman	September 21, 2006	1AMK79	14.74
After a shocking outcome in one of his cases and a personal epiphany, Sebastian Stark decides to leave his job as a defense attorney. After 3 months of battling depression, he has been offered the position of director of the Los Angeles DA's high-profile crime unit, but with a twist—he will have to train a new team of inexperienced lawyers. Their first case proves to be trouble when a combination of lack of prep-work and Stark's loss of drive almost sinks them.
2	2	"LAPD Blue"	Rod Holcomb	Ian Biederman	September 28, 2006	1AMK01	14.64
Stark has a new case, the murder of an undercover narcotics detective by a drug dealer. He will have to deal with the murdered cop's partners, who are hesitant to trust or help him because he often used questionable means to win acquittals for his often-guilty clients when he was a defense attorney.
3	3	"Dr. Feelbad"	John Showalter	Keith Eisner	October 5, 2006	1AMK02	13.75
A heart surgeon is accused of murdering his missing wife. The fact that Stark doesn't have any proof, or even a body, doesn't stop him. He asks his team to find creative means to secure evidence from Dr. Mitchell Sterling's home and obtain testimony from his eight-year-old son, Ethan.
4	4	"Russo"	Ron Lagomarsino	Kevin Falls	October 12, 2006	1AMK03	14.15
A couple is shot to death in a Malibu beach house, which they rented from a private investigator who knows dirty secrets about almost everyone in Hollywood—including Shark. The PI is under investigation by a grand jury and Stark uses that threat to squeeze information from him. Back at home, Julie helps a guy on whom she has a crush research a term paper while she lets her own studies fall behind. This episode is inspired by the Anthony Pellicano case.
5	5	"In the Grasp"	Steven DePaul	Devon Greggory	October 19, 2006	1AMK04	13.71
Stark prosecutes three college football players accused of raping a female student at a campus athletic house. One of the players is the team's starting quarterback and is considered a high first-round pick in the upcoming NFL draft. The case takes a hit when Shark learns the victim was in a relationship with the quarterback. Back at home, Julie tells her dad she is being suspended from school because she's been accused of plagiarism. This episode is inspired by the Duke lacrosse case.
6	6	"Fashion Police"	Arvin Brown	Bill Chais	November 2, 2006	1AMK05	13.31
Four Latino women are killed in a garment-factory fire and the police rule it an accident, but Martin leaks false information to the press to force the DA's office to investigate. Sebastian isn't happy about it and says the case can't be won, but he gets pumped up when he learns his rival, Elliott Dasher is defending the fashion company his office is going after. The probe reveals the company supports sweatshops and may be liable for the fire. Also, Julie gets readmitted to school.
7	7	"Déjà Vu All Over Again"	Rod Holcomb	Michael Oates Palmer	November 9, 2006	1AMK06	13.64
After an 8-year-old girl is kidnapped from a park and murdered, Stark believes this new case could be linked to a similar crime committed 15 years ago. In the former case, the main suspect had been defended by Stark himself and prosecuted by Jessica Devlin, and the man had been convicted of the murder. Meanwhile, a young man tells Julie he believes his late father and her mother had an affair while she was still married to Stark.
8	8	"Love Triangle"	John Showalter	Story by : Mimi Schmir; Teleplay by : Ian Biederman	November 16, 2006	1AMK07	15.24
A 16-year-old black girl is run down by a car and killed just after she left a party. The school the victim went to is mostly attended by rich, white kids, including Stark's daughter, Julie. To help the case, Stark approaches Isaac Wright (The LAPD Detective from Episode 2) to join the team as an Investigator. Shark fears a racial war could break out over the crime but when the investigation is completed, it reveals a totally different story.
9	9	"Dial M for Monica"	Steve Gomer	Ian Biederman	November 23, 2006	1AMK08	12.41
An assistant district attorney is gunned down along with a high-priced hooker in the prostitute's car. The investigation reports the victim had wanted to prosecute narcotics cases and not domestic disputes, and he may have been working the call girl on targeting a drug dealer with whom she had a relationship. Meanwhile, Julie considers going to the next step with Eddie.
10	10	"Sins of the Mother"	Robert Lieberman	Yolanda Lawrence	December 7, 2006	1AMK09	13.98
A married socialite, who is one of Jessica's best friends, fatally shoots her ex-con lover but claims it was in self-defense. Also, Sebastian gives Julie the silent treatment after she stays overnight with her boyfriend.
11	11	"The Wrath of Khan"	Kate Woods	Keith Eisner	January 4, 2007	1AMK10	14.41
Stark goes after a millionaire arms broker who is supplying explosives to L.A. gangs that have caused three car bombings and nine fatalities over the past five months. Making things more difficult are a compromised cop working with the prosecutors; and, the FBI, which wants to take over the case, but Sebastian won't allow it because Casey has been kidnapped and may be killed if the broker escapes the country. Martin dies tragically while trying to save a little girl.
12	12	"Wayne's World"	Chris Misiano	Story by : Bill Chais; Teleplay by : Ian Biederman	January 18, 2007	1AMK11	15.09
Sebastian's new case seems to be the easiest one he could get. He's prosecuting a suspected serial killer accused of murdering five women and seriously injuring a sixth who was lucky enough to escape from his house. But the victim is reluctant to testify when she learns that the killer will be interrogating her, the bodies of his five previous victims are discovered on his brother's property, and the suspect---having admired and studied Stark's legal career---becomes his own defense attorney playing the blame-the-victims card.
13	13	"Teacher's Pet"	Rod Holcomb	Bill Chais & Kevin Falls	February 1, 2007	1AMK12	14.08
Shark and the HPCU take on the murder of a billionaire real estate developer whose marriage to his second wife is in trouble. The billionaire's son and wife are both suspects in the bizarre killing---as is the son's comely art teacher whose encouragement of the boy's artistic gifts clashed with his father's disapproval of them.
14	14	"Starlet Fever"	Adam Davidson	Jacob Epstein	February 8, 2007	1AMK13	14.53
A popular young actress is killed after being run off of trendy Mulholland Drive, and the paparazzi who follow her every move are immediately suspect. The starlet, however, has more in her life than just nagging photographers including fights with fellow actresses and a secret relationship.
15	15	"Here Comes the Judge"	Steve Gomer	Ken Woodruff	February 15, 2007	1AMK14	15.11
Not only is the wife of a popular and ultraconservative judge (Tim Matheson) murdered, the grieving spouse and Stark have an unpleasant history. Stark soon finds himself buried in the middle of another political hotbed, as the judge has a secret that threatens to ruin his judicial career.
16	16	"Blind Trust"	Marcos Siega	Devon Greggory	February 22, 2007	1AMK15	14.18
Stark puts his and his team's jobs on the line when he answers to the pleas of an old friend (Gary Cole) not to alert law enforcement that he found the body of one of his firm's interns--a young woman murdered as she prepared to blow the whistle on her immediate superior's embezzlement. Stark also has to continue dealing with Julie's DUI arrest.
17	17	"Backfire"	Anthony Hemingway	Ted Humphrey	March 29, 2007	1AMK16	14.49
In a controversial shooting, an upstanding black youth is killed and his drug-dealing cousin injured. Sebastian accuses a highly decorated black law enforcement officer and his white partner for the murder.
18	18	"Trial by Fire"	Paul Holahan	Ian Biederman	April 5, 2007	1AMK17	15.10
Sebastian, deputy DA Raina Troy, a convicted serial murderer they are trying to give the death penalty, and the courtroom audience are taken hostage by a distraught man who is to be sentenced for a robbery he claims he did not commit.
19	19	"Porn Free"	Martha Coolidge	Keith Eisner & Mimi Schmir	April 12, 2007	1AMK18	14.49
Sebastian faces an uphill battle in court when the respected head of a women's shelter creates a positive "vigilante justice" media buzz for the killing of a predatory porn producer.
20	20	"Fall From Grace"	Terrence O'Hara	Steve Sharlet	April 19, 2007	1AMK19	12.54
Sebastian goes up against his sly, sexy former legal protege when he prosecutes the case of a young professor who was pushed to his death from the balcony of his wife's ultra wealthy college boyfriend's apartment.
21	21	"Strange Bedfellows"	Paul Holahan	Michael Oates Palmer	April 26, 2007	1AMK20	14.10
Sebastian has to convince a jury that a kidnapper was not simply saving a child from abusive parents, and D.A. Devlin faces election day. This episode is similar to the Shawn Hornbeck/Ben Ownby kidnapping case.
22	22	"Wayne's World 2: Revenge of the Shark"	Adam Davidson	Ian Biederman	May 3, 2007	1AMK21	12.50
Stark goes on the warpath to bring down the infamous acquitted serial killer Wayne Robert Callison---now that he's a best-selling author with his book about defeating Stark in his previous trial---after the alarming discovery of another young woman found murdered. After losing the election, D.A. Devlin plans on going to private practice, until Stark makes her an offer. The team makes a critical discovery about Callison's youth in Ohio that leads to a very surprising twist.

=== Season 2 (2007–08) ===
No. overall	No. in season	Title	Directed by	Written by	Original release date	Prod. code	Viewers (millions)
23	1	"Gangster Movies"	Adam Davidson	Ian Biederman	September 23, 2007	2AMK01	11.42
After the prime witness to the murder of a film distribution executive is killed in a bus explosion, Sebastian, along with Danny Reyes (Kevin Alejandro) enlists Jessica's help in finding a new witness and bringing down a Russian mobster. Jessica has to strong-arm new D.A. Cutler into agreeing to arrange a key witness into the witness protection program---and later accepts Sebastian's previous job offer to join the team full-time.
24	2	"For Whom the Skel Rolls"	Paul Holahan	Gardner Stern	September 30, 2007	2AMK02	11.34
When new information about the murder of Isaac's former fiance surfaces, Sebastian and the team investigate without telling Isaac.
25	3	"Eye of the Beholder"	Marcos Siega	Ted Humphrey	October 7, 2007	2AMK03	11.27
After the body of a 22-year-old surgically enhanced aspiring actress turns up, the team begins working on identifying and convicting the killer. But the investigation leads to the discovery of one of the worst kind of exploitation there is in this industry: Sebastian's team uncovers that the victim's plastic surgeon was exchanging sex for surgery with her.
26	4	"Dr. Laura"	Kate Woods	Jacob Epstein	October 14, 2007	2AMK04	11.06
Jessica finds herself in trouble when her friend, Medical Examiner Laura Fields, is caught tampering with evidence in their murder case. When confronted in court, she accuses Jessica of having pressured her into giving false testimony and arranging the evidence to gain a conviction when Jessica was the D.A.
27	5	"Student Body"	Seith Mann	Story by : Bill Chais; Teleplay by : Ian Biederman & Gardner Stern	October 21, 2007	2AMK05	11.00
The search for the bomber on a school campus and the killer of a co-ed leads to a young chemical engineering student who has been sending incriminating letters about exacting revenge on his condescending peers. When the case is ready to go to trial, Danny is convinced that the student is innocent and he convinces Sebastian to let him search for another suspect. This episode references the then-recent Virginia Tech shooting.
28	6	"No Holds Barred"	Paul McCrane	Ken Woodruff	October 28, 2007	2AMK06	10.26
After a popular ultimate fighter commits suicide, an investigation reveals he had been the third fighter in the league to commit suicide and the league CEO had been pushing steroids on the players. Following the results of the investigation, Sebastian charges the CEO with murder.
29	7	"In Absentia"	Adam Davidson	Kim Clements	November 4, 2007	2AMK07	11.16
Sebastian and Danny travel to Mexico to attempt to retrieve a defendant who left the country to avoid being prosecuted for murdering his business partner/mistress.
30	8	"In the Crosshairs"	Paul Holahan	Keith Eisner	November 11, 2007	2AMK08	11.46
The mayor places undue pressure on Sebastian and his team to identify, locate, and convict a serial freeway sniper who is causing city-wide panic in Los Angeles. This episode is inspired by the D.C. sniper attacks.
31	9	"Burning Sensation"	James Frawley	Devon Greggory	November 18, 2007	2AMK09	12.65
Sebastian's team learns the victim of a serial arsonist had been murdered and dumped at the site of a fire.
32	10	"Every Breath You Take"	Dean White	Ted Humphrey	November 25, 2007	2AMK10	10.10
Five years after helping imprison a tennis star's stalker for her stabbing, Jessica is guilt-ridden when the tennis pro is fatally stabbed days after Jessica's failed attempt to uphold the man's conviction during his retrial.
33	11	"Shaun of the Dead"	Terrence O'Hara	Story by : Gary Glasberg & Ken Woodruff; Teleplay by : Ken Woodruff	December 9, 2007	2AMK11	9.83
When Shaun Mason, a member of star musician Justin Bishop’s entourage, is found dead in a hotel suite registered to Justin, Shark discovers how far members of the entourage will go to make a buck or protect their own.
34	12	"Partners in Crime"	David Miller	Story by : Bill Chais; Teleplay by : Ian Biederman	January 27, 2008	2AMK12	11.03
Dark secrets from Sebastian's past surface after the fatal shooting of his long-time friend and former law firm partner is determined to have been a failed attempt to kill Sebastian.
35	13	"Bar Fight"	Adam Davidson	Story by : Bill Chais; Teleplay by : Ian Biederman	April 29, 2008	2AMK13	10.16
Sebastian builds a case against an underworld kingpin as part of a covert deal initiated by the State Attorney General's office that could save Sebastian from being disbarred for having covered up the murderous act of a client in 1996.
36	14	"Leaving Las Vegas"	Paul Holahan	Keith Eisner	May 6, 2008	2AMK14	10.05
After being disbarred in California, Sebastian's Las Vegas gambling spell is soon sidelined by a notoriously crooked casino owner and former client who convinces Sebastian to make use of his Nevada law license to defend him in a murder trial.
37	15	"One Hit Wonder"	Steven Robman	Ted Humphrey	May 13, 2008	2AMK15	10.00
An abusive record producer is the prime suspect in the murder of an up-and-coming singer after leaving a party at the Playboy Mansion. However, another motive and suspect soon emerge, and Danny's actions put the case in jeopardy. This episode is inspired by the Murder of Lana Clarkson.
38	16	"Wayne's World 3: Killer Shark"	Adam Davidson	Ian Biederman	May 20, 2008	2AMK16	10.27
Shark's nemesis, Wayne Callison, has escaped prison with one mission in mind: revenge against Shark through any means necessary---including and especially kidnapping Julie.
