= Gilyard =

Gilyard is a surname. Notable people with the surname include:

- Clarence Gilyard (1955–2022), American actor and college professor
- Jacob Gilyard (born 1998), American basketball player
- Keith Gilyard (born 1952), prominent American professor of English
- Kevin Gilyard (born 1986), American rapper known professionally as Kevin Gates
- Lorenzo Gilyard (born 1950), American serial killer
- Mardy Gilyard (born 1986), American football wide receiver
