= Winfield High School =

Winfield High School may refer to:

- Winfield High School (Alabama), Marion County, Alabama
- Winfield High School (Kansas)
- Winfield High School (Missouri), Winfield R-IV School District
- Winfield High School (West Virginia)

== See also ==
- Wingfield High School, Jackson, Mississippi
