= Disappearance of Charles Arlin Henderson =

Unsolved 1991 disappearance in Missouri, US

Charles Arlin Henderson
- Born: Charles Arlin Leon Henderson; March 16, 1980; Moscow Mills, Missouri, US
- Disappeared: July 25, 1991 (aged 11); Fountain N' Lakes, Missouri, US
- Status: Missing for 34 years, 10 months and 26 days
- Height: 4 ft 5 in (135 cm)

Charles Arlin Leon Henderson (March 16, 1980 – disappeared July 25, 1991) is an American missing person who disappeared in Fountain N' Lakes, Missouri, on July 25, 1991, aged 11.

== Disappearance ==
Henderson was born on March 16, 1980, in Moscow Mills, Missouri, the son of Debbie Henderson-Griffith. As said by Debbie in a 2025 interview, he enjoyed swimming and shooting BB guns. He was last seen at 5 p.m., on July 25, 1991, after leaving his home in Fountain N' Lakes, on bicycle. He was wearing a camouflage tee shirt and pants, gray socks and black tennis shoes. His bicycle was found on October 10, in a bean field approximately 5 miles north of his home.

On March 10, 2000, Henderson's sister Joy Henderson-Leonard, was murdered by her husband, Bob Leonard, who subsequently committed suicide.

In 2001, Joshua Spangler, who was 13 at the time of Henderson's disappearance, confessed to abducting and killing Henderson after being forced to by two men. He later admitted to fabricating the story, and was charged with perjury.

Months before his disappearance, Henderson's uncle, James McWilliams, said he witnessed a tall, skinny man taking pictures of Henderson outside his school. This man is believed to have been Michael J. Devlin. Multiple of Henderson's relatives were shown pictures of someone who claimed to know Devlin, with many saying they knew him.

Henderson's case is one of two active missing person cases in Lincoln County, Missouri, alongside that of Bianca Piper, who disappeared in Foley on March 10, 2005, at the age of 13.
