= Thomas Lavy =

American farmer and FBI pursuee (1941–1995)

- Lavy, from a 1995 newspaper article.
- Born: Thomas Lewis Lavy; December 18, 1941; Winfield, Missouri
- Died: December 23, 1995 (aged 54); Little Rock, Arkansas
- Occupation: Farmer

Thomas Lewis Lavy (December 18, 1941 – December 23, 1995) was an American farmer who attempted to cross the Canada–US border into Canada from Alaska with several firearms, ricin toxin, and $89,000 in cash in 1993. He was turned away at the border, and the toxin impounded. Lavy claimed at the time that the ricin was to poison the coyotes on his farm. More than two years later he was arrested by the FBI on terrorism charges relating to the border incident, and Lavy hanged himself in his jail cell four days later.

Some media outlets called the incident a "thwarted terrorist attack" resulting in the death of the perpetrator, while others have suggested Lavy was the innocent victim of a "tragic case" of an overzealous FBI agent and prosecutor. One journalist opined this may well be "another case where the government hounds some poor guy without mercy...until he kills himself".

== Life ==
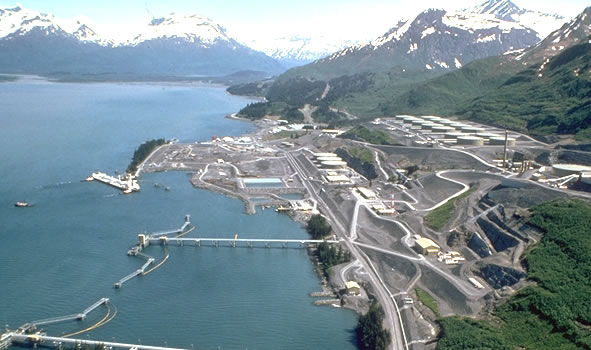
The pipeline terminal in Valdez

The second child of Lilleton Lavy and Cora Yates, Lavy served as a military policeman during the Korean War. Considered a naturalist who enjoyed gardening and hunting, he also kept a collection of exotic books, including several on elephant hunting. He was married to Rebecca Davis, with whom he lived in Virginia, and had two children, Lewis Edward Lavy and Lisa Kay Hoelting (née Lavy).

The Associated Press dubbed Lavy a survivalist; his family denied he had any such leanings. CQ Press claimed that Lavy was an alleged white supremacist, based on unsubstantiated reports that "Neo-Nazi" literature may have been found in his vehicle. In the 1970s, Lavy worked as a radio repairman for Motorola in Oklahoma City. He also lived in Troy, Missouri before taking a job as an electrician for an oil company on the Alyeska Pipeline in Valdez, Alaska. In the autumn of 1992, he visited his sister Betty Krieg and her husband Bill in Harvester, Missouri, and told them that he hoped to retire and purchase a small property where he could raise chickens and tend a garden. Several months later, he announced that he had found the perfect place, a cottage on six acres of land in Onia, Arkansas. Lavy packed his belongings for the move south in April 1993.

== Crossing the border ==
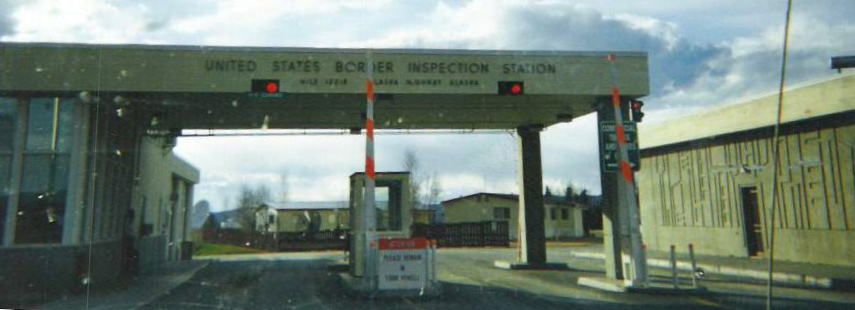
US Customs office at Alcan/Beaver Creek border crossing

[Lavy] had perpetrated no clear threat; the mere possession of the ricin was not itself a violation of federal law.

He crossed from Alaska into Canada in his truck at the Beaver Creek, Yukon border crossing. on 8 April 1993. Lavy was "honest and forthright" when he explained to Customs officials that he had a shotgun, two .22 calibre rifles and a muzzleloading rifle, 20,000 rounds of ammunition, $89,000 and 130 grams (approximately 0.28 of a pound) of ricin, considered third amongst the world's most deadly substances. In his car were two books, one describing how to extract ricin from castor beans, and another discussing ways to poison with toxic compounds; likely the books Silent Death and another some media reports dubbed The Poisoner's Handbook and others dubbed The Prisoner's Handbook. There were also reports mentioning a third book, titled Get Even: The Complete Book of Dirty Tricks.

Lavy explained his possession of the ricin, which he claimed to have taken from the U.S. Army, was for use on his farms against coyotes. He also told them that he kept it beside his cash as a deterrence against theft since a criminal would likely believe it was cocaine and kill himself snorting it. Another report said that he suggested he may coat his money in the powder, to prevent anyone stealing it. Federal officials did not believe his story about killing coyotes, equating it to using a thermonuclear device to ward off burglars.

After calling the U.S. Customs to run a criminal background check which came back negative, Lavy was denied entry into Canada, fined $750 for trying to import the weapons, and the ricin powder was confiscated. He was then released back into the United States and told to report to U.S. Customs; he did so, declaring $22,500 in cash and listing his address in Valdez as PO Box 1297. At this point, it seemed clear that no laws were considered to have been broken, and no prosecution would be forthcoming.

Canadian officials alerted their American counterparts of the incident, and also informed the Alaskan military base from which Lavy claimed to have stolen the poison. Neither were interested; they stated that they were unaware of any theft or crime being committed. It took the Canadians nearly a month before they understood the danger posed by ricin and transferred the bag to a container for hazardous materials. It was kept in storage for nearly two years. In this case, neither the Canadian nor American authorities had "heard of" ricin, and thus did not realise what it was. Lavy entered the Lower 48 through Portal, North Dakota on April 12, this time listing his mailing address in Arkansas as PO Box 894, HC 73, Onia.

== Arrest and death ==
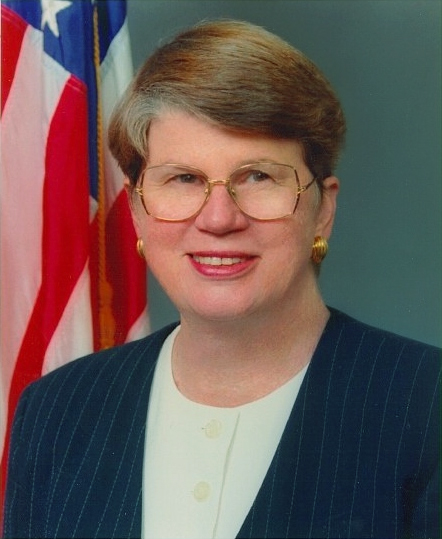
By this time, Attorney General Janet Reno was actively monitoring the case, and FBI headquarters were getting "hyped" about the upcoming raid.

I knew immediately that we had badly overreacted to the situation. However, a simple low-key arrest would not have accomplished headquarter's goal of having a terrorist incident to hype on the network news.

In the spring of 1995, FBI agent Thomas Lynch, previously involved in the ricin investigation of the Minnesota Patriots Council militia, was transferred to the FBI's Anchorage bureau in Alaska. Once there he learned of the Lavy-border-crossing-incident two years earlier and requested a grand jury convene to charge Lavy. On December 12, a grand jury recommended prosecution of Lavy.

After the fact, some journalists questioned why or how the FBI got involved at all. Lynch forwarded case details to the Little Rock FBI office, where it was assigned to agent Roy Christopher in Jonesboro. He determined that Lavy was an active member of the American Legion and had no arrest record, not even a driving violation. Christopher enlisted the help of agent Ivian C. Smith in drawing up a raid plan for the cottage where Lavy lived alone. The agents received day and nighttime aerial photographs from the FBI's Nightstalker aircraft. One FBI official later commented that "FBI headquarters was going to turn the Lavy arrest and search into a media event."

During the same period, the Canadian Customs station had been cleaned and the powder in storage was rediscovered and sent to a military doctor for examination. He confirmed it was ricin, only 7% pure, and it was sent to Fort Detrick in the United States to assist in the prosecution of Lavy.

Chemical warfare experts from the U.S. Army based in Aberdeen, Maryland joined with a 30-man team consisting of FBI agents, six members of the Hostage Rescue Team and the local sheriff Fred Black in storming the stone cottage Lavy owned in Onia, Arkansas on December 20. The team sneaked up on the residence through a neighboring cemetery. The fifty men encircled Lavy's house dressed in military and camoflouge fatigues and when Lavy noticed one staking out his house, he took his shotgun outside and approached agent Mark Jessie on the edge of his yard. Upon being informed that they were police officers, despite their lack of identification, Lavy placed his gun on the ground and allowed them to handcuff him. One FBI officer present later remarked that it was clear Lavy had no idea why he was the subject of a raid, and that his failed border crossing two years earlier likely never occurred to him.

Lavy was arrested without a struggle and was "completely truthful" and "completely cooperative" in explaining the contents of his house to the officials. Since the search of his house turned up only legal weapons, and even his simple possession of Ricin two years earlier was completely legal, he was charged with "possession of a toxin with intent to use it as a weapon" under the Biological Weapons Anti-Terrorism Act of 1989. Despite the charge, police found no ricin at the time of the arrest, although they did find several castor beans in a tin designed for Christmas fruitcake, which he had purchased by mail from a woman in Oregon. Other contents seized at the house included several collector-model rifles, five pistols, several thousand dollars in cash and Krugerrand gold.

Can you imagine being 54 years old and never arrested in your life, and being incarcerated and told you're facing potential life imprisonment on a situation that [you] were totally innocent of?

Lavy appointed Sam Hauer as his attorney. At the bail hearing on December 23, FBI agent Lynch testified that Lavy's powder was potent enough to kill 32,000 people, and that the charge could merit life imprisonment. U.S. Magistrate Jerry W. Cavaneau said that the government had not produced any evidence suggesting criminal intent, but ordered Lavy held without bail at the Pulaski County Detention Facility in Little Rock until a January court date in Alaska.

That night Lavy tied his shirt around his neck and around the prison bars, then sat down until he slowly strangled to death. The prisoner suicide was discovered at 6:00 a.m. by a guard. Lavy was taken to University Hospital and declared legally dead at 7:00 a.m.

== Aftermath ==
In a statement to the press, Lavy's lawyer blamed "An overzealous U.S. Attorney in Alaska and a hot dog F.B.I. agent" for the situation.

Following Lavy's death, the ricin was shipped back to Canada for destruction. Lavy's funeral was held at Kemper-Marsh Funeral Home, and he was buried at the Asbury Cemetery, in Foley, Missouri.

In 2003, Richard Sand wrote a fiction book in which the protagonist Lucas Rook was responsible for arranging the "suicide" of Lavy, who was portrayed as a poisoner. In March 1996, three months after the raid that led to Lavy's suicide, the United States Senate characterized the FBI's belief about the incident, noting that Lavy may have been trying to "fund and arm an underground terrorist militia". However, the report also confused the contents of Lavy's vehicle in 1993 and contents of his house following the 1995 raid. Ultimately, Hauer blamed Lavy's death on the actions of Robert Bundry, the "over-zealous" Alaskan prosecutor, and an unnamed FBI agent similarly enthused at the idea of taking Lavy down.
