= Crossroads Correctional Center =

Prison in Missouri, United States

Coordinates: 39°45′51″N 94°13′22″W

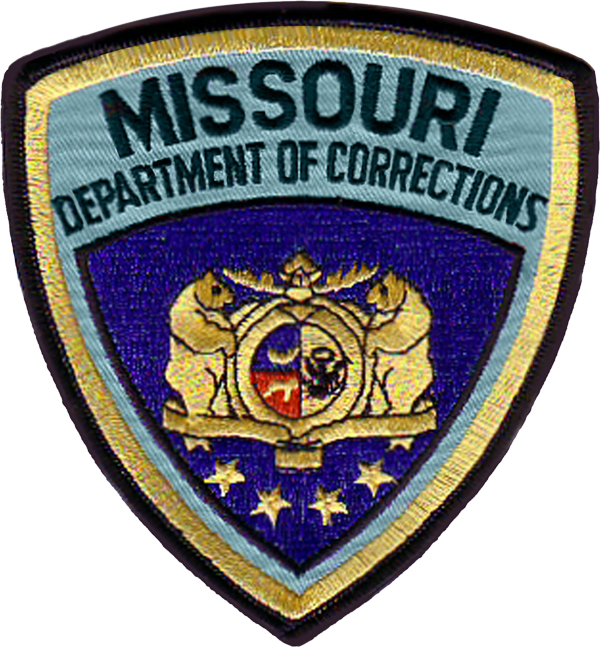
- Interactive map of Crossroads Correctional Center
- Location: Cameron, Missouri
- Status: Operational
- Security class: Maximum
- Capacity: 1,440
- Opened: 1997
- Closed: 2019
- Managed by: Missouri Department of Corrections
- Director: Anne L. Precythe
- Governor: Mike Parson
- Warden: Ronda J. Pash
- Website: doc.mo.gov/facilities/adult-institutions/warden-listing

Crossroads Correctional Center (CRCC) is a Missouri Department of Corrections state prison for men located in Cameron, DeKalb County, Missouri. (The town of Cameron straddles DeKalb and Clinton Counties.) According to the official Official Manual State of Missouri the facility has a capacity of 1,440 maximum security prisoners.

The facility opened in 1997 and is immediately adjacent to the Western Missouri Correctional Center, which opened in 1988. Crossroads was the first Missouri prison to install a perimeter electric fence with a lethal charge.

In January 2019, Missouri Governor Mike Parsons announced that Crossroads Correctional Center would be closing. In July 2019, many of the offenders were transferred to one side of Western Missouri Correctional Center which is adjacent to CRCC, and others where transferred to prisons throughout the state.

== Notable Inmates ==
Inmate Name	Register Number	Status	Details
Michael J. Devlin		Serving 74 life sentences.	Convicted of kidnapping and child sex crimes.
Lorenzo Gilyard	44287	Serving a life sentence.	Convicted of murdering 6 people.
Daniel O. Jones	170528	Serving a life sentence.	Convicted of murdering 4 people.
