= Biological Weapons Anti-Terrorism Act of 1989 =

United States law against bioterrorism

- Long title: An Act to implement the Convention on the Prohibition of the Development, Production, and Stockpiling of Bacteriological (Biological) and Toxin Weapons and Their Destruction, by prohibiting certain conduct relating to biological weapons, and for other purposes.
- Acronyms (colloquial): BWATA
- Enacted by: the 101st United States Congress
- Effective: May 22, 1990

Citations
- Public law: 101-298
- Statutes at Large: 104 Stat. 201

Codification
- Titles amended: 18 U.S.C.: Crimes and Criminal Procedure
- U.S.C. sections amended: 18 U.S.C. ch. 10 § 175 et seq.

Legislative history
- Introduced in the Senate as S. 993 by Herb Kohl (D–WI) on May 16, 1989; Committee consideration by Senate Judiciary; Passed the Senate on November 21, 1989 (Passed voice vote); Passed the House on May 8, 1990 (Passed without objection); Signed into law by President George H. W. Bush on May 22, 1990

The Biological Weapons Anti-Terrorism Act of 1989 (BWATA), Pub. L. 101–298, enacted May 22, 1990) was a piece of U.S. legislation that was passed into law in 1990. It provided for the implementation of the Biological Weapons Convention as well as criminal penalties for violation of its provisions. The law was amended in 1996 and has been used to prosecute several individuals.

== History ==
The Biological Weapons Anti-Terrorism Act of 1989 (BWATA) was drafted by University of Illinois international law professor Francis Boyle. The law, known as it went through the U.S. Senate during the 101st U.S. Congress as S. 993, was introduced to the Senate on May 16, 1989. The bill was sponsored by U.S. Senator Herb Kohl (D–WI) and collected 15 co-sponsors on its way through the Senate. An amended version of the bill passed the Senate in November 1989.

The U.S. House of Representatives version of the bill, carrying the same title, was introduced to the House on January 3, 1989. The sponsor of BWATA in the House was Representative Robert W. Kastenmeier (D–WI) and the legislation picked up 52 co-sponsors as it went through the House. The House of Representatives passed BWATA on May 8, 1990. BWATA was signed into law by then-U.S. President George H. W. Bush on May 22, 1990.

BWATA has been expanded two separate times through the implementation of new laws. The first expansion closed certain loopholes that critics complained made prosecution difficult. The Anti-Terrorism and Effective Death Penalty Act of 1996 amended the law to address these issues. (See "prosecution difficulties" below). BWATA was additionally expanded by the USA Patriot Act in 2001.

== Act ==
=== Definitions ===
The act broadly defined several terms related to biological warfare (BW). Those terms were: vector, toxin, biological agent and delivery system. BWATA defined a biological agent as:

any micro-organism, virus, infectious substance, or biological product that may be engineered as a result of biotechnology, or any naturally occurring or bioengineered component of any such microorganism, virus, infectious substance, or biological product, capable of causing death, disease, or other biological malfunction in a human, an animal, a plant, or another living organism; deterioration of food, water, equipment, supplies, or material of any kind or deleterious alteration of the environment

Previous U.S. interpretation of the Biological Weapons Convention (BWC) ban on biological agents was in line with the BWATA definition. The U.S. now maintains that the Article I of the BWC, which explicitly bans bio-weapons, does not apply to "non-lethal" biological agents. According to the Federation of American Scientists, current U.S. work on non-lethal agents greatly exceeds limitations set forth in the BWC.

The other three terms were defined in the act as follows:

- Toxin: "whatever its origin or method of production -- any poisonous substance produced by a living organism; or any poisonous isomer, homolog, or derivative of such a substance".
- Delivery system: "any apparatus, equipment, device, or means of delivery specifically designed to deliver or disseminate a biological agent, toxin, or vector".
- Vector: "a living organism capable of carrying a biological agent or toxin to a host".

=== Provisions ===
The Biological Weapons Anti-Terrorism Act of 1989 (BWATA) extended the scope of bio-warfare materials regulation to include private individuals and non-state organizations. The act made it illegal to buy, sell or manufacture biological agents for use as a weapon. To that end, the law implemented the 1975 ratification of the Biological Weapons Convention. BWATA, which became known as Public Law 101-298 upon its passage and signing, provided criminal penalties for those who violated its provisions. The act specifically exempted peaceful, often characterized as "defensive", biological weapons research.

BWATA, as passed, imposed no sentencing guidelines; this gave judges in the earliest prosecutions under the law wide latitude to impose sentences based on the provisions in the act. The specific section of the law that dictated sentencing for violators stated:

Whoever knowingly develops, produces, stockpiles, transfers, acquires, retains, or possesses any biological agent, toxin, or delivery system for use as a weapon, or knowingly assists a foreign state or any organization to do so, shall be fined under this title or imprisoned for life or any term of years, or both.

The act also provided that if a quantity of biological agent, or toxin appeared to have no peaceful purpose, it could be seized and subsequently destroyed. For these purposes the act allowed the U.S. Attorney General to obtain a seizure warrant. In addition, passage of the act made violation of its provisions a federal crime.

== Results ==
=== Prosecution difficulties ===
One of the initial results of the law was the difficulty it presented in obtaining successful criminal prosecutions. Intent to use biological agents as a weapon had to be proven by prosecutors, thus making a defense that the agents were for "peaceful purposes" plausible. For example, an individual named Larry Wayne Harris attempted to procure biological agents from the American Type Culture Center for "defensive" research, per the BWC, in 1995. To address these issues the law was amended by the Anti-Terrorism and Effective Death Penalty Act of 1996. In part, the 1996 law required all private and academic organizations to register any possible BW agents with the U.S. Centers for Disease Control (CDC). In 1997 the two laws were called a "model" for what may be needed to prevent acts of domestic biological terrorism.

=== Prosecutions under the law ===
In April 1993 Thomas Lavy was stopped by Canada border officials at the Alaska-Canada border. Lavy, an electrician from Valdez, Alaska, declared that he was crossing with 20,000 rounds of ammunition, four guns, $89,000, and 130 grams of ricin. After Canadian officials let him go the Federal Bureau of Investigation (FBI) investigated the case and on December 20, 1995, the FBI arrested Lavy at his farm in Arkansas. Castor beans were recovered from the scene, and Lavy was charged under BWATA with possession of a biological toxin with intent to kill. Lavy was never convicted, two days before Christmas 1995 he hanged himself while awaiting arraignment and trial.

The first convictions under BWATA came in 1994 and 1995 and stemmed from a 1991 case in Minnesota. An American anti-government group headquartered in Minneapolis known as the Minnesota Patriot's Council mail-ordered castor beans and managed to extract about 0.7 grams of 5% ricin, despite having no specific expertise in biological warfare. The group planned to use the ricin to assassinate a deputy U.S. marshal and a local sheriff. In the end, four members of the Patriot's Council were convicted in the case under the BWATA law. It was reported that the amount of ricin was enough to kill about 100 people.

Since the first convictions under BWATA others have faced prosecution stemming from the provisions in the law, some were successful, others were not. A man indicted under the provisions of the act for possessing ricin and nicotine sulfate in 1997 pleaded guilty to manufacturing ricin in October of that year. He was sentenced to more than 12 years in U.S. federal prison.

== See also ==
- Anti-terrorism legislation
- Geneva Protocol
- Statement on Chemical and Biological Defense Policies and Programs
- United States biological weapons program
- USA PATRIOT Act
- Thomas Lavy
