= Michael J. Devlin =

American convicted kidnapper and child sexual abuser (born 1965)

- Born: Michael John Devlin; November 19, 1965 (age 61); St. Louis County, Missouri, U.S.
- Occupations: Pizza shop manager; funeral home worker
- Status: Incarcerated
- Convictions: Kidnapping; Child molestation; Production of child pornography
- Penalty: 74 life sentences plus 2,020 years (4,240 years)

Details
- Victims: 2
- Imprisoned at: Crossroads Correctional Center, Cameron, Missouri

Michael John Devlin (born November 19, 1965) is an American criminal convicted of kidnapping and child sexual abuse of two young boys, Shawn Hornbeck and Ben Ownby. He is serving 74 life sentences plus 2,020 years at Crossroads Correctional Center in Cameron, Missouri. His life sentences are 30 years each; his total sentence is 4,240 years.

== Early life, family and career ==
As a child, Devlin was adopted into a large family, where he had three brothers (also adopted) and two sisters. He grew up in Webster Groves, Missouri. He was a resident of Kirkwood, Missouri, who worked as a manager for Imo's Pizza and as a part-time funeral home worker at Bopp Chapel. According to a friend, Devlin had once been outgoing. He had changed "to a much quieter person" after he developed diabetes and had two toes amputated in 2002.

== Crimes ==
On January 12, 2007, Devlin was taken into custody and charged with the abduction of 13-year-old Ben Ownby, whom police found that day and whom Devlin had abducted four days earlier. At the time of his discovery, law enforcement officials found another missing boy, Shawn Hornbeck. He had disappeared on October 6, 2002, then aged 11, while riding his bike to a friend's house in Richwoods, Missouri. No one had heard from him until he was discovered in Devlin's apartment.

The two boys were discovered after police noticed Devlin's white pickup truck, which matched the description of a vehicle in the vicinity of Ownby's abduction, in the parking lot of his apartment complex. They happened to be there to serve an unrelated arrest warrant. Hornbeck lived with Devlin, who presented the boy as his son. He was separated from his family for a total of four years, three months and six days, during which time the Shawn Hornbeck Foundation and Search and Rescue Team were established. Both boys were reunited with their families after their discovery.

Soon after Devlin's arrest, prosecutors and investigators from Washington, Franklin, St. Louis and Lincoln counties, along with the FBI, the Missouri State Highway Patrol, and Kirkwood and St. Charles police, formed a task force to investigate Devlin's possible involvement in other unsolved cases.

Devlin is also believed to be the kidnapper of Charles Arlin Henderson, 11, and Bianca Piper, 13; however, his involvement in Piper's disappearance is discredited due to his interest in boys specifically.

=== Prosecution ===
Devlin was charged with one count of kidnapping in Franklin County, Missouri, as well as one count of kidnapping and armed criminal action in Washington County. On January 18, 2007, Devlin pleaded not guilty via closed-circuit television on the charges of child kidnapping. Prosecutors in the case said Devlin had already confessed. He was held at the Franklin County Sheriff's Department on a $1 million cash-only bail. He also had a $3 million bond in Washington County.

On February 5, St. Louis County Prosecutor Robert McCulloch added 71 new felony charges to the existing charges previously filed by Washington and Franklin County prosecutors. The first 18 counts (one count of kidnapping and 17 counts of forcible sodomy) pertain to one of the abductions. The remaining 53 charges are kidnapping and forcible sodomy charges related to the other abduction. Each of these individual counts was a felony and carried the possibility of life in prison.

On February 6, a motion by Devlin's attorneys, Ethan Corlija and Michael Kielty, for a gag order against the New York Post and reporter Susannah Cahalan was denied in Franklin County Court. Franklin County Associate Circuit Judge David Tobben also denied a motion for her to turn over her notes to the attorneys, and denied or refused to immediately hear two other requests by Devlin's attorneys.

On February 28, a felony indictment in Franklin County charged Devlin with one count of child kidnapping and one count of armed criminal action for allegedly using a deadly weapon in kidnapping Ownby. This grand jury indictment replaced the previous Franklin County kidnapping charge against Devlin and added the weapon charge. On March 1, Devlin was charged in federal court with four counts of producing child pornography, including photos and video footage taken, and with two counts of transporting a minor across state lines to engage in sexual activity in Illinois. On April 16, Washington County prosecutor John Rupp filed additional charges against Devlin, accusing him of attempted murder, kidnapping, armed criminal action, three counts of forcible sodomy and one count of attempted forcible sodomy.

=== Convictions ===
On October 6, 2007, prosecutors announced that Devlin would plead guilty to all charges against him in all four jurisdictions.

On October 8, Devlin pleaded guilty to the charges against him in Franklin County. During that court appearance, he was sentenced to life in prison for child kidnapping and to a shorter, concurrent sentence for armed criminal action. He appeared in the three other jurisdictions in which he had been charged in the Ownby, Hornbeck and child pornography cases, on October 9 and 10.

On the morning of October 9, Devlin pleaded guilty to charges against him in Washington County. During that court appearance, he was sentenced to three life sentences for kidnapping and other crimes against Shawn Hornbeck. The sentences were to begin after he had served the life sentence imposed on October 8 for kidnapping Ben Ownby. This brought Devlin's total sentence for incarceration to 1,850 years.

On December 21, Devlin was sentenced to an additional 170 years for making pornography of one of the captive boys. Devlin was transferred to the Crossroads Correctional Center in Cameron, Missouri, to begin serving the first of his life sentences on January 30, 2008.

=== Incarceration ===
On April 9, 2011, during breakfast at the dining hall of Crossroads Correctional Center, Devlin was stabbed several times with two "ice picks" by another inmate in protective custody, Troy L. Fenton, who was also serving a life sentence. Corrections officers spotted the assault and ordered Fenton to stop. Fenton complied by dropping to the ground on his stomach. Devlin received several wounds and was briefly treated in a hospital and returned to the prison.

According to prison officials, Fenton had made the weapons from metal guide bars on his typewriter. He was cited for having a 15-inch sharpened steel rod, complete with a plastic handle, hidden under his pillow in his cell. Fenton said he was motivated to attack out of anger at Devlin's crimes. As of May 2011, investigation of the assault was ongoing and Fenton might face charges related to the attack. Devlin's security had been a concern for state prison officials since his arrest. Officials contemplated sending him out of state or providing him with a new identity. However, some victims' family members objected to the move, and the plan was dropped.

== See also ==
- Disappearance of Bianca Piper, unsolved 2005 disappearance of a 13-year-old in Foley, Missouri, in which Devlin became a suspect
