= Fountain N' Lakes, Missouri =

Fountain N' Lakes
- Village
- Location of Fountain N' Lakes, Missouri
- Coordinates: 38°58′08″N 90°50′57″W
- Country: United States
- State: Missouri
- County: Lincoln

Area
  - Total: 0.13 sq mi (0.33 km^{2})
  - Land: 0.13 sq mi (0.33 km^{2})
  - Water: 0 sq mi (0.00 km^{2})
- Elevation: 600 ft (180 m)

Population (2020)
  - Total: 169
  - Density: 1,313.7/sq mi (507.21/km^{2})
- Time zone: UTC-6 (Central (CST))
  - Summer (DST): UTC-5 (CDT)
- ZIP code: 63362
- Area code: 636
- FIPS code: 29-25411
- GNIS feature ID: 2398909

Fountain N' Lakes is a village in Lincoln County, Missouri, United States. As of the 2020 census, Fountain N' Lakes had a population of 169.

== Geography ==
According to the United States Census Bureau, the village has a total area of 0.14 square miles (0.36 km^{2}), all land.

== Demographics ==
Historical population
Census	Pop.	Note	%±
2000	129		—
2010	165		27.9%
2020	169		2.4%
U.S. Decennial Census

=== 2010 census ===
As of the census of 2010, there were 165 people, 62 households, and 47 families living in the village. The population density was 1,178.6 inhabitants per square mile (455.1/km^{2}). There were 71 housing units at an average density of 507.1 per square mile (195.8/km^{2}). The racial makeup of the village was 95.8% White, 1.8% from other races, and 2.4% from two or more races. Hispanic or Latino of any race were 2.4% of the population.

There were 62 households, of which 35.5% had children under the age of 18 living with them, 53.2% were married couples living together, 14.5% had a female householder with no husband present, 8.1% had a male householder with no wife present, and 24.2% were non-families. 21.0% of all households were made up of individuals, and 3.2% had someone living alone who was 65 years of age or older. The average household size was 2.66 and the average family size was 2.98.

The median age in the village was 40.9 years. 21.8% of residents were under the age of 18; 5.5% were between the ages of 18 and 24; 29.1% were from 25 to 44; 35.2% were from 45 to 64; and 8.5% were 65 years of age or older. The gender makeup of the village was 49.7% male and 50.3% female.

=== 2000 census ===
As of the census of 2000, there were 129 people, 48 households, and 33 families living in the village. The population density was 904.1 inhabitants per square mile (349.1/km^{2}). There were 59 housing units at an average density of 413.5 per square mile (159.7/km^{2}). The racial makeup of the village was 99.22% White and 0.78% Native American.

There were 48 households, out of which 31.3% had children under the age of 18 living with them, 50.0% were married couples living together, 8.3% had a female householder with no husband present, and 29.2% were non-families. 16.7% of all households were made up of individuals, and 2.1% had someone living alone who was 65 years of age or older. The average household size was 2.69 and the average family size was 3.00.

In the village, the population was spread out, with 26.4% under the age of 18, 8.5% from 18 to 24, 27.1% from 25 to 44, 27.9% from 45 to 64, and 10.1% who were 65 years of age or older. The median age was 38 years. For every 100 females, there were 115.0 males. For every 100 females age 18 and over, there were 115.9 males.

The median income for a household in the village was $30,313, and the median income for a family was $31,563. Males had a median income of $28,036 versus $23,750 for females. The per capita income for the village was $14,108. There were 17.2% of families and 15.7% of the population living below the poverty line, including 20.7% of those under 18 and 27.3% of those over 64.

== Education ==
It is in the Troy R-III School District. The district's comprehensive high school is Troy Buchanan High School.

== Notable people ==
- Charles Arlin Henderson (1980–disappeared 1991), missing person
