= Clifton Ray =

American serial killer

- Born: July 27, 1958 (age 68); United States
- Status: Incarcerated
- Convictions: First degree murder; Second degree murder (2 counts)
- Penalty: Life without parole

Details
- Victims: 3–9+
- Span of crimes: 1987–1994
- Country: United States
- State: Missouri
- Date apprehended: June 1, 1994
- Imprisoned at: Western Missouri Correctional Center

Clifton Lee Ray Jr. (born July 27, 1958) is an American serial killer, responsible for at least three murders in Kansas City, Missouri, between 1987 and 1992, and is suspected in six other murders. Ray was convicted of murdering his neighbor in 1995, and was soon going to be eligible for parole until DNA profiling exposed his responsibility in the murders of Deborah Taylor and Joycie Flowers. In October 2007, Ray was convicted of both murders and was sentenced to life imprisonment.

== Biography ==
Ray grew up in a neighborhood of working-class families in Kansas City. His father was a used car salesman and operated a gas station, as well as several salvage yards, where Ray also worked. Ray Jr. attended a Baptist church and played on their little league team. In school, he was an average student and played football. He graduated from Paseo High School in 1976.

After high school, Ray attended MCC Penn-Valley for a semester. He later joined the U.S. Marines, where he served three years at Camp Pendleton. After being discharged, Ray returned home and worked various odd jobs.

In 1979 he was arrested for rape, but the charge was later dismissed. Ray enrolled in Langston University, where he was charged with snatching a woman's purse. Later, he married a woman he had known since high school; they had four children.

In 1987, Ray was charged with second-degree murder in the death of Tonya Taylor, 23, who was found nude and beaten to death on May 16, but the charges were dismissed due to lack of evidence.

Ray was arrested many times over the years, with 21 recorded charges involving disorderly conduct, resisting arrest, drugs, indecent exposure, rape, and murder, but was always able to escape lengthy prison sentences. In 1992, Ray sought treatment for drug and alcohol abuse. After his release, he moved into the Royal Towers Apartments and began training in heating and air conditioning repair.

== Victims ==
On December 11, 1987, Deborah D. Taylor, was found strangled to death in a vacant field. She was fully clothed, but DNA recovered from her thigh and a tissue nearby was matched to Ray in 2003. Taylor attended Pittsburg State University and was a mother of two daughters.

On May 24, 1990, Joycie Flowers, 41, was found dead in a homeless camp in Kansas City. She was naked, except for a sock, with bite marks from rats on her body. Semen discovered inside her body and mouth was later tested and matched to Ray. Flowers was the mother of four children and served as a Sunday school teacher and choir director at her church.

Ray became a suspect in the mysterious deaths of residents at the Royal Towers Apartments in Kansas City, which began not long after he moved into the building.

On October 10, 1993, Ernest Taylor, 66, was found stabbed to death in his apartment. In 1994, Ray was charged with the second-degree murder of Taylor. The charges were later dismissed, though police did have records showing that Ray sold Taylor's television to a pawn shop.

On December 8, 1993, Leroy Hightower, 54, was found dead. His body was badly decomposed and a cause of death was unable to be determined; Ray was never charged with his murder. Hightower was a Marine veteran of the Vietnam War and a retired officer for the Kansas City Police Department.

On March 30, 1994, Mia Smith, 29, was found strangled in the sixth-floor stairway of the apartment building. Though police were suspicious of Ray, he was never charged for her murder.

On April 27, 1994, Bobby J. Robertson, 68, was found strangled to death in his fourth-floor studio apartment. Ray was charged with first-degree murder the following day; police stated he forced his way into Robertson's apartment, strangled him, and stole his money.

== Convictions ==
In 1995, Ray was convicted of strangling Bobby J. Robertson. Just days before Ray was to be released on parole, DNA evidence linked Ray to the murders of Deborah Taylor and Joycie Flowers and he was subsequently charged.

On October 3, 2007, Ray was sentenced to life in prison without parole for the 1990 murder of Joycie Flowers. He was later convicted for the murder of Deborah D. Taylor.

Upon the sentencing, Ray has remained in various prison facilities. As of September 2023, Ray is currently housed at the Jefferson City Correctional Center, under the ID number 511811.

== See also ==
- List of serial killers in the United States
