= Chain of Rocks, Missouri =

- Village
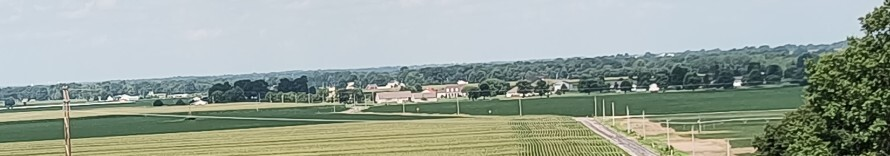
- Chain of Rocks in 2026

- Location of Chain of Rocks, Missouri
- Coordinates: 38°54′55″N 90°48′09″W
- Country: United States
- State: Missouri
- County: Lincoln

Area
  - Total: 0.19 sq mi (0.49 km^{2})
  - Land: 0.19 sq mi (0.48 km^{2})
  - Water: 0.0039 sq mi (0.01 km^{2})
- Elevation: 479 ft (146 m)

Population (2020)
  - Total: 97
  - Density: 527.8/sq mi (203.79/km^{2})
- Time zone: UTC-6 (Central (CST))
  - Summer (DST): UTC-5 (CDT)
- ZIP code: 63369
- Area code: 636
- FIPS code: 29-13006
- GNIS feature ID: 2397596

Chain of Rocks is a village in Lincoln County, Missouri, United States. As of the 2020 census, Chain of Rocks had a population of 97.

== History ==
Chain of Rocks was platted in the 1830s, and named for a rock formation near the original town site. A post office called Chain of Rocks was established in 1869, and remained in operation until 1907.

== Geography ==
Chain of Rocks was named after an exposure of bedrock in the Cuivre River north of St. Louis that forms a remarkable "chain of rocks" across its width. According to the United States Census Bureau, the village has a total area of 0.17 square miles (0.44 km^{2}), all land.

== Demographics ==
Historical population
Census	Pop.	Note	%±
2000	91		—
2010	93		2.2%
2020	97		4.3%
U.S. Decennial Census

=== 2010 census ===
As of the census of 2010, there were 93 people, 32 households, and 26 families living in the village. The population density was 547.1 inhabitants per square mile (211.2/km^{2}). There were 39 housing units at an average density of 229.4 per square mile (88.6/km^{2}). The racial makeup of the village was 100.0% White.

There were 32 households, of which 43.8% had children under the age of 18 living with them, 62.5% were married couples living together, 15.6% had a female householder with no husband present, 3.1% had a male householder with no wife present, and 18.8% were non-families. 15.6% of all households were made up of individuals, and 6.3% had someone living alone who was 65 years of age or older. The average household size was 2.91 and the average family size was 3.27.

The median age in the village was 39.3 years. 30.1% of residents were under the age of 18; 8.6% were between the ages of 18 and 24; 20.4% were from 25 to 44; 29.1% were from 45 to 64; and 11.8% were 65 years of age or older. The gender makeup of the village was 49.5% male and 50.5% female.

=== 2000 census ===
As of the census of 2000, there were 91 people, 34 households, and 24 families living in the village. The population density was 528.1 inhabitants per square mile (203.9/km^{2}). There were 42 housing units at an average density of 243.7 per square mile (94.1/km^{2}). The racial makeup of the village was 100.00% White.

There were 34 households, out of which 38.2% had children under the age of 18 living with them, 58.8% were married couples living together, 8.8% had a female householder with no husband present, and 29.4% were non-families. 29.4% of all households were made up of individuals, and 8.8% had someone living alone who was 65 years of age or older. The average household size was 2.68 and the average family size was 3.29.

In the village, the population was spread out, with 28.6% under the age of 18, 6.6% from 18 to 24, 33.0% from 25 to 44, 22.0% from 45 to 64, and 9.9% who were 65 years of age or older. The median age was 36 years. For every 100 females, there were 102.2 males. For every 100 females age 18 and over, there were 103.1 males.

The median income for a household in the village was $31,250, and the median income for a family was $38,125. Males had a median income of $61,000 versus $22,500 for females. The per capita income for the village was $18,848. There were 7.1% of families and 13.6% of the population living below the poverty line, including 28.6% of under eighteens and 44.4% of those over 64.

== Education ==
The area school district is Winfield R-IV School District.
