= Daniel O. Jones =

American serial killer (born 1969)

Daniel Jones
- Mugshot
- Born: Daniel Oliver Jones; September 26, 1969 (age 57); Kansas City, Missouri, U.S.
- Status: Incarcerated
- Convictions: First degree murder; Second degree murder (3 counts); Forcible rape; Armed criminal action
- Penalty: Life imprisonment without parole

Details
- Victims: 4
- Span of crimes: 1998–2001
- Country: United States
- State: Missouri
- Date apprehended: March 8, 2001
- Imprisoned at: Crossroads Correctional Center

Daniel Oliver Jones (born September 26, 1969) is an American serial killer who raped and stabbed four young women to death in Kansas City, Missouri, between 1998 and 2001. He was arrested shortly after the final murder, and DNA evidence linked him to the previous crimes, after which he confessed and was given multiple life sentences.

== Early life ==
Jones was born on September 26, 1969. A native of Kansas City, Jones attended Raytown South High School in Raytown, Missouri. While a student, he built a reputation as a disrupter in class and was frequently in trouble.

On May 20, 1987, Jones attacked a 32-year-old teacher in her classroom and dragged her into the school's auditorium where he raped and threatened to kill her. After approximately 15 minutes, the teacher was able to escape, and Jones was arrested three days later when the victim identified him from the school yearbook. He pleaded innocent at his arraignment when he was indicted on one count of forcible rape.

In 1988, Jones was found guilty and was sentenced to ten years in prison. In 1989, he attempted to appeal his sentence by claiming that prosecutors should have been prohibited from using his inappropriate school behavior as evidence, but the appeal was rejected. Jones was paroled after serving eight years of his sentence on August 27, 1996, and registered as a Level 3 sex offender.

== Murders ==
On December 2, 1998, Jones broke into the apartment of 19-year-old Jenai Douglas, a former neighbor from his childhood. He brandished a knife and fatally stabbed Douglas numerous times in her bedroom. He left the apartment soon after the murder without stealing any items, and later that day Douglas was discovered by a roommate. According to Kim Douglas, the victim's mother, Jones would visit her house on multiple occasions to offer condolences after Jenai's killing. In February 2000, shortly after the first anniversary of Jenai's murder, a reward of $3,000 was offered for information leading to an arrest. Kim Douglas had added an extra $2,000 to the standard $1,000 in hopes of better media attention to the case.

On March 10, 1999, Jones broke into the home of 21-year-old Kaliquah Gilliam on Arleta Boulevard, brandishing a knife and fatally stabbing her a total of 36 times. Her body was discovered later that day by her visiting cousin. At the time, Gilliam was involved in a legal case for allegedly being the getaway driver in the robbery of a U-Haul center in January. In the months after, Jones befriended and began a sexual relationship with 21-year-old Roxanne Colley, despite her having a boyfriend. Jones would later claim that her having a boyfriend and constantly cheating angered him, and on August 16, he smashed Colley's back patio window to enter her apartment. Armed with a knife, he restrained Colley, sexually assaulted her, and stabbed her repeatedly before slashing her throat, ultimately killing her.

On March 6, 2001, armed with a knife, Jones broke into the Linden Hill apartment of Candriea White, an 18-year-old mother of two. He chased White from room to room before restraining her in the kitchen, proceeding to stab her 14 times and slitting her throat, but choosing not to harm her infant children, he fled the scene. Later that afternoon, a neighbor noticed White's front door ajar and peeked in only to notice her body lying in a corner.

== Arrest and trial ==
On March 8, Jones was arrested after a bloody palm print of White's killer matched a print Jones had on file. While in jail, a sample of his DNA was collected and submitted into the state database, and in July investigators were notified when his DNA was matched to the semen evidence left behind at Roxanne Colley's murder. Jones appointed Horton Lance to defend him during his trial, who argued that Jones had an alibi the day of White's murder as his family members testified that he was with them that afternoon. Lance also cast doubt on the fingerprinting evidence that was used to charge Jones, saying that the prosecutors lacked witnesses, a confession, and a motive. On August 21, 2002, the jury found Jones guilty of White's murder, subsequently imposing the sentence of life imprisonment without parole.

Jones was then due to await trial for the murder of Colley, for which he could have faced the death penalty. During this time, he was investigated as a suspect in the murders of Douglas and Gilliam. His DNA was taken and compared to physical evidence left at the murders, but the samples were not enough to identify him as the killer. Nevertheless, the cases were linked to Jones due to staunch similarities in modus operandi, and prosecutors filed murder charges in early 2004. In April, Jones confessed to killing Colley, Douglas and Gilliam and offered to plead guilty to all charges to avoid a possible death sentence. Gilliam's grandmother said that, while she was frustrated with Jones, she did not want him to be sentenced to death because, according to her, he was just a young man. Jones is currently serving his sentence at the Crossroads Correctional Center.

== See also ==
- List of serial killers in the United States
