= Winfield, Missouri =

- City
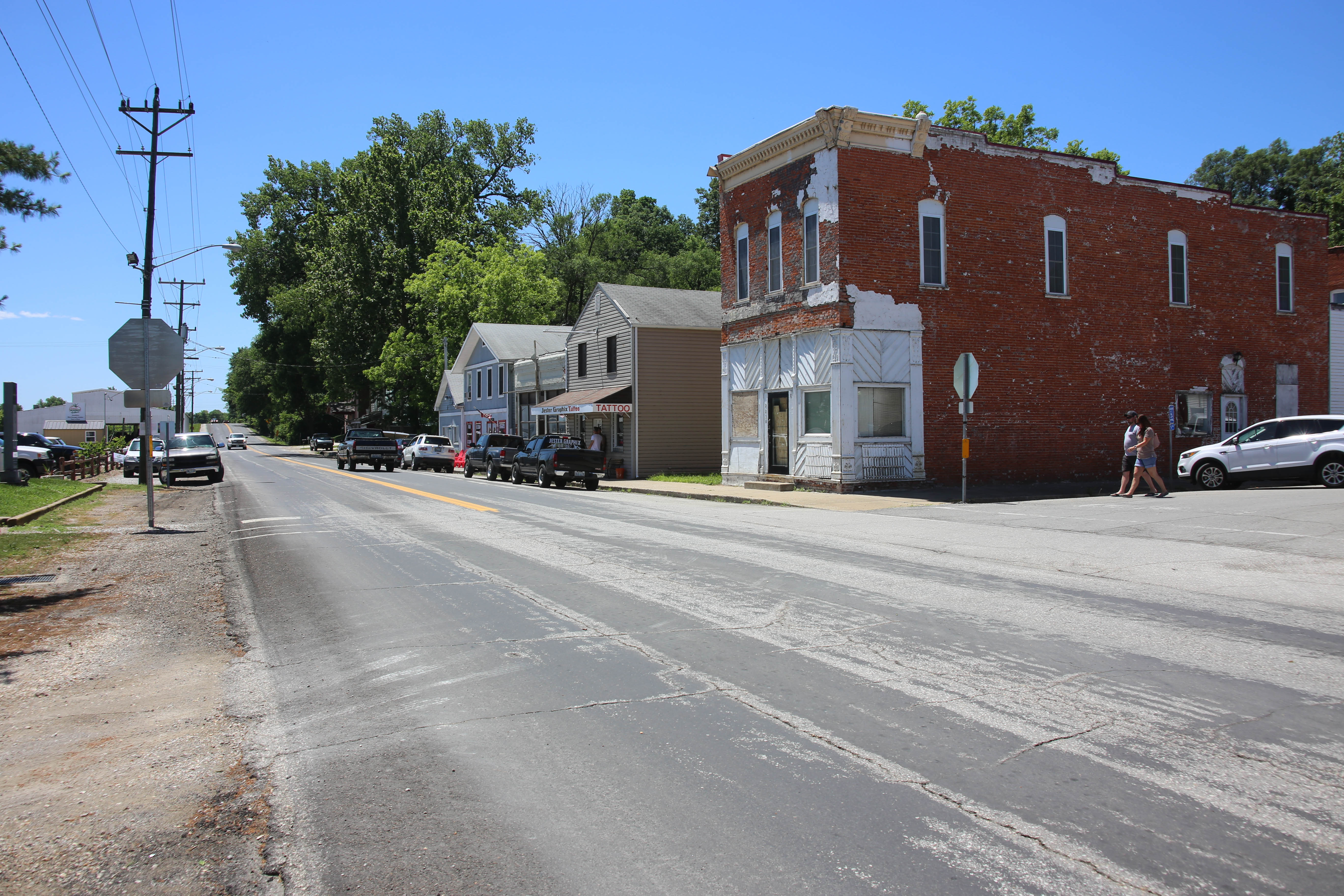
- Winfield in 2018

- Location of Winfield, Missouri
- Coordinates: 38°59′50″N 90°44′18″W
- Country: United States
- State: Missouri
- County: Lincoln
- Incorporated: 1882

Government
  - Mayor: Nicole Hanson

Area
  - Total: 0.85 sq mi (2.20 km^{2})
  - Land: 0.85 sq mi (2.20 km^{2})
  - Water: 0 sq mi (0.00 km^{2})
- Elevation: 446 ft (136 m)

Population (2020)
  - Total: 1,518
  - Density: 1,787.0/sq mi (689.98/km^{2})
- Time zone: UTC-6 (Central (CST))
  - Summer (DST): UTC-5 (CDT)
- ZIP code: 63389
- Area code: 636
- FIPS code: 29-80422
- GNIS feature ID: 728996
- Website: winfieldmo.org

Winfield is a city in Lincoln County, Missouri, United States. As of the 2020 census, Winfield had a population of 1,518.

== History ==
Winfield was laid out in 1879, and named after Winfield Scott Killam, the original owner of the town site. A post office called Winfield has been in operation since 1880.

On June 18, 2008, floodwaters opened a 150-foot breach in a primary levee along the Mississippi River in Winfield. The breach allowed floodwaters to claim dozens of homes and large tracts of farmland and put pressure on a secondary levee. The breach also prompted Lincoln County emergency officials to order the evacuation of residents east of Winfield. Press reports noted that some evacuees were being housed at the local high school.

On April 9, 2009, Winfield elected their mayor, Harry Stonebraker, for a fourth term, several weeks after he died of a heart attack. This was because ballot papers had already been printed and absentee voting had begun. He won by a landslide, securing 90% of the vote by April 9. Winfield appointed a temporary mayor to serve until a special election was held in April 2010.

== Geography ==
According to the United States Census Bureau, the city has a total area of 0.64 square miles (1.66 km^{2}), all land.

== Demographics ==
Historical population
Census	Pop.	Note	%±
1880	30		—
1900	440		—
1910	422		−4.1%
1920	418		−0.9%
1930	386		−7.7%
1940	484		25.4%
1950	474		−2.1%
1960	564		19.0%
1970	620		9.9%
1980	592		−4.5%
1990	672		13.5%
2000	723		7.6%
2010	1,404		94.2%
2020	1,518		8.1%
U.S. Decennial Census

=== 2020 census ===
As of the 2020 census, Winfield had a population of 1,518. The median age was 33.2 years. 30.1% of residents were under the age of 18 and 10.1% of residents were 65 years of age or older. For every 100 females there were 97.9 males, and for every 100 females age 18 and over there were 96.5 males age 18 and over.

0.0% of residents lived in urban areas, while 100.0% lived in rural areas.

There were 543 households in Winfield, of which 42.2% had children under the age of 18 living in them. Of all households, 44.0% were married-couple households, 18.6% were households with a male householder and no spouse or partner present, and 26.5% were households with a female householder and no spouse or partner present. About 29.6% of all households were made up of individuals and 10.3% had someone living alone who was 65 years of age or older.

There were 589 housing units, of which 7.8% were vacant. The homeowner vacancy rate was 1.4% and the rental vacancy rate was 4.6%.

Racial composition as of the 2020 census
Race	Number	Percent
White	1,331	87.7%
Black or African American	40	2.6%
American Indian and Alaska Native	5	0.3%
Asian	11	0.7%
Native Hawaiian and Other Pacific Islander	2	0.1%
Some other race	9	0.6%
Two or more races	120	7.9%
Hispanic or Latino (of any race)	35	2.3%

=== 2010 census ===
At the 2010 census there were 1,404 people, 525 households, and 360 families living in the city. The population density was 2,193.8 inhabitants per square mile (847.0/km^{2}). There were 568 housing units at an average density of 887.5 per square mile (342.7/km^{2}). The racial makup of the city was 97.0% White, 0.4% African American, 0.3% Asian, 0.1% Pacific Islander, 0.9% from other races, and 1.3% from two or more races. Hispanic or Latino of any race were 1.3%.

Of the 525 households 43.2% had children under the age of 18 living with them, 47.0% were married couples living together, 16.2% had a female householder with no husband present, 5.3% had a male householder with no wife present, and 31.4% were non-families. 24.6% of households were one person and 7.6% were one person aged 65 or older. The average household size was 2.61 and the average family size was 3.10.

The median age was 31 years. 28.4% of residents were under the age of 18; 8.8% were between the ages of 18 and 24; 33.8% were from 25 to 44; 20.4% were from 45 to 64; and 8.5% were 65 or older. The gender makeup of the city was 49.9% male and 50.1% female.

=== 2000 census ===
At the 2000 census there were 723 people, 293 households, and 183 families living in the city. The population density was 1,293.5 inhabitants per square mile (499.4/km^{2}). There were 319 housing units at an average density of 570.7 per square mile (220.3/km^{2}). The racial makup of the city was 98.62% White, 0.14% African American, 0.28% Native American, 0.41% Asian, and 0.55% from two or more races. Hispanic or Latino of any race were 0.28%.

Of the 293 households 34.1% had children under the age of 18 living with them, 39.2% were married couples living together, 17.7% had a female householder with no husband present, and 37.5% were non-families. 30.7% of households were one person and 10.2% were one person aged 65 or older. The average household size was 2.42 and the average family size was 3.01.

The age distribution was 28.1% under the age of 18, 11.8% from 18 to 24, 29.6% from 25 to 44, 17.4% from 45 to 64, and 13.1% 65 or older. The median age was 33 years. For every 100 females, there were 90.8 males. For every 100 females age 18 and over, there were 88.4 males.

The median household income was $36,167 and the median family income was $45,536. Males had a median income of $35,313 versus $21,071 for females. The per capita income for the city was $17,740. About 10.0% of families and 15.8% of the population were below the poverty line, including 19.0% of those under age 18 and 13.5% of those age 65 or over.

== Education ==
Winfield, served by Winfield R-IV School District, has four different schools:

- Primary School (K-2)
- Intermediate School (3–5)
- Middle School (6–8)
- High School (9–12)

== Notable people ==
- Leon Milton Birkhead (1885–1954), minister and pro-democracy propagandist
- Thomas Lavy (1941–1995), farmer and FBI pursuee
