= Lorenzo Gilyard =

American convicted serial killer (born 1950)

- Gilyard in 2007
- Born: Lorenzo Jerome Gilyard, Jr. May 24, 1950 (age 76); Kansas City, Missouri, U.S.
- Other name: "The Kansas City Strangler"
- Status: Incarcerated
- Conviction: First degree murder (6 counts)
- Penalty: Life imprisonment without parole

Details
- Victims: 13+
- Span of crimes: 1977–1993
- Country: United States
- State: Missouri
- Date apprehended: 2004
- Imprisoned at: Crossroads Correctional Center

Lorenzo Jerome Gilyard Jr. (born May 24, 1950), known as The Kansas City Strangler, is an American serial killer. A former trash-company supervisor, Gilyard is believed to have raped and murdered at least 13 women and girls from 1977 to 1993. He was convicted of six counts of first-degree murder on March 16, 2007.

== Early life ==
Lorenzo Jerome Gilyard Jr., was born on May 24, 1950, in Kansas City, Missouri, one of five children born to Lorenzo Gilyard Sr., and his wife Laura (née Brown). From an early age, Lorenzo exhibited aggressive behavior. During his school years, he played on sports teams with his brothers. As he was larger than most of his peers, he physically assaulted smaller children and earned a reputation as a bully.

Due to his lack of discipline, poor academic performance, and chronic absenteeism, Lorenzo was forced to drop out of school after the 10th grade. In the mid-1960s, he met a young woman named Rena Hill, with whom he soon began a relationship. On November 20, 1968, Gilyard and Hill married after the latter learned that she was pregnant. Following the marriage, Gilyard began to indulge in crime and to exhibit deviant sexual behavior towards women.

== Early criminal activity ==
In January 1969, Gilyard was arrested on charges of assaulting and raping a girl he knew, but was later released when a reconciliation agreement was reached between the two parties with the victim retracting the charges after Lorenzo apologized to her. In 1970, Gilyard's father was convicted of rape. Two years later, Gilyard himself was arrested again for raping and assaulting another woman, with the victim claiming that he had choked her into unconsciousness. She identified Gilyard as the culprit from a lineup, but her testimony was considered questionable and the charges were subsequently dropped.

In 1973, Gilyard was arrested for assaulting his wife, with Hill telling police that he had been physically and sexually abusive for all the years they had been married. Ultimately, he was forced to pay a fine and to divorce his wife. In February 1974, Gilyard was arrested for raping a 25-year-old exotic dancer who identified him as her attacker from a photograph, but yet again the charges were dropped when the two parties reached a reconciliation agreement. Five months later, he was arrested again for raping the 13-year-old daughter of a friend on the banks of the Missouri River. As the victim changed her testimony, the rape charges were dropped, but Gilyard was convicted of sexual acts with a minor and received a 9-month sentence in the Jackson County jail. After his release Gilyard married a second time, but his wife soon left him and filed for divorce, claiming that, like Rena Hill, she was beaten and sexually abused by her husband. In the late 1970s, Gilyard married a third time.

In 1979, Gilyard was arrested on charges of assaulting a young couple, raping the girl, and threatening to kill her fiancé. Despite the fact that the victims identified him as their attacker, Gilyard was acquitted by jury verdict at his September 1980 trial due to lack of evidence. A few months later, he was arrested for aggravated assault on his third wife, but got away with an administrative fine and a divorce. In February 1981, Gilyard attacked his ex-wife on two separate occasions; in the first one, he knocked out her front teeth, and in the second, he stabbed her in the hand with an ice pick. He was arrested and charged with third-degree assault, but was let go on a suspended sentence and probation. In November 1981, Gilyard was arrested for theft but was released on $3,500 bail. That same spring, he received a 4-year prison sentence for violating his probation. During his incarceration, his sister, Patricia D. Dixon, a prostitute, was convicted of murdering a client in 1983 and sentenced to 11 years imprisonment in addition to being implicated in the murder of another prostitute.

On January 10, 1983, Gilyard was paroled, but was soon returned to prison after he was arrested in Wyandotte County, Kansas, for making bomb threats. He was released again in late 1985 and in January 1986, he got a job as a garbage man at the Deffenbaugh Disposal Service, where his father worked in the maintenance department. On December 23, 1987, Gilyard was arrested and interrogated as a potential suspect in the murder of 36-year-old Sheila Ingold, during which his blood sample was taken, but he was released due to lack of evidence. In 1991, Gilyard married for a fourth time, and was promoted to company supervisor, granting him control of several garbage-disposal teams in various parts of Kansas City. In July 1996, Gilyard's neighbor went to the police, claiming that she had been sexually harassed by him since September 1995; no charges were brought against him, and the woman moved away soon after. Aside from this incident, Gilyard is not known to have committed any crimes after 1993, with his friends and acquaintances speaking of him in a positive manner.

== Exposure ==
In 2001, the Kansas City Police Department received a multimillion-dollar federal grant aimed at re-examining cold cases using new DNA technology. After examining the blood sample taken from Lorenzo Gilyard, the investigation team conclusively connected him to the murders of six women in the area, including Sheila Ingold, for whose murder he was considered a suspect back in 1987. In addition to this, he was also linked through circumstantial evidence to the killings of at least six more women, killed between April 1977 and January 1993: all of them were between the ages of 15 and 36 and were strangled with various items, including nylon stockings, laces, and wire. Their bodies were found dumped in various areas around Kansas City in landfills, snowdrifts, abandoned buildings, vans, fields, and parking lots. All but one were known prostitutes, nine were found either fully or partially naked, and 11 were sexually assaulted. The murders were considered unrelated until 1994, when police forensically linked two of them to each other. As a result of these findings, Gilyard was arrested on April 16, 2004, and charged with 12 counts of first-degree murder.

== Victims ==
After his arrest, Gilyard was charged with these murders:

- Stacie L. Swofford (17): Last seen alive on April 10, 1977, her body was found a week later at a vacant lot, bearing signs of suffocation. The subsequent investigation determined that Swofford, a transient, sex-worker, had recently arrived in Kansas City.
- Gwendolyn Kizine (15) was found strangled on January 23, 1980, a day after her father had reported her missing. When found, her neck and wrists were tightly wrapped with wire. It was later established that the girl was a prostitute and had last been seen by her parents the week prior.
- Margaret J. Miller (17) was found strangled on May 9, 1982. Like the previous victims, Miller earned an income through sex work.
- Catherine M. Barry (34), whose body found in an abandoned building on March 14, 1986, had a stocking wrapped tightly around her neck. The mentally ill Barry was the only known victim to not be a prostitute but often spent time associating with the marginalized people in society at homeless shelters.
- Naomi M. Kelly (23) was found strangled in a park on August 16, 1986. Kelly was a student at a business school and a single mother raising two children, but the investigators uncovered that she was forced to engage in prostitution due to financial issues. Her killer had used a towel to strangle her, which he had left near the body.
- Debra Sue Blevins (32) was found strangled on November 27, 1986. Her completely nude body was found in some bushes next to a church.
- Ann Barnes (36) was found strangled near the city center on April 17, 1987. Barnes was an exotic dancer and prostitute who worked at a local establishment.
- Kellie A. Ford (20) was found strangled on June 9, 1987. Her almost completely naked body was found dumped at the edge of a cliff near one of city's parks. Ford was later found to be a drug addict and sex worker working in the area.
- Angela Mayhew (19) was found strangled on September 12, 1987. Unlike the other victims, Mayhew was found fully clothed on the side of a road, and despite being a prostitute, no trace of sexual assault was found during the autopsy.
- Sheila Ingold (36), another sex worker, was found strangled near a Kansas City auto shop on November 3, 1987. Ingold's body was found inside an abandoned van Gilyard had pretended to be interested in buying. In this case, her killer had stolen two rings off her corpse.
- Carmeline Renee Hibbs (30) was found strangled on December 19, 1987. Her partially nude body was found in the parking lot of an apartment building.
- Connie Lynne Luther (29) was found strangled on January 11, 1993. Luther, a prostitute, was found in a snowdrift, with a noose made of laces tied around her neck.

On June 23, 2006, following the result of a DNA analysis, Gilyard was charged with an additional murder:

- Helga Kruger (26) was found strangled with a towel in Kansas City in February 1989. An Austrian immigrant, Kruger was a convicted extortionist, but police found no links pointing towards her being in the prostitution business.

Gilyard is also considered a possible suspect in the 1987 murder of 21-year-old store clerk Paula Davis, whose body was found dumped in Ohio.

== Trial ==
In January 2007, Gilyard's attorneys were able to negotiate an agreement with the Jackson County Attorney's Office: In exchange for dropping the death penalty, their client would agree to a trial without a jury, which began on March 5 of that year. Gilyard was tried on seven first-degree murder charges. The prosecution focused mainly on DNA evidence that criminal forensics experts said indicates he had sex with the victims around the time they were killed. "All the victims have several things in common; all were found dead during the same one-and-a-half-year period, all were left in secluded or obstructed locations, all were strangled, all showed signs that they were involved in a struggle, all were missing their shoes, and all but one showed distinct signs of sexual intercourse," prosecution attorney Jim Kanatzar said in opening statements to the court. Throughout the proceedings, Gilyard refused to admit his guilt and insisted on his innocence.

Twelve days later, Gilyard was sentenced to life in prison without parole for the murders of Barry, Kelly, Barnes, Ford, Ingold, and Hibbs. He was acquitted of killing Mayhew, since only human hair and no semen were found on her body, and the results of a DNA analysis of said hair being inconclusive. He initially served his life sentence in Western Missouri Correctional Center, before being transferred to the Crossroads Correctional Center in July 2019.

== Aftermath ==
In 2018, Gilyard received a second wave of infamy after he was interviewed by British journalist and presenter Piers Morgan. During said interview, Gilyard again claimed that he was innocent, and said he had never met any of his victims.

== See also ==
- List of serial killers in the United States
- List of serial killers by number of victims
