= Winfield R-IV School District =

School district in Missouri, U.S.

Address
- 100 8th Street Winfield, Missouri, 63389; United States

District information
- Type: Public
- Grades: PreK–12
- NCES District ID: 2932190

Students and staff
- Students: 1,577
- Teachers: 109.72
- Staff: 116.28
- Student–teacher ratio: 14.37

Other information
- Website: www.winfield.k12.mo.us www.winfieldwarriors.com

Winfield R-IV School District is a school district headquartered in Winfield, Missouri.

The district is in Lincoln County, and includes Winfield, Chain of Rocks, Foley, and Old Monroe. It includes portions of the townships of Burr Oak, Monroe, and Snow Hill.

== History ==
During the COVID-19 pandemic in Missouri, the district took students to virtual learning. The board of trustees decided to resume learning in physical schools in October 2020.

In 2022, Daniel Williams became the superintendent.

Part of a bond that is worth $16,000,000 funded the construction of Winfield Middle School's building in 2022.

New P.A.C. finished by Freise Construction Co. in November 2026. More at:https://winfieldwarriors.com/Article/166230

== Schools ==
- Winfield High School
- Winfield Middle School
- Winfield Intermediate School
- Winfield Primary School
