= Official Manual State of Missouri =

1889-current publication

The Official Manual - State of Missouri (often referred to simply as The Missouri Blue Book) is a biennial publication from the Missouri Secretary of State. The Blue Book was first published in 1889. It contains historical, political, and statistical information about the state of Missouri.

The book cover had traditionally been blue (with the exception of it being red, white and blue in 1976 during the United States Bicentennial) although thanks to the Irish roots of Secretary of State James C. Kirkpatrick it was green from 1969 until he left office in 1985. Secretary of State Judith Moriarty made it mauve for one year in 1993.

In March 2011, the Missouri General Assembly voted to stop hard copy printing of the book but continue publishing it online. At the time, 40,000 copies were printed, with 23,000 going to legislators and the rest being mailed on request. It was 1,500 pages long.

As of July 2024, individuals may order a hardcover copy of the Official Manual for $45 from the Missouri Secretary of State. Previous editions may be purchased at a discounted rate, if available.
