= Cameron, Missouri =

- City
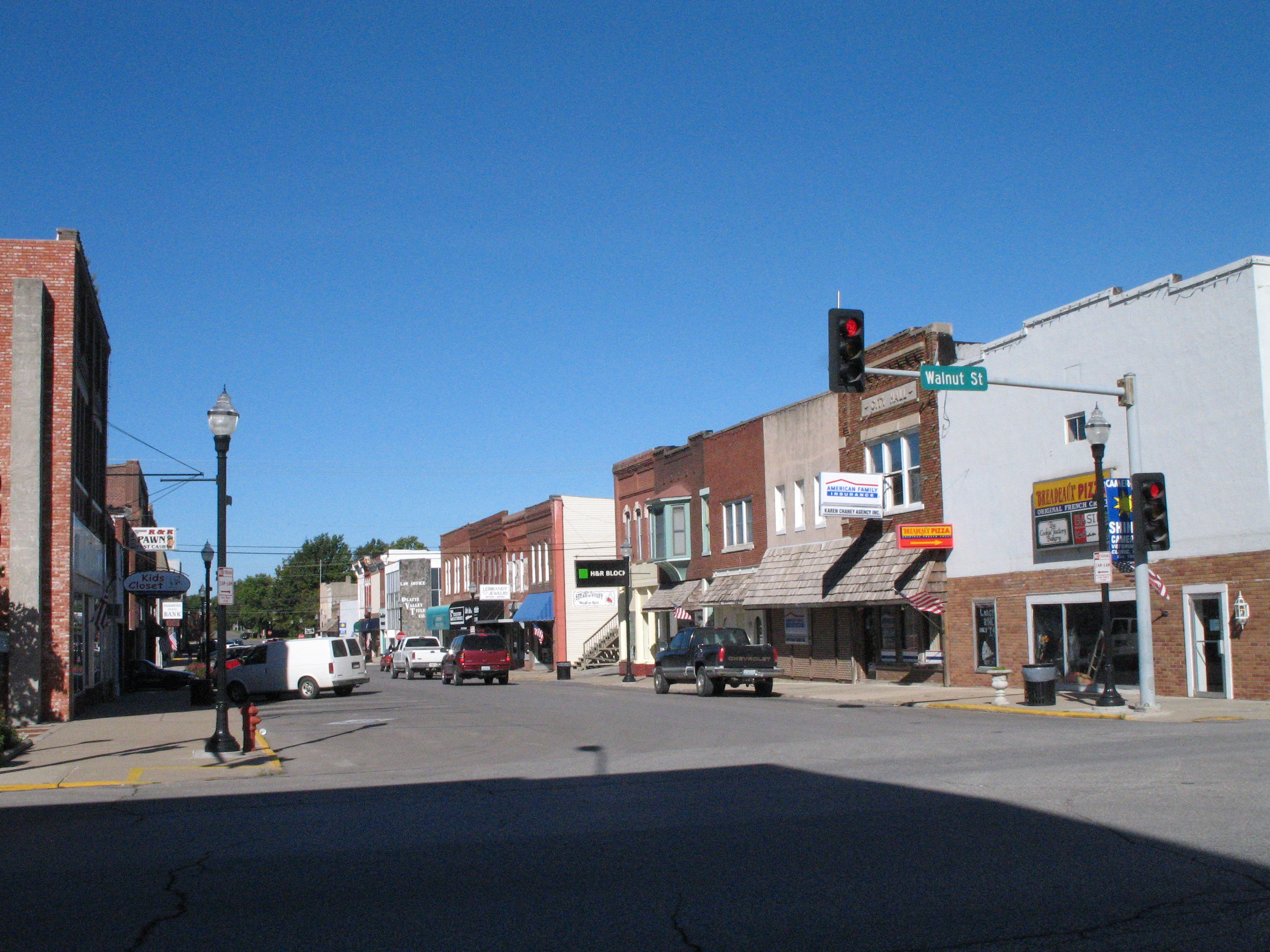
- Downtown Cameron

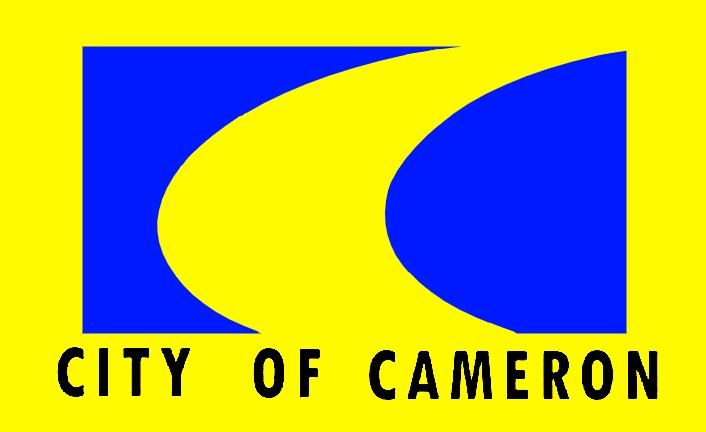
- Flag
- Nickname: Crossroads of the Nation
- Location of Cameron, Missouri

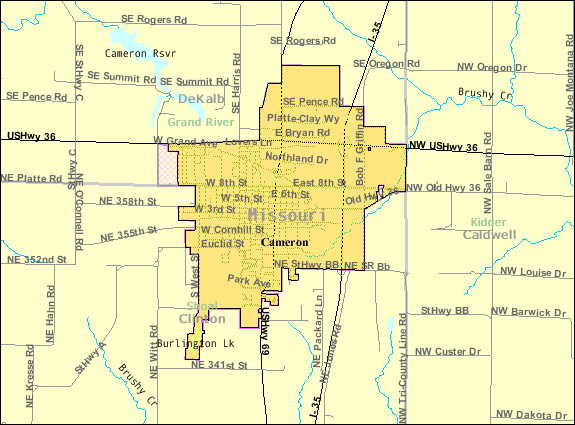
- U.S. Census Map
- Coordinates: 39°44′35″N 94°14′26″W
- Country: United States
- State: Missouri
- Counties: Clinton, DeKalb, Caldwell

Government
  - Type: Council–manager
  - City Manager: Steve Rasmussen

Area
  - Total: 7.13 sq mi (18.47 km^{2})
  - Land: 6.86 sq mi (17.77 km^{2})
  - Water: 0.27 sq mi (0.70 km^{2})
- Elevation: 1,011 ft (308 m)

Population (2020)
  - Total: 8,513
  - Density: 1,240.4/sq mi (478.93/km^{2})
- Time zone: UTC-6 (Central (CST))
  - Summer (DST): UTC-5 (CDT)
- ZIP code: 64429
- Area codes: 816, 975
- FIPS code: 29-10828
- GNIS feature ID: 2393723
- Website: City of Cameron

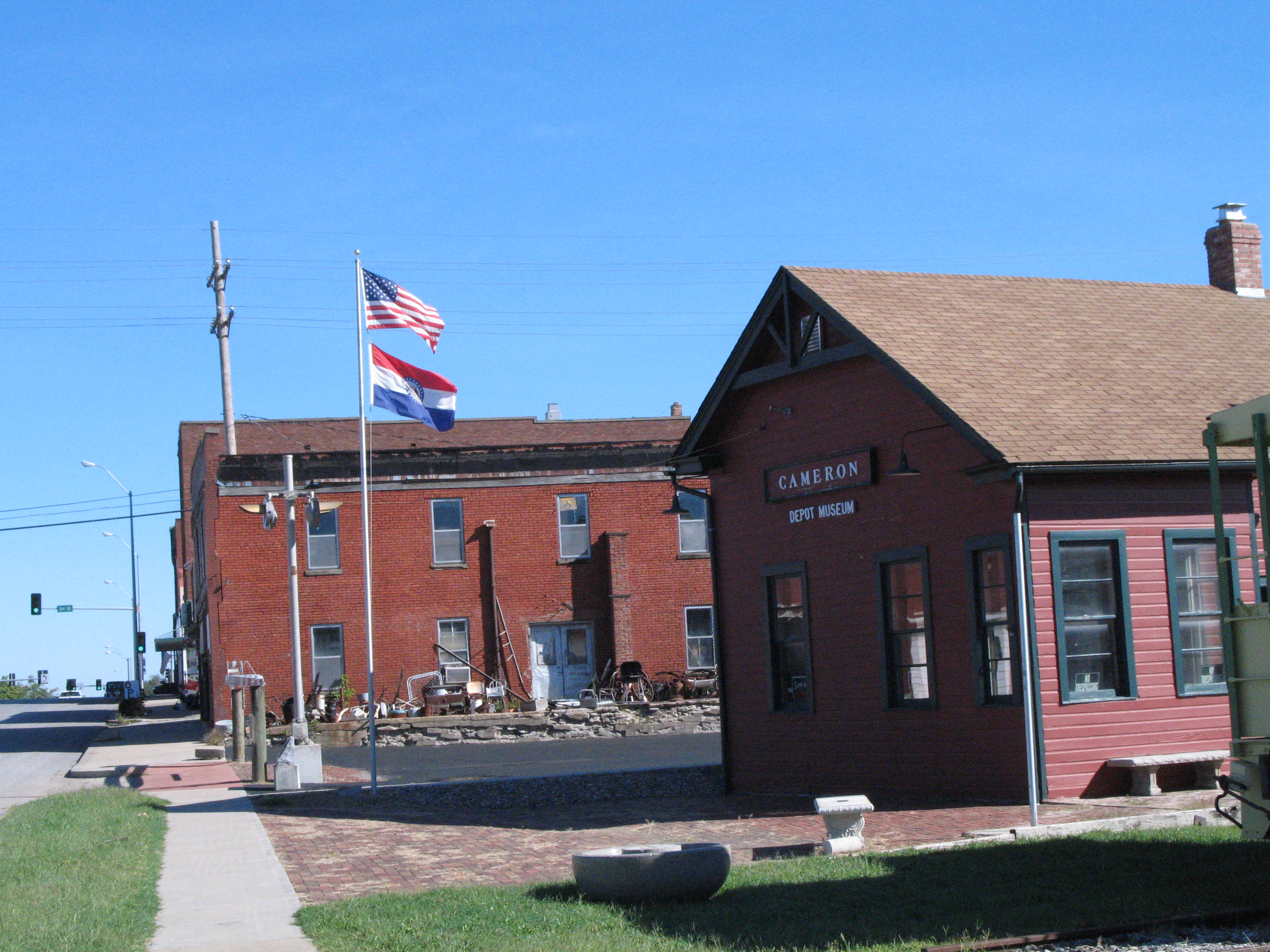
Historic Cameron depot - the Hannibal and St. Joseph Railroad in the "Cameron Cutoff" built the Hannibal Bridge across the Missouri River resulting in Kansas City, Missouri becoming the biggest city in the region.

Cameron is a city in Clinton, DeKalb and Caldwell counties in the U.S. state of Missouri. The population was 8,513 at the 2020 census.

The Clinton and Caldwell counties portion of Cameron are part of the Kansas City Metropolitan Area, while the DeKalb County portion is part of the St. Joseph, Missouri Metropolitan Area. The city as a whole is a part of the Kansas City-Overland Park-Kansas City Combined Statistical Area.

== History ==
In 1854, Samuel McCorkle platted the town of Somerville. When the Hannibal and St. Joseph Railroad (a line whose founders included the father of Mark Twain and which was to deliver the first mail of the Pony Express) proposed coming through the area, the line claimed the area around Somerville was too steep for the rail, so he platted a new community 1.5 miles to the west in what is now Downtown Cameron just one year after the founding of Sommerville in 1855 . Since the Hannibal and St.Joseph Railroad Company could not come through Sommerville McCorkle had Judge Stokes and his son Edmund D. Stokes move all the buildings from Sommerville to the new town of Cameron that was named for the maiden name of his wife, Malinda Cameron. McCorkle Park is still Cameron's centerpiece park.

During the 1860s, as fierce competition raged for the starting point of the First transcontinental railroad, there was competition to get the Hannibal & St. Joseph (which at the time was the farthest west railroad connected to the main rail network) to cross the Missouri River. Omaha, Nebraska was to win the fight when the Union Pacific started the railroad west from there. However, there was no bridge connecting it to the rest of the network.

Kansas City, Missouri was able to convince the railroad to bypass its rivals in St. Joseph, Leavenworth, Kansas, Atchison, Kansas and Parkville, Missouri to create the "Cameron Branch" of the railroad. The construction of the Hannibal Bridge in Kansas City (which was to beat Omaha in any bids to cross the Missouri) was to propel that city into being the dominant city in the region.

Cameron was to enjoy a surge in its population because of the cutoff, with its population growing from 100 in 1859 to 3,000.

Cameron was a college town from 1883 until 1930. Founded as the Cameron Institute, it became Missouri Wesleyan College, operated by the Methodist Church until 1930. A building on the campus would become Cameron High School until being torn down in the 1960s, when a new high school was built on a site a few blocks south; the campus grounds are now used as parking for the nearby football field.

Cameron gained prominence in the 1980s and 1990s after Cameron area resident Bob F. Griffin served more than 15 years as Speaker of the Missouri House of Representatives—the longest of any representative. Among the pork barrel legislation he was to bring to the town were the Missouri Veterans Home and the Western Missouri Correctional Center, the latter of which is the city's largest employer, with 700 employees. A street in the town is named "Bob Griffin Road," though the road remains (as of June 2016) unpaved for most of its length. Griffin eventually served four years in prison for corruption.

Cameron's character has evolved with the intersection of limited access highways. It has expanded to the north towards and past U.S. Route 36 (which in 2007 was proposed to be part of Interstate 72). It has also expanded to the east towards Interstate 35.

== Geography ==
According to the United States Census Bureau, the city has a total area of 6.30 square miles (16.32 km^{2}), of which 6.04 square miles (15.64 km^{2}) is land and 0.26 square miles (0.67 km^{2}) is water.

=== Unusual street grid ===
More than two thirds of the community is in Clinton County, south of NE Platte/8th Street/County Road 56. This area includes the original olde town center, Cameron High School and Veterans Home. The area north of the street in DeKalb includes the Crossroads Correctional Center and Western Missouri Correctional Center, and the shopping centers next to U.S. 36. In addition, portions of the community stretch east to the Caldwell County line. The north–south-east division creates an unusual street grid naming system in which some streets in the northern part of Cameron in DeKalb follow that county's naming structure of Southeast Rogers Road, Southeast Summit Road, Southeast Pence Road, etc. while roads in the south of Cameron in northern Clinton County have road names of Northeast 358th Street, Northeast 348th Street, etc. These latter street names and directions represent a continuation of the street system for Kansas City. With Caldwell County on the east side of Cameron, that means that street name extensions in Caldwell County on the far east side have a prefix of Northwest such as Northwest Old Highway 36. In one instance just outside the city limits, Southeast Oregon Road in Dekalb County becomes Northwest Oregon Road in Caldwell County when heading east from Cameron.

=== Climate ===
Cameron, Missouri

Climate chart (precipitation, max. and min. temperature)
J	F	M	A	M	J	J	A	S	O	N	D
1.1 35 15	1.4 40 19	2.5 52 31	3.7 63 40	5.3 74 53	4.7 83 63	4.6 87 67	4.2 86 65	4.2 79 56	2.9 66 44	2.7 52 32	1.8 40 21
- █ Average max. and min. temperatures in °F
- █ Precipitation totals in inches
Metric conversion
J	F	M	A	M	J	J	A	S	O	N	D
28 2 −9	36 4 −7	64 11 −1	94 17 4	135 23 12	119 28 17	117 31 19	107 30 18	107 26 13	74 19 7	69 11 0	46 4 −6
- █ Average max. and min. temperatures in °C
- █ Precipitation totals in mm

Cameron experiences a humid continental climate, with cold and snowy winters and hot and humid summers. Extreme weather, such as thunderstorms and tornadoes, can and have occurred in Cameron. Snow falls during the winter months, while late spring and early summer are the wettest time of the year.

Climate data for Cameron, Missouri
Month	Jan	Feb	Mar	Apr	May	Jun	Jul	Aug	Sep	Oct	Nov	Dec	Year
Record high °F (°C)	72 (22)	79 (26)	86 (30)	92 (33)	97 (36)	102 (39)	109 (43)	108 (42)	100 (38)	96 (36)	82 (28)	72 (22)	109 (43)
Mean daily maximum °F (°C)	35.1 (1.7)	40.3 (4.6)	52.1 (11.2)	63.4 (17.4)	73.6 (23.1)	83.0 (28.3)	87.3 (30.7)	85.5 (29.7)	78.5 (25.8)	66.2 (19.0)	51.5 (10.8)	39.7 (4.3)	63.0 (17.2)
Mean daily minimum °F (°C)	15.1 (−9.4)	19.1 (−7.2)	30.7 (−0.7)	39.9 (4.4)	52.7 (11.5)	63.1 (17.3)	67.1 (19.5)	64.9 (18.3)	55.5 (13.1)	43.9 (6.6)	31.7 (−0.2)	21.2 (−6.0)	42.1 (5.6)
Record low °F (°C)	−27 (−33)	−27 (−33)	−17 (−27)	7 (−14)	25 (−4)	34 (1)	43 (6)	40 (4)	27 (−3)	14 (−10)	−10 (−23)	−27 (−33)	−27 (−33)
Average precipitation inches (mm)	1.14 (29)	1.40 (36)	2.52 (64)	3.72 (94)	5.30 (135)	4.69 (119)	4.64 (118)	4.22 (107)	4.24 (108)	2.91 (74)	2.66 (68)	1.76 (45)	39.20 (996)
Average snowfall inches (cm)	5.5 (14)	8.2 (21)	1.9 (4.8)	0.4 (1.0)	0.4 (1.0)	0 (0)	0 (0)	0 (0)	0 (0)	0 (0)	0.9 (2.3)	4.4 (11)	21.7 (55)
Source: NOAA

== Demographics ==
Historical population
Census	Pop.	Note	%±
1870	1,428		—
1880	2,109		47.7%
1890	2,917		38.3%
1900	2,979		2.1%
1910	2,980		0.0%
1920	3,248		9.0%
1930	3,507		8.0%
1940	3,615		3.1%
1950	3,570		−1.2%
1960	3,674		2.9%
1970	3,960		7.8%
1980	4,519		14.1%
1990	4,831		6.9%
2000	8,312		72.1%
2010	9,933		19.5%
2020	8,513		−14.3%
U.S. Decennial Census

=== 2020 census ===
As of the 2020 census, Cameron had a population of 8,513. The population density was 1,241.0 per square mile (479.1/km^{2}). The median age was 38.7 years. 20.0% of residents were under the age of 18 and 17.6% of residents were 65 years of age or older. For every 100 females there were 143.2 males, and for every 100 females age 18 and over there were 157.2 males age 18 and over.

99.1% of residents lived in urban areas, while 0.9% lived in rural areas.

There were 2,664 households in Cameron, of which 32.9% had children under the age of 18 living in them. Of all households, 41.3% were married-couple households, 16.7% were households with a male householder and no spouse or partner present, and 32.6% were households with a female householder and no spouse or partner present. About 33.4% of all households were made up of individuals and 16.3% had someone living alone who was 65 years of age or older.

There were 2,925 housing units, of which 8.9% were vacant. The homeowner vacancy rate was 1.3% and the rental vacancy rate was 9.9%.

Racial composition as of the 2020 census
Race	Number	Percent
White	7,234	85.0%
Black or African American	688	8.1%
American Indian and Alaska Native	35	0.4%
Asian	74	0.9%
Native Hawaiian and Other Pacific Islander	0	0.0%
Some other race	57	0.7%
Two or more races	425	5.0%
Hispanic or Latino (of any race)	226	2.7%

=== Income and poverty ===
The 2016–2020 5-year American Community Survey estimates show that the median household income was $57,855 (with a margin of error of +/- $9,137) and the median family income was $65,047 (+/- $6,533). Males had a median income of $35,053 (+/- $3,617) versus $27,485 (+/- $4,462) for females. The median income for those above 16 years old was $30,823 (+/- $2,389). Approximately, 5.5% of families and 10.3% of the population were below the poverty line, including 15.9% of those under the age of 18 and 4.1% of those ages 65 or over.

=== 2010 census ===
As of the census of 2010, there were 9,933 people, 2,605 households, and 1,562 families residing in the city. The population density was 1,644.5 inhabitants per square mile (634.9/km^{2}). There were 2,951 housing units at an average density of 488.6 per square mile (188.6/km^{2}). The racial makeup of the city was 82.9% White, 14.8% African American, 0.5% Native American, 0.5% Asian, 0.3% from other races, and 1.0% from two or more races. Hispanic or Latino of any race were 2.0% of the population.

There were 2,605 households, of which 33.8% had children under the age of 18 living with them, 42.6% were married couples living together, 12.4% had a female householder with no husband present, 5.0% had a male householder with no wife present, and 40.0% were non-families. 35.0% of all households were made up of individuals, and 16.1% had someone living alone who was 65 years of age or older. The average household size was 2.36 and the average family size was 3.04.

The median age in the city was 37.4 years. 17.1% of residents were under the age of 18; 9.2% were between the ages of 18 and 24; 36.2% were from 25 to 44; 24% were from 45 to 64; and 13.5% were 65 years of age or older. The gender makeup of the city was 66.0% male and 34.0% female.

=== 2000 census ===
As of the census of 2000, there were 8,312 people, 2,263 households, and 1,434 families residing in the city. The population density was 1,560.6 inhabitants per square mile (602.6/km^{2}). There were 2,540 housing units at an average density of 476.9 per square mile (184.1/km^{2}). The racial makeup of the city was 84.90% White, 12.64% African American, 0.60% Native American, 0.30% Asian, 0.25% from other races, and 1.30% from two or more races. Hispanic or Latino of any race were 1.37% of the population.

There were 2,263 households, out of which 33.5% had children under the age of 18 living with them, 48.3% were married couples living together, 11.6% had a female householder with no husband present, and 36.6% were non-families. 32.0% of all households were made up of individuals, and 16.2% had someone living alone who was 65 years of age or older. The average household size was 2.39 and the average family size was 3.03.

In the city the population was spread out, with 18.5% under the age of 18, 9.1% from 18 to 24, 40.2% from 25 to 44, 18.3% from 45 to 64, and 13.9% who were 65 years of age or older. The median age was 37 years. For every 100 females, there were 171.6 males. For every 100 females age 18 and over, there were 189.0 males.

The median income for a household in the city was $32,136, and the median income for a family was $40,540. Males had a median income of $29,529 versus $19,777 for females. The per capita income for the city was $12,375. About 9.8% of families and 12.0% of the population were below the poverty line, including 10.9% of those under age 18 and 19.2% of those age 65 or over.

== Government ==
Cameron uses a council–manager form of government with a city manager appointed by the city council. As of February 2020, the current city manager is Steve Rasmussen.

== Transportation ==
=== Highways ===
- I-35, Cameron accessible via exits 52 and 54
- I-35 BL as Evergreen Street and Walnut Street, and concurrent with US-36
- US 36 concurrent with I-35 Bus. from Walnut Street to Monarch Highway
- US 36 Bus. as Grand Avenue and Walnut Street
- US 69 as Walnut Street
- Route 110 as Chicago-Kansas City Expressway

=== Transit ===
Intercity bus service to the city is provided by Jefferson Lines.

== Education ==
All portions of Cameron are in Cameron R-I School District. Cameron R-I School District operates one elementary school, one intermediate school, one middle school, and Cameron High School.

The town has a lending library, the Cameron Public Library, with 35,000 items in its collection.

== Notable people ==
- Joseph Irwin France, U.S. Senator, representing Maryland
- Don Gillis, composer and conductor
- DeWitt Clarke Jennings, actor
- George Smith, lieutenant governor of Missouri
