= Shawn Hornbeck Foundation =

Foundation for missing children

The Shawn Hornbeck Foundation was a non-profit charitable organization based in Richwoods, Missouri, devoted to the search for and rescue of abducted children. It ran the Shawn Hornbeck Search and Rescue Team.

The rescue team was founded by Pam and Craig Akers following the disappearance of their son Shawn Hornbeck (born July 17, 1991). Hornbeck was 11 years old on October 6, 2002, when he was kidnapped while riding his bicycle near his home in Richwoods, Missouri. Shawn Hornbeck was missing for over four years before being discovered on January 12, 2007, along with another teenage boy, Ben Ownby. They had been kidnapped by Michael J. Devlin.

The Shawn Hornbeck Search and Rescue Team was a member of the National Association for Search and Rescue (NASAR) and a member of the Search and Rescue Council of Missouri (SARCOM). It was also involved with the National Search Dog Association.

== History ==
The Akerses founded the Shawn Hornbeck Search and Rescue Team following the disappearance of their son Shawn Hornbeck. Hornbeck was 11 years old when he was kidnapped while riding his bicycle near his Richwoods, Missouri home on October 6, 2002.

Shortly after Hornbeck's disappearance, his parents appeared on The Montel Williams Show, where self-described psychic Sylvia Browne erroneously told them that their son was dead. Browne also described the abduction, telling them several things about the abductor that later proved to be incorrect.

Hornbeck was missing for over four years before being discovered on January 12, 2007. Police were searching for 13-year-old Ben Ownby of Beaufort, Missouri (about 40 mi (64 km) away from Richwoods, Missouri), who had gone missing earlier that week. Aided by a descriptive tip from teenager Mitchell Hults of Beaufort, police searched Michael J. Devlin's apartment in Kirkwood, Missouri (about 50 mi (80 km) from Beaufort). Hornbeck and Ownby were both found alive there.

== Prosecution ==
In June 2007, Devlin was charged with 80 counts in the abductions and molestations of Hornbeck and Ownby. On October 8, 2007, Devlin pleaded guilty to all charges filed against him and was sentenced to life imprisonment.

== See also ==
- Laura Recovery Center
- Polly Klaas Foundation
- Texas EquuSearch
