= Foley, Missouri =

- City
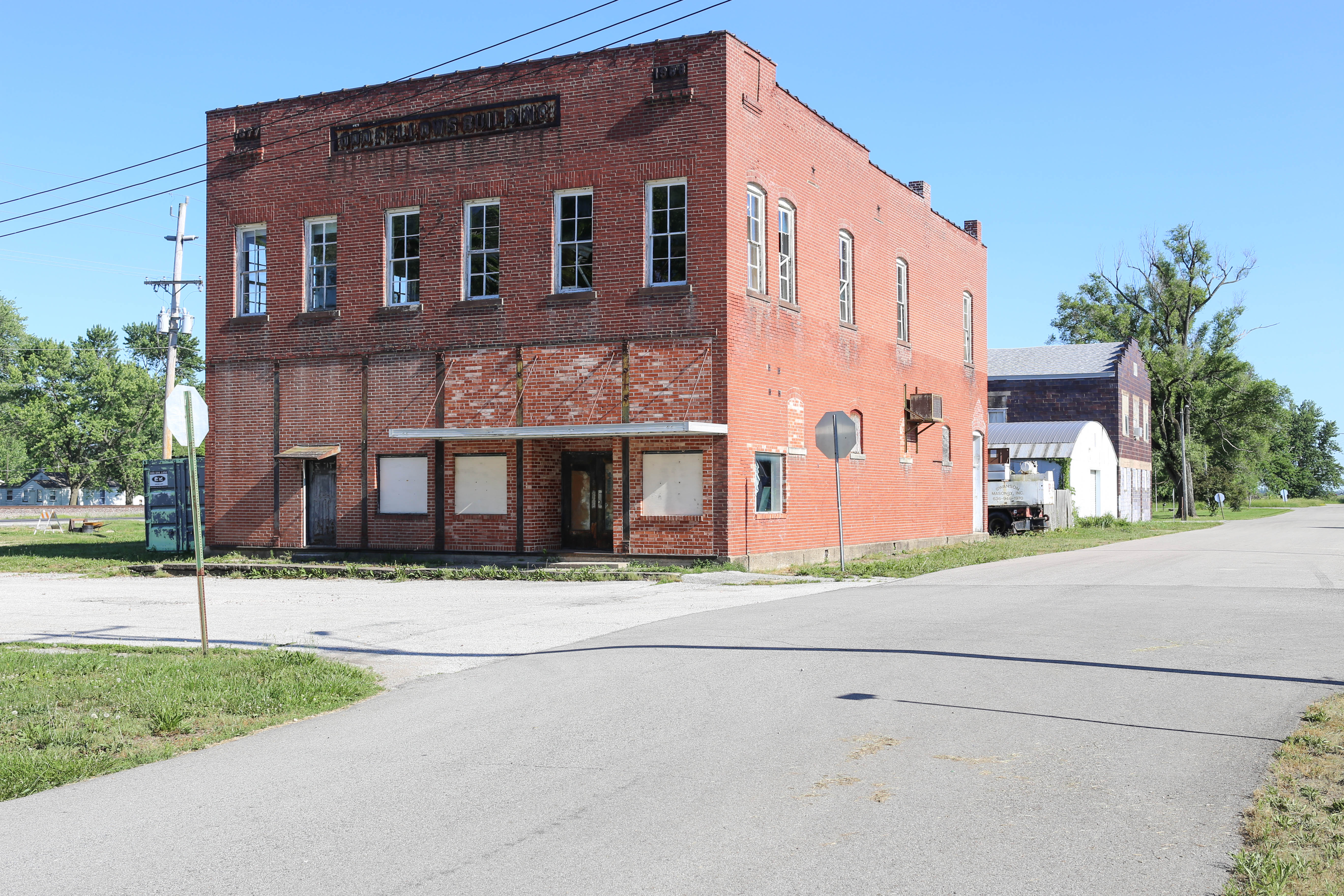
- Odd Fellows Building in Foley, Missouri in June 2018

- Location of Foley, Missouri
- Coordinates: 39°02′45″N 90°44′29″W
- Country: United States
- State: Missouri
- County: Lincoln

Area
  - Total: 0.20 sq mi (0.51 km^{2})
  - Land: 0.20 sq mi (0.51 km^{2})
  - Water: 0 sq mi (0.00 km^{2})
- Elevation: 443 ft (135 m)

Population (2020)
  - Total: 89
  - Density: 453.9/sq mi (175.25/km^{2})
- Time zone: UTC-6 (Central (CST))
  - Summer (DST): UTC-5 (CDT)
- ZIP code: 63347
- Area code: 636
- FIPS code: 29-24886
- GNIS feature ID: 2394780
- Website: www.cityoffoleymo.com

Foley is a city in Lincoln County, Missouri, United States. As of the 2020 census, Foley had a population of 89.

== History ==
Foley was platted in 1879. Some say the town was named after Addison Foley, the original owner of the town site, while others believe the community has the name of one Miss Addie Foley, another early settler. A post office called Foley has been in operation since 1880.

== Geography ==
According to the United States Census Bureau, the city has a total area of 0.14 square miles (0.36 km^{2}), all land.

== Demographics ==
Historical population
Census	Pop.	Note	%±
1880	39		—
1910	227		—
1920	237		4.4%
1930	200		−15.6%
1940	197		−1.5%
1950	203		3.0%
1960	183		−9.9%
1970	224		22.4%
1980	216		−3.6%
1990	209		−3.2%
2000	178		−14.8%
2010	161		−9.6%
2020	89		−44.7%
U.S. Decennial Census

=== 2010 census ===
As of the census of 2010, there were 161 people, 56 households, and 39 families living in the city. The population density was 1,150.0 inhabitants per square mile (444.0/km^{2}). There were 69 housing units at an average density of 492.9 per square mile (190.3/km^{2}). The racial makeup of the city was 96.3% White, 2.5% Asian, and 1.2% from two or more races. Hispanic or Latino of any race were 5.0% of the population.

There were 56 households, of which 41.1% had children under the age of 18 living with them, 41.1% were married couples living together, 21.4% had a female householder with no husband present, 7.1% had a male householder with no wife present, and 30.4% were non-families. 21.4% of all households were made up of individuals, and 7.2% had someone living alone who was 65 years of age or older. The average household size was 2.88 and the average family size was 3.23.

The median age in the city was 31.9 years. 27.3% of residents were under the age of 18; 11.9% were between the ages of 18 and 24; 28% were from 25 to 44; 24.3% were from 45 to 64; and 8.7% were 65 years of age or older. The gender makeup of the city was 49.7% male and 50.3% female.

=== 2000 census ===
As of the census of 2000, there were 178 people, 65 households, and 44 families living in the city. The population density was 1,214.9 inhabitants per square mile (469.1/km^{2}). There were 74 housing units at an average density of 505.1 per square mile (195.0/km^{2}). The racial makeup of the city was 94.38% White, 1.12% African American, 0.56% Asian, and 3.93% from two or more races.

There were 65 households, out of which 43.1% had children under the age of 18 living with them, 40.0% were married couples living together, 16.9% had a female householder with no husband present, and 32.3% were non-families. 24.6% of all households were made up of individuals, and 9.2% had someone living alone who was 65 years of age or older. The average household size was 2.74 and the average family size was 3.27.

In the city the population was spread out, with 33.7% under the age of 18, 5.1% from 18 to 24, 35.4% from 25 to 44, 15.2% from 45 to 64, and 10.7% who were 65 years of age or older. The median age was 31 years. For every 100 females, there were 100.0 males. For every 100 females age 18 and over, there were 107.0 males.

The median income for a household in the city was $29,000, and the median income for a family was $37,750. Males had a median income of $24,250 versus $20,000 for females. The per capita income for the city was $9,902. About 13.3% of families and 16.9% of the population were below the poverty line, including 15.5% of those under the age of eighteen and none of those 65 or over.

== Education ==
The area school district is Winfield R-IV School District.
