= Butcher Creek =

Butcher Creek may refer to:

- Butcher Creek (Missouri), a stream in Missouri
- Butcher Creek (Perkins County, South Dakota)
- Butcher Creek (Meade and Ziebach counties, South Dakota)
- Butchers Creek, a locality in Queensland, Australia
- Butcher Creek, a village in the 2018 video game "Red Dead Redemption 2".
