= Butcher Creek (Missouri) =

Stream in the U.S. state of Missouri

Butcher Creek is a stream in southern Lincoln County in the U.S. state of Missouri. It is a tributary to Crooked Creek.

The stream headwaters arise at 38°54′50″N 90°56′08″W at an elevation of approximately 560 feet. The stream flows to the east-northeast passing under U.S. Route 61 approximately 1.5 miles south of Moscow Mills. The stream continues to the northeast to its confluence with Crooked Creek about one half mile upstream of Crooked Creek's confluence with the Cuivre River. The confluence is at 38°55′47″N 90°53′18″W at an elevation of 436 feet.

Butcher Creek is a corruption of Buecher, the German surname of a pioneer citizen.

== See also ==
- List of rivers of Missouri
