= Butcher Creek (Perkins County, South Dakota) =

Stream in South Dakota, United States

Coordinates: 45°37′57″N 102°20′43″W

Butcher Creek is a stream in the U.S. state of South Dakota.

Some say the creek has the name of Charles "Butch" Benard, an early settler, while others believe it has the name of William "Butch" Butcher, a cook at a local ranch.

== See also ==
- List of rivers of South Dakota
