= Butcher Creek (Meade and Ziebach counties, South Dakota) =

Stream in South Dakota, United States

Coordinates: 44°51′31″N 101°57′25″W

Butcher Creek is a stream in the U.S. state of South Dakota.

Butcher Creek received its name from a skirmish between Indians in which a warrior was "butchered up".

== See also ==
- List of rivers of South Dakota
