= St. Charles County, Missouri =

County in Missouri, United States

- County
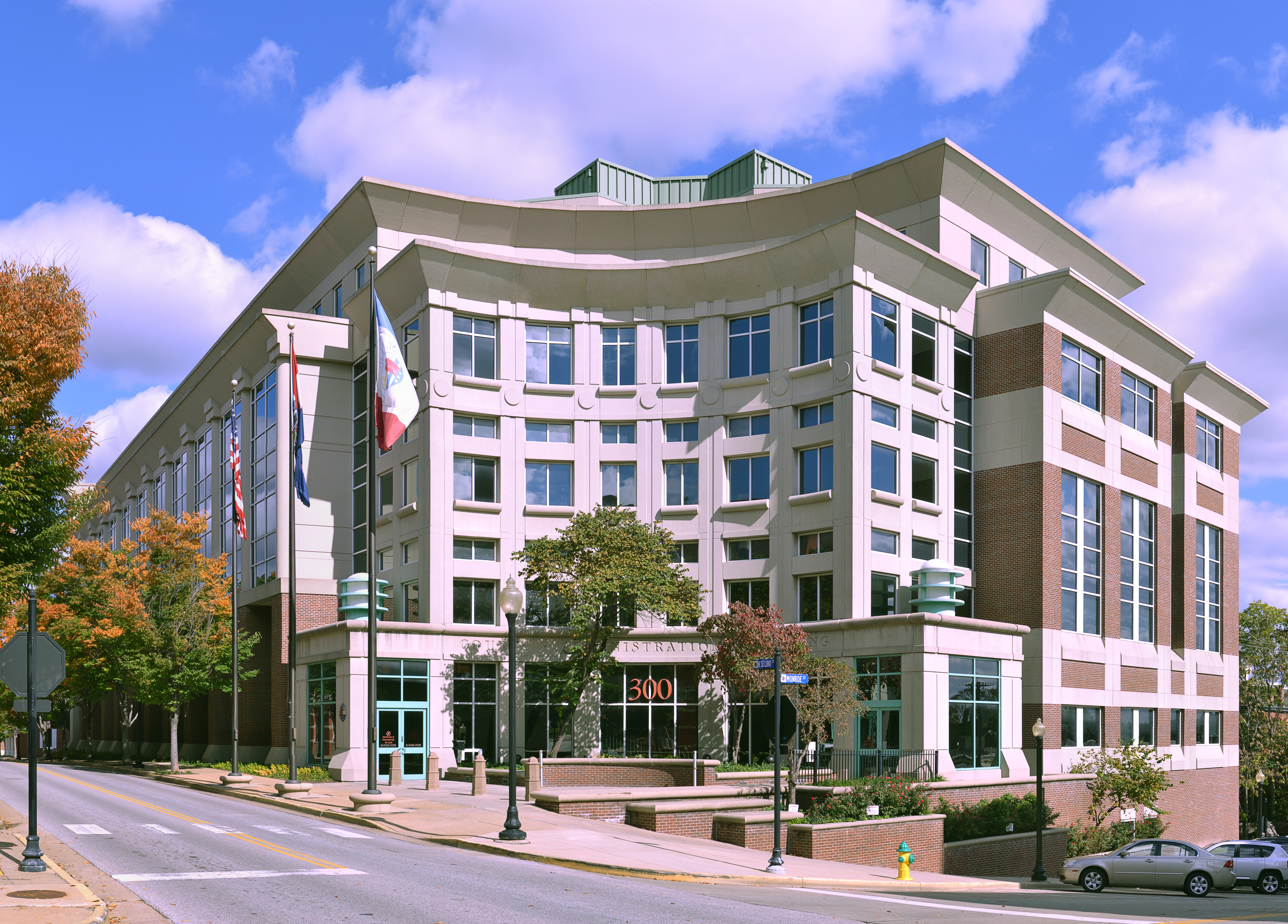
- St. Charles County Courthouse in St. Charles

- Flag

- Location within the U.S. state of Missouri
- Coordinates: 38°45′36″N 90°37′00″W
- Country: United States
- State: Missouri
- Founded: October 1, 1812
- Named for: Charles Borromeo
- Seat: St. Charles
- Largest city: O'Fallon

Government
  - County executive: Steve Ehlmann (R)

Area
  - Total: 593 sq mi (1,540 km^{2})
  - Land: 560 sq mi (1,500 km^{2})
  - Water: 32 sq mi (83 km^{2}) 5.4%

Population (2020)
  - Total: 405,262
  - Estimate (2025): 426,499 ▲
  - Density: 720/sq mi (280/km^{2})
- Time zone: UTC−6 (Central)
  - Summer (DST): UTC−5 (CDT)
- Congressional districts: 2nd, 3rd
- Website: www.sccmo.org

St. Charles County is located in the central eastern part of the U.S. state of Missouri. As of the 2020 census, the population was 405,262, making it Missouri's third-most populous county. Its county seat is St. Charles. The county was organized October 1, 1812, and named for Saint Charles Borromeo, an Italian cardinal.

St. Charles County is part of the St. Louis, MO-IL Metropolitan Statistical Area and contains many of the city's northwestern suburbs. The wealthiest county in Missouri, St. Charles County is one of the nation's fastest-growing counties.

St. Charles County includes a part of the Augusta AVA, an area of vineyards and wineries designated by the federal government in 1980 as the first American Viticultural Area. The county's rural outer edge along the south-facing bluffs above the Missouri River, is also part of the broader Missouri Rhineland.

== History ==
The County of St. Charles was originally called the District of St. Charles and had no definite limits until 1816 to 1818 when neighboring counties were formed. The borders of St. Charles are the same today as they were in 1818.

== Geography ==
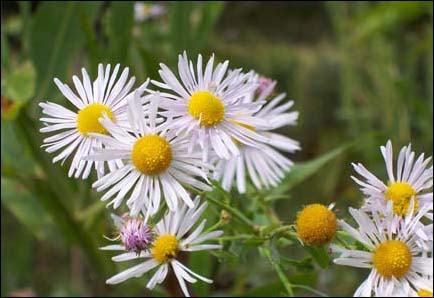
St. Charles County is the only known habitat of the threatened decurrent false aster in Missouri.

According to the U.S. Census Bureau, the county has a total area of 593 square miles (1,540 km^{2}), of which 560 square miles (1,500 km^{2}) is land and 32 square miles (83 km^{2}) (5.4%) is water.

The highest elevation is 901 feet (275 m) northwest of Augusta near Femme Osage Creek headwaters.

=== Adjacent counties ===
- Lincoln County (northwest)
- Calhoun County, Illinois (north)
- Jersey County, Illinois (northeast)
- Madison County, Illinois (east)
- St. Louis County (southeast)
- Franklin County (south)
- Warren County (west)

=== Major highways ===
- I-64 – Major freeway in the western portion of the county. Originally U.S. Route 40, the highway was upgraded to Interstate standards in the late 2000s. The highway was re-signed as Interstate 64 from the Daniel Boone Bridge to Interstate 70 in Wentzville in 2009.
- I-70 – The major east–west thoroughfare in the county. It is mostly a six-lane freeway in the county, but there are sections in St. Charles and St. Peters where the Interstate widens to 11 lanes of traffic.
- Interstate 70 Business
- US-40
- US-61
- US-67
- Rte-79
- Rte-94
- Rte-364 – A freeway in the southern and central portions of the county that begins at Interstate 270 in western St. Louis County and ends at Interstate 64 in Lake St. Louis.
- Rte-370 – A six-lane freeway that connects Interstate 70 in St. Peters and Interstate 270 in northwest St. Louis County.

=== National protected area ===
- Two Rivers National Wildlife Refuge (part)

== Climate ==
Saint Charles County

Climate chart (precipitation, max. and min. temperature)
J	F	M	A	M	J	J	A	S	O	N	D
2.6 36 25	3.2 45 30	3.7 55 36	8.5 75 50	4.4 77 57	4.9 90 66	1.9 88 70	4.2 86 68	4 82 57	3.6 72 45	1.8 57 41	3 39 25
- █ Average max. and min. temperatures in °F
- █ Precipitation totals in inches
Metric conversion
J	F	M	A	M	J	J	A	S	O	N	D
66 2 −4	81 7 −1	94 13 2	216 24 10	112 25 14	124 32 19	48 31 21	107 30 20	102 28 14	91 22 7	46 14 5	76 4 −4
- █ Average max. and min. temperatures in °C
- █ Precipitation totals in mm

== Demographics ==
Historical population
Census	Pop.	Note	%±
1810	3,505		—
1820	3,970		13.3%
1830	4,320		8.8%
1840	7,911		83.1%
1850	11,454		44.8%
1860	16,523		44.3%
1870	21,304		28.9%
1880	23,065		8.3%
1890	22,977		−0.4%
1900	24,474		6.5%
1910	24,695		0.9%
1920	22,828		−7.6%
1930	24,354		6.7%
1940	25,562		5.0%
1950	29,834		16.7%
1960	52,970		77.5%
1970	92,954		75.5%
1980	144,107		55.0%
1990	212,907		47.7%
2000	283,883		33.3%
2010	360,485		27.0%
2020	405,262		12.4%
2025 (est.)	426,499	▲	5.2%
U.S. Decennial Census; 1790–1960 1900–1990; 1990–2000 2010–2020

=== 2020 census ===
As of the 2020 census, the county had a population of 405,262, a median age of 39.3 years, 23.4% of residents under the age of 18, and 16.1% of residents 65 years of age or older. For every 100 females there were 95.6 males, and for every 100 females age 18 and over there were 93.3 males. The population density was 643 inhabitants per square mile (248/km^{2}).

The racial makeup of the county was 83.8% White, 5.2% Black or African American, 0.2% American Indian and Alaska Native, 2.8% Asian, 0.1% Native Hawaiian and Pacific Islander, 1.5% from some other race, and 6.5% from two or more races. Hispanic or Latino residents of any race comprised 4.0% of the population.

94.3% of residents lived in urban areas, while 5.7% lived in rural areas.

There were 154,851 households in the county, of which 32.8% had children under the age of 18 living with them and 22.9% had a female householder with no spouse or partner present. About 23.7% of all households were made up of individuals and 9.8% had someone living alone who was 65 years of age or older.

There were 161,144 housing units, of which 3.9% were vacant. Among occupied housing units, 78.8% were owner-occupied and 21.2% were renter-occupied. The homeowner vacancy rate was 0.8% and the rental vacancy rate was 7.1%.

=== Racial and ethnic composition ===
St. Charles County, Missouri – Racial and ethnic composition Note: the US Census treats Hispanic/Latino as an ethnic category. This table excludes Latinos from the racial categories and assigns them to a separate category. Hispanics/Latinos may be of any race.
Race / Ethnicity (NH = Non-Hispanic)	Pop 1980	Pop 1990	Pop 2000	Pop 2010	Pop 2020	% 1980	% 1990	% 2000	% 2010	% 2020
White alone (NH)	140,241	203,705	266,158	321,078	335,879	97.32%	95.68%	93.76%	89.07%	82.88%
Black or African American alone (NH)	1,911	4,917	7,573	14,827	20,672	1.33%	2.31%	2.67%	4.11%	5.10%
Native American or Alaska Native alone (NH)	274	509	596	692	623	0.19%	0.24%	0.21%	0.19%	0.15%
Asian alone (NH)	510	1,394	2,397	7,789	11,068	0.35%	0.65%	0.84%	2.16%	2.73%
Native Hawaiian or Pacific Islander alone (NH)	x	x	61	153	199	x	x	0.02%	0.04%	0.05%
Other race alone (NH)	222	74	224	427	1,377	0.15%	0.03%	0.08%	0.12%	0.34%
Mixed race or Multiracial (NH)	x	x	2,698	5,536	19,433	x	x	0.95%	1.54%	4.80%
Hispanic or Latino (any race)	949	2,308	4,176	9,983	16,011	0.66%	1.08%	1.47%	2.77%	3.95%
Total	144,107	212,907	283,883	360,485	405,262	100.00%	100.00%	100.00%	100.00%	100.00%

=== 2000 census ===
There were 101,663 households, out of which 40.50% had children under the age of 18 living with them, 63.20% were married couples living together, 9.20% have a woman whose husband does not live with her, and 24.20% were non-families. 19.40% of all households were made up of individuals, and 5.90% had someone living alone who was 65 years of age or older. The average household size was 2.76 and the average family size was 3.18.

In the county, the population was spread out in age, with 29.00% under the age of 18, 8.20% from 18 to 24, 32.60% from 25 to 44, 21.60% from 45 to 64, and 8.80% who were 65 years of age or older. The median age was 34 years. For every 100 females there were 97.10 males. For every 100 females age 18 and over, there were 94.10 males.

The median income for a household in the county was $71,458, and the median income for a family was $64,415. Males had a median income of $44,528 versus $29,405 for females. The per capita income for the county was $23,592. 4.00% of the population and 2.80% of families were below the poverty line. Out of the total people living in poverty, 4.90% are under the age of 18 and 5.10% are 65 or older.

St. Charles County has had one of the fastest-growing populations in the state for many decades, with 55% growth in the 1970s, 48% in the 1980s, 33% in the 1990s, and another 27% in the 2000s. The county sits at a cross-section of industry, as well as extensive retail and some agriculture. With the Missouri River on the south and east and the Mississippi River on the north, the county is bisected east to west by Interstate 70. After St. Charles Airport closed in 2010, the county has one remaining small airport, St. Charles County Smartt Airport. Two ferries cross the Mississippi River from St. Charles County.

== Education ==
=== Public schools ===
School districts include:

- Fort Zumwalt R-II School District
- Francis Howell R-III School District
- Orchard Farm R-V School District
- St. Charles R-VI School District
- Washington School District
- Wentzville R-IV School District

High schools (all grades 9–12):

- Fort Zumwalt District

- Fort Zumwalt East High School – St. Peters
- Fort Zumwalt North High School – O'Fallon
- Fort Zumwalt South High School – St. Peters
- Fort Zumwalt West High School – O'Fallon

- Francis Howell District

- Francis Howell Central High School – Cottleville
- Francis Howell North High School – St. Peters
- Francis Howell High School – Weldon Spring Heights

- Orchard Farm District

- Orchard Farm High School – St. Charles

- St. Charles District

- St. Charles High School – St. Charles
- St. Charles West High School – St. Charles

- Wentzville District

- Liberty High School – Lake St. Louis
- Emil E. Holt High School – Wentzville
- Timberland High School – Wentzville

=== Private schools ===
- Academy of the Sacred Heart – St. Charles – (PK-08) – Roman Catholic
- All Saints School – St. Peters – (K-08) – Roman Catholic
- Assumption Catholic Grade School – O'Fallon – (K-08) – Roman Catholic
- Christian High School– O'Fallon and St. Peters– (PK-12) – Non-denominational Christian
- Duchesne High School– St. Charles– (09-12)– Roman Catholic
- First Baptist Christian Academy – O'Fallon – (PK-07) – Non-denominational Christian
- Foristell Baptist Academy – Foristell – (K-09) – Baptist
- Hope Montessori Academy – Lake St. Louis – (PK-K) – Nonsectarian
- Immaculate Conception Catholic School – Dardenne Prairie – (K-08) – Roman Catholic
- Immanuel Lutheran School – St. Charles – (PK-08) – Lutheran
- Immanuel Lutheran School – Wentzville – (PK-08) – Lutheran
- Liberty Classical School – O'Fallon – (07-12) – Non-denominational Christian
- Lutheran High School of St. Charles County – St. Peters – (09-12) – Lutheran
- Messiah Lutheran School – Weldon Spring – (PK-08) – Lutheran
- Mid Rivers Seventh-day Adventist School – St. Peters – (03-08) – Seventh-day Adventist
- St. Charles Borromeo – St. Charles – (K-08) – Roman Catholic
- St. Cletus School – St. Charles – (K-08) – Roman Catholic
- St. Dominic High School – O'Fallon – (09-12) – Roman Catholic
- St. Elizabeth St. Robert Regional School – St. Charles – (PK-08) – Roman Catholic
- St. Joseph School – Cottleville – (K-08) – Roman Catholic
- St. Joseph School – Wentzville – (PK-08) – Roman Catholic
- St. Patrick Elementary School – Wentzville – (K-08) – Roman Catholic
- St. Paul Elementary School – St. Paul – (PK-08) – Roman Catholic
- St. Peter Catholic School – St. Charles – (PK-08) – Roman Catholic
- St. Theodore Catholic School – Wentzville – (K-08) – Roman Catholic
- Sts. Joachim & Ann School – St. Charles – (PK-08) – Roman Catholic
- Trinity Lutheran School – St. Charles – (01-08) – Lutheran
- Willott Road Christian Academy – St. Peters – (NS-09) – Baptist
- Zion Lutheran School – St. Charles – (PK-08) – Lutheran

=== Alternative schools ===
- Boonslick State School – St. Peters – Special Education
- Fort Zumwalt Hope High School – O'Fallon – Other/Alternative School – (09-12)
- Francis Howell Union High School – St. Charles – Other/Alternative School – (09-12)
- Heritage Landing – St. Peters – Other/Alternative School – (06-12)
- The Lead School – O'Fallon – Other/Alternative School – (K-12)
- Lewis & Clark Career Center – St. Charles – Vocational/Technical School – (09-12)
- Quest Day Treatment Center – St. Charles – Other/Alternative School – (06-12)
- Success Campus – St. Charles – Other/Alternative School – (09-12)

=== Higher education ===
- Lindenwood University – St. Charles
- St. Charles Community College – Cottleville

=== Public libraries ===
- St. Charles City-County Library District

== Government ==
St. Charles County is governed by a county executive and a county council. The county council consists of seven members, each elected from various districts in the county. The county executive is elected by the entire county. The current executive is Steve Ehlmann. He was preceded by Joe Ortwerth, who was preceded by Gene Schwendemann, the first county executive of St. Charles County under the new form of government. The executive under the old form of county government was termed a "judge." The county had 258,525 registered voters as of March 2016.

St. Charles County Ambulance District (SCCAD) is the largest such district in Missouri, serving all of St. Charles County and its population of nearly 370,000.

=== Law enforcement ===
The St. Charles County Sheriff's Department (SCCSD) is responsible for court services and security, prisoner transport, civil process, and bailiffs. Until the end of 2014, SCCSD was the primary law enforcement agency serving unincorporated areas of St. Charles County. On January 1, 2015, the St. Charles County Police Department was established and assumed that responsibility. It should not be confused with the St. Charles City Police Department. The St. Charles County Regional SWAT Team is made up of officers from each county law enforcement agency.

The SCCPD Aviation Unit is part of a multi-jurisdictional unit known as the Metro Air Support Unit, with the Metropolitan Police Department, City of St. Louis; St. Louis County Police Department; and St. Charles County Police Department. As of 2024, the fleet included five helicopters, and twelve pilots or pilots in training.

In May 2022, Ryan Keuhner, who was then an SCCSD deputy, shot and killed his neighbor's 3-year-old rescue dog with a pellet gun. The shooting was reportedly unprovoked and Keuhner was off duty at the time. Video of the dog's owner confronting Keuhner was uploaded online, and later gained national coverage. Keuhner resigned in June 2022 and was charged with a class A misdemeanor for animal abuse.

=== Library resolution ===
In 2023, the county council issued a resolution aimed at library policies and staff online activities. The resolution followed protests and comments at council meetings from residents who complained about a staff member wearing gender non-conforming clothes. Within the resolution, the council asked the library CEO to remove an article they shared on their personal LinkedIn profile related to conservative campaigns targeting public libraries and freedom of speech.

== Politics ==
=== Local ===
The Republican Party predominantly controls politics at the local level in St. Charles County. Republicans hold all the elected positions in the county.

Position	Incumbent	Party
Assessor	Travis Welge	Republican
Collector	Michelle McBride	Republican
Council Member – District 1	Matt Swanson	Republican
Council Member – District 2	Joseph Brazil	Republican
Council Member – District 3	Michael Elam	Republican
Council Member – District 4	David Hammond	Republican
Council Member – District 5	Terry Hollander	Republican
Council Member – District 6	Nancy Schneider	Republican
Council Member – District 7	Tim Baker	Republican
County Executive	Steve Ehlmann	Republican
Director of Elections	Kurt Bahr	Republican
Prosecuting Attorney	Joe McCulloch	Republican
Recorder	Mary Dempsey	Republican
Sheriff	Scott Lewis	Republican

=== State ===
Past Gubernatorial Elections Results
Year	Republican	Democratic	Third Parties
2024	59.51% 132,563	38.44% 85,628	2.05% 4,561
2020	58.12% 128,230	39.84% 87,888	2.04% 4,496
2016	54.52% 103,946	42.58% 85,704	2.90% 5,836
2012	48.58% 89,144	48.97% 89,860	2.45% 4,486
2008	44.51% 82,440	53.84% 99,705	1.65% 3,058
2004	55.90% 91,323	42.96% 70,184	1.14% 1,865
2000	58.24% 74,357	39.49% 50,415	2.27% 2,907
1996	49.48% 47,886	48.01% 46,462	2.50% 2,424

St. Charles County is divided among eleven legislative districts in the Missouri State House of Representatives, all of which are held by Republicans.

- District 63 – Tricia Byrnes (R-Wentzville, since 2023). Consists of most of Wentzville.
- District 64 – Deanna Self (R-St. Paul, since 2025). Consists of Flint Hill, Josephville, St. Paul, and parts of Foristell, O'Fallon, and Wentzville.
- District 65 – Wendy Hausman (R-St. Peters, since 2023). Consists of West Alton, Portage Des Sioux, and parts of Cottleville, St. Charles, and St. Peters.
- District 69 – Scott Miller (R-St. Charles, since 2025). Consists of parts of St. Peters and Weldon Spring.
- District 102 – Richard West (R-Wentzville, since 2021). Consists of Augusta, Defiance, New Melle, Weldon Springs Heights, and parts of Cottleville, O'Fallon, St. Peters, and Weldon Spring.
- District 103 – Dave Hinman (R-O'Fallon, since 2023). Consists of part of O'Fallon.
- District 104 – Terri Violet (R-St. Peters, since 2025). Consists of part of St. Charles and St. Peters.
- District 105 – Colin Wellenkamp (R-St. Charles, since 2025). Consists of part of St. Charles.
- District 106 – Travis Wilson (R-St. Charles, since 2023). Consists of part of St. Charles.
- District 107 – Mark Matthiesen (R-O'Fallon, since 2023). Consists of parts of Dardenne Prairie and O'Fallon.
- District 108 – Mike Costlow (R-Dardenne Prairie, since 2025). Consists of Lake St. Louis and parts of Dardenne Prairie and O'Fallon.

St. Charles County is divided into three districts in the Missouri State Senate, each of which are represented by Republicans.

- District 2 – Nick Schroer (R-Defiance, since 2023). Consists of the communities of Augusta, Cottleville, Dardenne Prairie, Defiance, Josephville, Lake St. Louis, New Melle, O'Fallon, St. Paul, Weldon Spring, and Weldon Spring Heights.
- District 10 - Travis Fitzwater (R-New Bloomfield, since 2023). Consists of the communities of Flint Hill, Foristell, and Wentzville.
- District 23 – Adam Schnelting (R-St. Charles, since 2025). Consists of Portage Des Sioux, St. Charles, St. Peters, and West Alton.

=== Federal ===
Missouri is represented in the U.S. Senate by Josh Hawley and Eric Schmitt, whose most recent election results from the county are included here.

U.S. Senate — Missouri — (2022)
Party	Candidate	Votes	%
Republican	Eric Schmitt	83,559	55.35%
Democratic	Trudy Busch Valentine	64,552	42.76%
Libertarian	Jonathan Dine	2,158	1.43%
Constitution	Paul Venable	709	0.47%
Total votes		150,978	100.00%

U.S. Senate — Missouri — (2018)
Party	Candidate	Votes	%
Republican	Josh Hawley	93,172	52.90%
Democratic	Claire McCaskill	77,973	44.30%
Independent	Craig O'Dear	2,393	1.40%
Libertarian	Japheth Campbell	1,836	1.0%
Green	Jo Crain	731	0.4%
Total votes		176,105	100%

U.S. Senate — Missouri — (2016)
Party	Candidate	Votes	%	±%
Republican	Roy Blunt	103,946	51.78%	+6.87
Democratic	Jason Kander	88,238	43.95%	−5.18
Libertarian	Jonathan Dine	5,238	2.61%	−3.35
Green	Johnathan McFarland	1,970	0.98%	+0.98
Constitution	Fred Ryman	1,355	0.67%	+0.67

U.S. Senate — Missouri — (2012)
Party	Candidate	Votes	%
Democratic	Claire McCaskill	89,993	49.10%
Republican	Todd Akin	82,278	44.90%
Libertarian	Jonathan Dine	10,924	6.0%

U.S. Senate — Missouri — (2010)
Party	Candidate	Votes	%
Republican	Roy Blunt	73,695	59.09%
Democratic	Robin Carnahan	43,955	35.24%
Libertarian	Jonathan Dine	10,924	6.0%

Part of St. Charles County is included in Missouri's 2nd Congressional District and is currently represented by Ann Wagner in the U.S. House of Representatives.

U.S. House of Representatives — Missouri's 2nd Congressional District — St. Charles County (2020)
Party	Candidate	Votes	%	±%
Republican	Ann Wagner	45,941	57.38%	
Democratic	Jill Schupp	31,239	39.02%	
Libertarian	Martin Schulte	2,821	3.52%	

U.S. House of Representatives — Missouri's 2nd Congressional District — St. Charles County (2018)
Party	Candidate	Votes	%	±%
Republican	Ann Wagner	37,875	57.5%	
Democratic	Cort VanOstran	26,782	40.6%	
Libertarian	Tony Kirk	956	1.5%	
Green	David Arnold	304	0.5%	
Independent	Ken Newhouse (write-in)	0	0.0%	
Total votes		65,917	100.0%	
Republican hold				

Most of St. Charles County is included in Missouri's 3rd Congressional District and is currently represented by Bob Onder (R-Lake St. Louis) in the U.S. House of Representatives.

U.S. House of Representatives — Missouri's 3rd Congressional District — St. Charles County (2020)
Party	Candidate	Votes	%	±%
Republican	Blaine Luetkemeyer	84,071	61.74%	
Democratic	Megan Rezabek	49,315	36.22%	
Libertarian	Leonard J Steinman II	2,631	1.93%	

U.S. House of Representatives — Missouri's 3rd Congressional District — St. Charles County (2018)
Party	Candidate	Votes	%	±%
Republican	Blaine Luetkemeyer	61,751	57.77%	
Democratic	Katy Geppert	43,070	40.30%	
Libertarian	Donald V. Stolle	2,062	1.93%	
Total votes		106,883	100.0%	
Republican hold				

United States presidential election results for St. Charles County, Missouri
Year	Republican		Democratic		Third party(ies)	
Year	No.	%	No.	%	No.	%
1888	2,668	52.65%	2,381	46.99%	18	0.36%
1892	2,522	50.00%	2,485	49.27%	37	0.73%
1896	3,173	56.15%	2,448	43.32%	30	0.53%
1900	3,324	58.10%	2,343	40.95%	54	0.94%
1904	3,203	62.91%	1,788	35.12%	100	1.96%
1908	3,480	62.84%	1,979	35.73%	79	1.43%
1912	2,350	49.00%	1,792	37.36%	654	13.64%
1916	3,518	64.16%	1,914	34.91%	51	0.93%
1920	6,645	72.13%	2,472	26.83%	96	1.04%
1924	4,668	59.11%	2,364	29.94%	865	10.95%
1928	5,404	51.43%	5,081	48.36%	22	0.21%
1932	3,664	34.12%	6,911	64.37%	162	1.51%
1936	5,156	42.72%	5,903	48.91%	1,009	8.36%
1940	7,792	59.14%	5,334	40.48%	50	0.38%
1944	7,050	58.92%	4,880	40.78%	36	0.30%
1948	5,976	49.54%	6,049	50.14%	39	0.32%
1952	8,451	56.48%	6,493	43.39%	20	0.13%
1956	9,462	55.40%	7,618	44.60%	0	0.00%
1960	10,888	47.80%	11,890	52.20%	0	0.00%
1964	9,020	38.30%	14,530	61.70%	0	0.00%
1968	13,533	45.63%	10,374	34.98%	5,752	19.39%
1972	25,677	69.94%	11,034	30.06%	0	0.00%
1976	26,105	53.60%	22,063	45.30%	536	1.10%
1980	36,050	60.32%	20,668	34.58%	3,050	5.10%
1984	47,784	73.06%	17,617	26.94%	0	0.00%
1988	50,005	62.90%	29,286	36.84%	209	0.26%
1992	38,673	36.29%	37,263	34.97%	30,627	28.74%
1996	47,705	46.66%	41,369	40.46%	13,172	12.88%
2000	72,114	56.04%	53,806	41.81%	2,766	2.15%
2004	95,826	58.61%	66,855	40.89%	807	0.49%
2008	102,550	54.27%	84,183	44.55%	2,224	1.18%
2012	110,784	59.44%	71,838	38.55%	3,744	2.01%
2016	121,650	59.87%	68,626	33.78%	12,908	6.35%
2020	128,389	57.83%	89,530	40.33%	4,098	1.85%
2024	130,588	57.74%	92,226	40.78%	3,352	1.48%

=== Federal politics ===
St. Charles County has long been a Republican stronghold despite being an urban county, likely due to it being the wealthiest county in Missouri.

Despite this, it did vote for Medicaid expansion in 2020, legal recreational marijuana in 2022, and legal abortion in 2024. It was also one of the few counties in Missouri to shift towards the Democrats from 2020 to 2024.

==== 2016 Missouri presidential primary results ====
Republican

Donald Trump won the most votes in St. Charles County, with 41.50 percent. U.S. Senator Ted Cruz (R-Texas) came in second with 38.87 percent, Governor John Kasich (R-Ohio) placed third with 10.70 percent, and U.S. Senator Marco Rubio (R-Florida) was fourth with 7.10 percent.

Democratic

U.S. Senator Bernie Sanders (I-Vermont) won the primary with 54.32 percent to former Secretary of State Hillary Clinton's 44.80 percent.

==== 2012 Missouri presidential primary results ====
Republican

Former U.S. Senator Rick Santorum (R-Pennsylvania) won the most votes in St. Charles County, with 56.29 percent. Former Governor Mitt Romney (R-Massachusetts) came in second with 25.43 percent, and former U.S. Representative Ron Paul (R-Texas) was third with 12.69 percent.

Democratic

With incumbent President Barack Obama facing no serious opposition, few St. Charles County voters voted in the Democratic primary; Obama won 87.83 percent.

==== 2008 Missouri presidential primary results ====
Republican

Former Governor Mitt Romney (R-Massachusetts) won the most votes in St. Charles County, with 37.72 percent. U.S. Senator John McCain (R-Arizona) came in second with 34.95 percent, former Governor Mike Huckabee (R-Arkansas) placed third with 21.83 percent, and U.S. Representative Ron Paul (R-Texas) was fourth with 3.83 percent.

Democratic

Former U.S. Senator Hillary Clinton (D-New York) received a total of 23,611 votes, more than any candidate from either party in St. Charles County during the 2008 presidential primary.

== Communities ==
=== Cities ===
- Augusta
- Cottleville
- Dardenne Prairie
- Flint Hill
- Foristell
- Lake St. Louis
- New Melle
- O'Fallon
- Portage Des Sioux
- St. Charles (county seat)
- St. Paul
- St. Peters
- Weldon Spring
- Wentzville
- West Alton

=== Villages ===
- Josephville
- Weldon Spring Heights

=== Census-designated place ===
- Defiance

=== Other unincorporated places ===
- Black Walnut
- Blase
- Boschertown
- Cappeln
- Elm Point
- Enon
- Femme Osage
- Gilmore
- Harvester
- Howell
- Kampville
- Klondike
- Marais Croche
- Matson
- Mechanicsville
- Nona
- Orchard Farm
- Pauldingville
- Peruque
- Schluersburg
- Toonerville
- Whitecorn

=== Islands ===
- Apple Island
- Dresser Island
- Ellis Island
- Howell Island
- Two Branch Island

== Subregions ==
=== Westplex ===
Westplex is an area within St. Charles County in east-central Missouri to the west of St. Louis County.

The Westplex is part of St. Charles County that used to be called "The Golden Triangle". The "triangle" was formed by I-70 to the north, Missouri Route 94 to the southeast, and I-64 to the southwest. Since almost all of the growth in St. Charles County was within this triangle it was dubbed the "Golden" area of St. Charles County, hence, Golden Triangle. Today the Westplex is made up of St. Charles, St. Peters, Weldon Spring, Cottleville, Dardenne Prairie, O'Fallon, Lake St. Louis, and Wentzville.

== See also ==
- List of counties in Missouri
- National Register of Historic Places listings in St. Charles County, Missouri
