= Justin Dirden =

American baseball player (born 1997)

- Outfielder
- Born: July 16, 1997 (age 27); O'Fallon, Missouri, U.S.
- Bats: Left Throws: Right

Justin Lee Dirden (born July 16, 1997) is an American former professional baseball outfielder.

== Career ==
=== Amateur ===
Dirden attended Fort Zumwalt North High School in O'Fallon, Missouri, where he played baseball and led the team with a .391 batting average as a junior in 2014. Following his graduation in 2015, he enrolled at East Carolina University where he played three games as a freshman in 2016 before transferring to Jefferson College where he played one season. Dirden then transferred to Southeast Missouri State University where he batted .340 with 16 home runs and 68 RBI over 56 starts for the 2018 season. He did not play in 2019 due to injury, and batted .414 with nine home runs over 17 games in 2020 before the college baseball season was cancelled due to the COVID-19 pandemic.

=== Houston Astros ===
Dirden went unselected in the shortened 2020 Major League Baseball draft and signed with the Houston Astros as an undrafted free agent. Dirden did not play in a game in 2020 due to the cancellation of the minor league season because of the COVID-19 pandemic.

Dirden split his first professional season in 2021 between the Fayetteville Woodpeckers and Asheville Tourists, batting .274/.397/.537 with 15 home runs and 58 RBI over 83 games. He opened the 2022 season with the Corpus Christi Hooks and was promoted to the Sugar Land Space Cowboys in early August. Over 124 games played between both teams, he slashed .302/.384/.558 with 40 doubles (tied with Matt Mervis for the minor league lead), 24 home runs, 101 RBI, and 12 stolen bases. To open the 2023 season, he returned to Sugar Land. He missed time during the season due to a hamstring injury. Over 84 games, Dirden batted .231 with ten home runs and 42 RBI. He was released by the Astros organization on April 5, 2024.

=== Milwaukee Brewers ===
On April 16, 2024, Dirden signed a minor league contract with the Milwaukee Brewers. In 24 games for the Double–A Biloxi Shuckers, he batted .177/.239/.241 with four RBI and three stolen bases. On May 20, Dirden retired from professional baseball.
