= Dardenne Prairie, Missouri =

- Town
- Seal

- Location in the state of Missouri
- Coordinates: 38°45′15″N 90°43′50″W
- Country: United States
- State: Missouri
- County: St. Charles
- Incorporated: 1983 (town), 2001 (city)

Area
  - Total: 5.32 sq mi (13.78 km^{2})
  - Land: 5.32 sq mi (13.77 km^{2})
  - Water: 0 sq mi (0.00 km^{2}) 0%
- Elevation: 584 ft (178 m)

Population (2020)
  - Total: 12,743
  - Density: 2,396.3/sq mi (925.21/km^{2})
- Time zone: UTC-6 (CST)
  - Summer (DST): UTC-5 (CDT)
- Postal code: 63368
- Area code: 636
- FIPS code: 29-18253
- GNIS feature ID: 2393718
- Website: www.dardenneprairie.gov

Dardenne Prairie is a city in St. Charles County, Missouri, United States. The population was 12,743 at the 2020 census.

== Geography ==
Dardenne Prairie is located southwest of O'Fallon on Missouri Route N, just east of I-64. According to the United States Census Bureau, the city has a total area of 4.92 square miles (12.74 km^{2}), all land.

== History ==
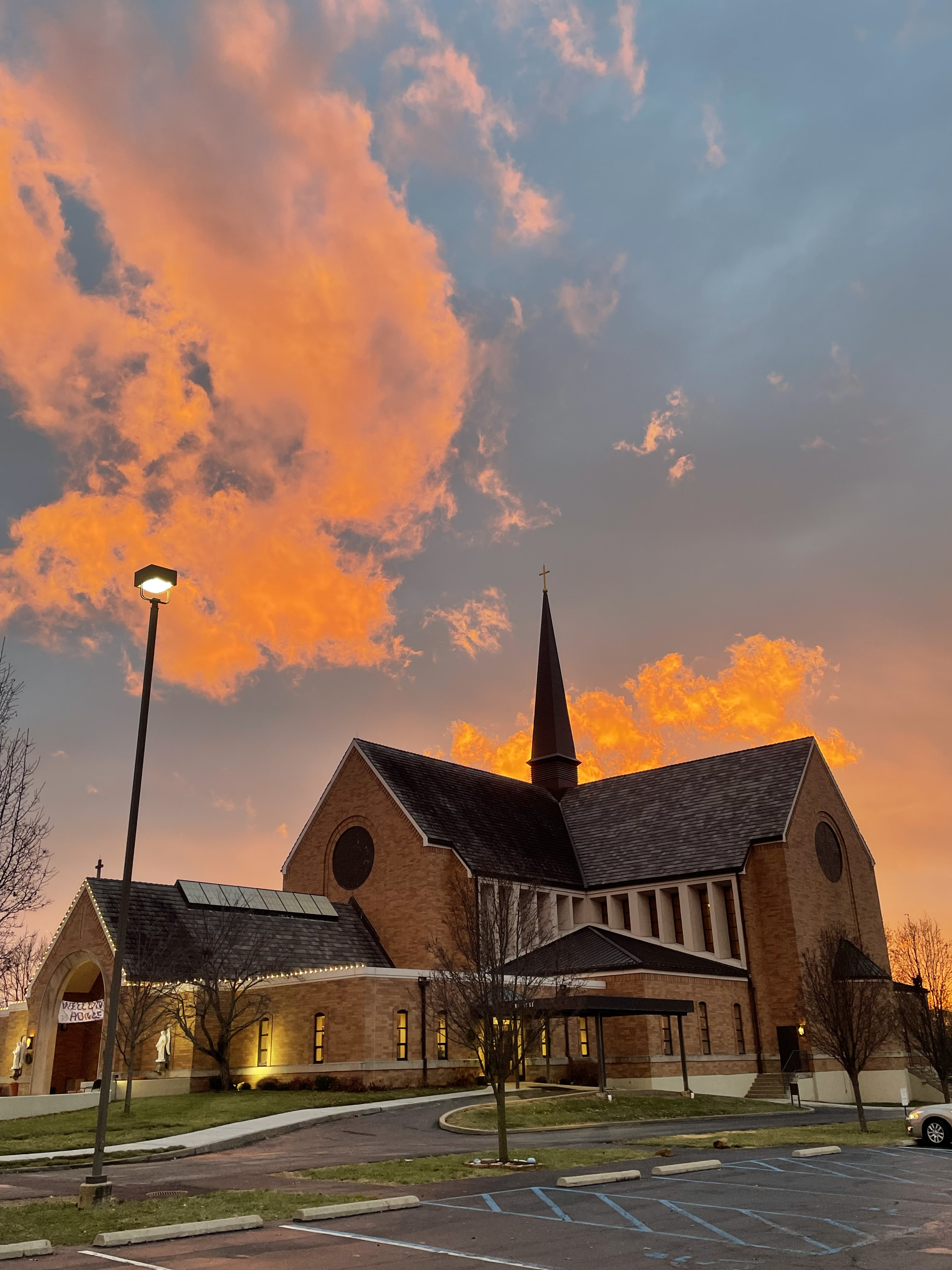
Immaculate Conception Church

Dardenne Prairie was originally a prairie region which began in the area near St. Peters and extended north of Dardenne Creek, almost to Peruque Creek. The area was named after the stream. In early documents the name appeared as Dardonne Creek, Darden Creek, Dardenne River, or Dardonne River. In Houck's history of 1908, Dardene River is also found.

Dardenne is said to be a corruption of the French Terre d'Inde, meaning the land of turkeys. However, Terre d'Inde actually translates to Land of India, while Turkey Land in French is Terre des Dindons, so that explanation may not be plausible. A different explanation is that the name was borrowed from the Dardenne family, who were early pioneers in the Mississippi Valley, and may have camped and hunted on the creek. However, there is no evidence that anyone by the name of Dardenne has ever owned land in St. Charles County, either under Spanish dominion or since the transfer. A third explanation posits that a French trapper could have named the creek Dardenne (or d'Ardenne in French) in memory of the similarly heavily-wooded Ardennes on the river Meuse in French Flanders.

In the meticulous journal that William Clark kept on his trip west to establish Fort Osage in 1808 (only two years after returning from the Lewis and Clark Expedition), he describes the prairie land around the Dardenne Creek area:

August 25th "Set out from St. Charles, at half past 11 o'clock a.m., and proceeded on, passed Several branches of the Dardan Creek a branch of the Mississippi, through a Butifull high rolling Country interspersed with plains of high grass Most of them rich & fertile, and encamped at a pond at the out Skirts of the Settlement in a butifull Plain, near a few low trees. had a Camp guard of 1st. 2d & 16 privates. Many of the Citizens visit us this evening. 21 miles".

== Demographics ==
Historical population
Census	Pop.	Note	%±
1990	1,769		—
2000	4,384		147.8%
2010	11,494		162.2%
2020	12,743		10.9%
2024 (est.)	14,407		13.1%
U.S. Decennial Census

=== 2020 census ===
As of the 2020 census, Dardenne Prairie had a population of 12,743. The median age was 42.3 years. 26.0% of residents were under the age of 18 and 16.1% of residents were 65 years of age or older. For every 100 females there were 95.3 males, and for every 100 females age 18 and over there were 93.6 males age 18 and over.

100.0% of residents lived in urban areas, while 0.0% lived in rural areas.

There were 4,363 households in Dardenne Prairie, of which 40.2% had children under the age of 18 living in them. Of all households, 72.6% were married-couple households, 7.7% were households with a male householder and no spouse or partner present, and 16.4% were households with a female householder and no spouse or partner present. About 15.5% of all households were made up of individuals and 9.7% had someone living alone who was 65 years of age or older.

There were 4,449 housing units, of which 1.9% were vacant. The homeowner vacancy rate was 0.8% and the rental vacancy rate was 2.0%.

Racial composition as of the 2020 census
Race	Number	Percent
White	10,946	85.9%
Black or African American	471	3.7%
American Indian and Alaska Native	8	0.1%
Asian	569	4.5%
Native Hawaiian and Other Pacific Islander	0	0.0%
Some other race	88	0.7%
Two or more races	661	5.2%
Hispanic or Latino (of any race)	369	2.9%

=== Demographic estimates ===
The 2020 United States census profile at data.census.gov reported 3,941 families and a population density of 2,395.3 per square mile (925.4/km^{2}).

The profile reported an average household size of 2.9 and an average family size of 3.2.

Age-distribution data showed that 6.7% of residents were from 18 to 24, 20.8% were from 25 to 44, and 35.7% were from 45 to 64.

=== Income and poverty ===
The 2016–2020 5-year American Community Survey estimates show that the median household income was $134,267 (with a margin of error of +/- $13,395) and the median family income was $146,274 (+/- $10,648). Males had a median income of $78,478 (+/- $5,911) versus $39,384 (+/- $6,299) for females. The median income for those above 16 years old was $58,750 (+/- $7,227). Approximately, 1.6% of families and 1.8% of the population were below the poverty line, including 1.1% of those under the age of 18 and 4.0% of those ages 65 or over.

=== 2010 census ===
As of the census of 2010, there were 11,494 people, 3,670 households, and 3,208 families living in the city. The population density was 2,336.2 inhabitants per square mile (902.0/km^{2}). There were 3,768 housing units at an average density of 765.9 per square mile (295.7/km^{2}). The racial makeup of the city was 90.7% White, 3.5% African American, 0.1% Native American, 3.5% Asian, 0.5% from other races, and 1.6% from two or more races. Hispanic or Latino of any race were 2.0% of the population.

There were 3,670 households, of which 51.7% had children under the age of 18 living with them, 79.0% were married couples living together, 5.7% had a female householder with no husband present, 2.7% had a male householder with no wife present, and 12.6% were non-families. 10.8% of all households were made up of individuals, and 4.5% had someone living alone who was 65 years of age or older. The average household size was 3.13 and the average family size was 3.38.

The median age in the city was 38 years. 33.3% of residents were under the age of 18; 5% were between the ages of 18 and 24; 25.8% were from 25 to 44; 26.2% were from 45 to 64; and 9.6% were 65 years of age or older. The gender makeup of the city was 49.0% male and 51.0% female.

=== 2000 census ===
As of the census of 2000, there were 4,384 people, 1,431 households, and 1,273 families living in the city. The population density was 1,004.3 inhabitants per square mile (387.8/km^{2}). There were 1,516 housing units at an average density of 347.3 per square mile (134.1/km^{2}). The racial makeup of the town was 96.42% White, 1.67% African American, 0.11% Native American, 0.96% Asian, 0.07% Pacific Islander, 0.36% from other races, and 0.41% from two or more races. Hispanic or Latino of any race were 0.96% of the population.

There were 1,431 households, out of which 48.8% had children under the age of 18 living with them, 84.3% were married couples living together, 3.3% had a female householder with no husband present, and 11.0% were non-families. 8.5% of all households were made up of individuals, and 2.1% had someone living alone who was 65 years of age or older. The average household size was 3.05 and the average family size was 3.25.

In the city the population was spread out, with 32.3% under the age of 18, 3.9% from 18 to 24, 37.1% from 25 to 44, 19.7% from 45 to 64, and 7.0% who were 65 years of age or older. The median age was 34 years. For every 100 females there were 99.5 males. For every 100 females age 18 and over, there were 97.3 males.

The median income for a household in the city was $77,086, and the median income for a family was $80,486. Males had a median income of $56,780 versus $30,037 for females. The per capita income for the city was $29,325. None of the families and 0.7% of the population were living below the poverty line, including no one under the age of 18 and 3.0% of those over 64.

== Education ==
Dardenne Prairie spans the Fort Zumwalt, Wentzville, and Francis Howell School Districts.

Schools in the Dardenne Prairie city limits include:

- The Wentzville district operates Barfield Early Childhood Center and Prairie View Elementary School in Dardenne Prairie. Crossroads Elementary School has a Dardenne Prairie post office address, but is in adjacent O'Fallon.
- The Fort Zumwalt School District operates Ostmann Elementary School in Dardenne Prairie. The district's Twin Chimneys Elementary School is in adjacent O'Fallon.
- The Francis Howell School District operates John Weldon Elementary School in Dardenne Prairie.

Additionally, St. Charles Community College's Dardenne Creek Campus, opened in 2017, is located in Dardenne Prairie. Originally focusing in nursing and other allied health programs, a secondary building was opened in 2019, the Field to Table Institute, which specializes in culinary arts and agriculture as well as healthcare.

== Notable person ==
- Joseph Woll (born 1998), NHL ice hockey goalie for the Toronto Maple Leafs
