= Ted Vincent =

American football player (born 1956)

No. 78, 66, 75
- Position: Defensive tackle

Personal information
- Born: August 10, 1956 (age 70); O'Fallon, Missouri, U.S.
- Listed height: 6 ft 4 in (1.93 m)
- Listed weight: 262 lb (119 kg)

Career information
- High school: Fort Zumwalt North (O'Fallon)
- College: Wichita State (1974–1977)
- NFL draft: 1978: 3rd round, 72nd overall pick

Career history
- Cincinnati Bengals (1978); San Francisco 49ers (1979–1980); Tampa Bay Buccaneers (1981)*; Chicago Bears (1982)*; New Jersey Generals (1983)*; Oklahoma Outlaws (1984)*; Jacksonville Bulls (1984)*; Orlando Renegades (1985)*
- * Offseason or practice squad member only

Career NFL statistics
- Sacks: 9
- Stats at Pro Football Reference

Theodore Michael Vincent (born August 10, 1956) is an American former professional football player who was a defensive tackle for three seasons in the National Football League (NFL) with the Cincinnati Bengals and San Francisco 49ers. He was selected by the Bengals in the third round of the 1978 NFL draft after playing college football for the Wichita State Shockers.

== Early life and college ==
Theodore Michael Vincent was born on August 10, 1956, in O'Fallon, Missouri. He attended Fort Zumwalt North High School in O'Fallon.

Vincent was a member of the Wichita State Shockers of Wichita State University from 1974 to 1977.

== Professional career ==
Vincent was selected by the Cincinnati Bengals in the third round, with the 72nd overall pick, of the 1978 NFL draft. He officially signed with the team on June 15. He played in all 16 games for the Bengals during his rookie year in 1978. Vincent was waived on August 29, 1979.

Vincent was claimed off waivers by the San Francisco 49ers on August 31, 1979. He appeared in all 16 games for the second consecutive season, starting 15, during the 1979 season and posted six sacks. He played in 12 games, starting ten, in 1980 and recorded three sacks.

In May 1981, Vincent was traded to the Tampa Bay Buccaneers for a 1982 tenth round draft pick. He was released on August 24, 1981.

Vincent signed with the Chicago Bears on April 30, 1982. He was released on September 6, 1982.

Vincent was signed by the New Jersey Generals of the United States Football League (USFL) on November 16, 1982. He was released on February 7, 1983.

He signed with the Oklahoma Outlaws of the USFL on October 12, 1983. However, he was later released.

Vincent signed with the USFL's Jacksonville Bulls for the 1984 season. On February 21, 1984, it was reported he had been released.

Vincent signed with the Orlando Renegades of the USFL in 1985 but was released.
