= St. Mary's Institute of O'Fallon =

- U.S. National Register of Historic Places
- U.S. Historic district
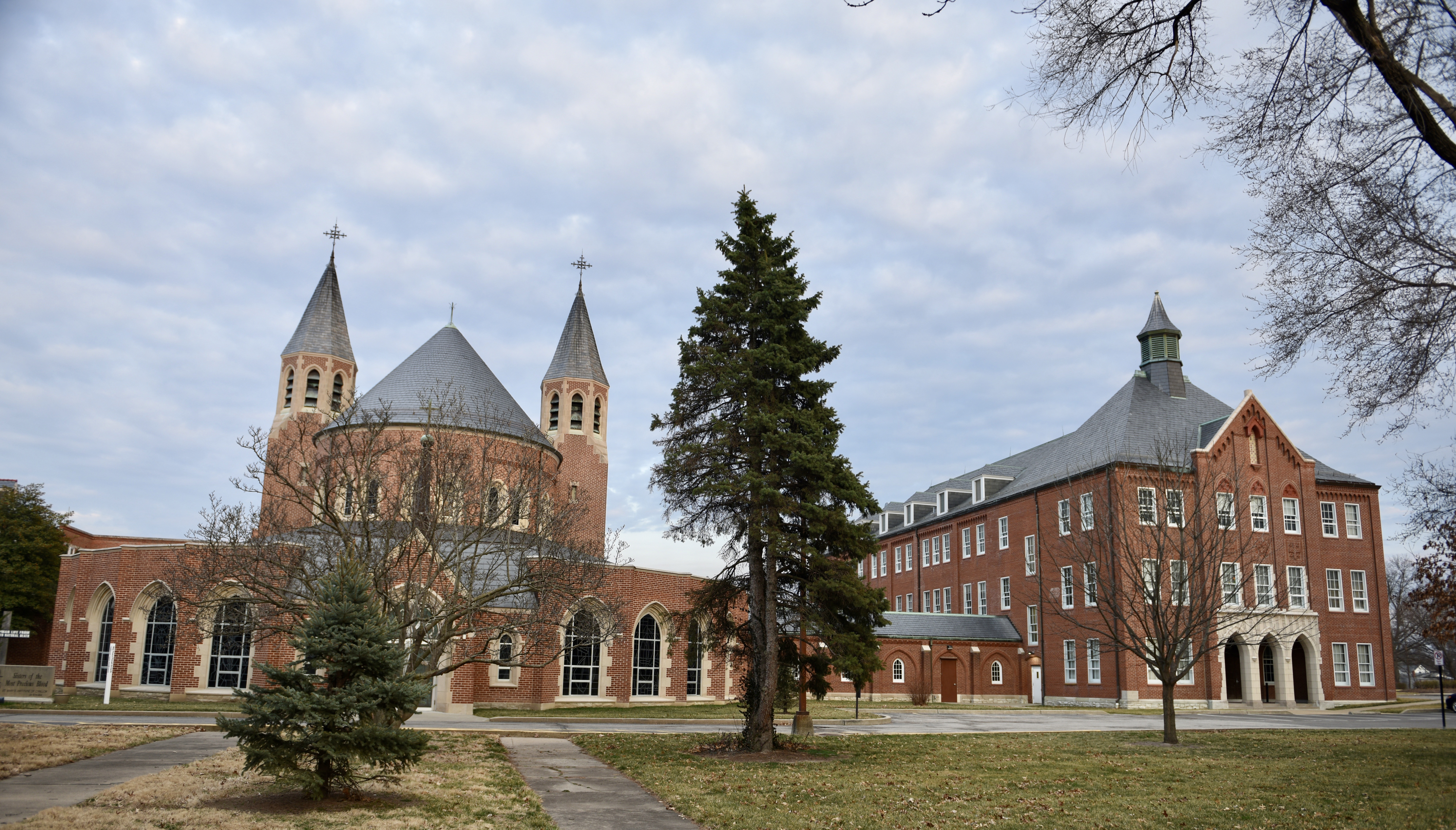

- Location within Missouri Location within the United States
- Location: 204 N. Main St., O'Fallon, Missouri
- Coordinates: 38°48′44″N 90°41′54″W
- Area: 42.6 acres (17.2 ha)
- Built: 1874
- Architect: Kister, Henry
- Architectural style: Gothic, Colonial Revival
- NRHP reference No.: 07001106
- Added to NRHP: October 26, 2007

St. Mary's Institute of O'Fallon, also known as the Motherhouse for the Congregation of the Sisters of the Adoration of the Most Precious Blood, is a historic convent, school, and national historic district located at O'Fallon, St. Charles County, Missouri. The district encompasses 11 contributing buildings and 1 contributing site (a cemetery). The main building is the three-story, Gothic Revival style motherhouse. Its original section was built in 1874, with a series of interconnected wings dating from 1874 through 1997 making for a complex, irregular plan building. The building includes the convent, two chapels, academy, novitiate, dining room, kitchen, gym, and infirmary. A part of the building houses the O'Fallon City Hall.

It was added to the National Register of Historic Places in 2007.
