= Dominick Puni =

American football player (born 2000)

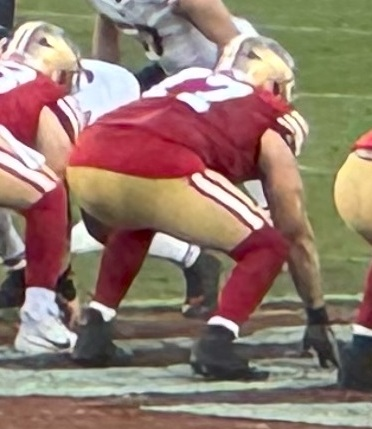
- Puni with the San Francisco 49ers in 2024

No. 77 – San Francisco 49ers
- Position: Guard
- Roster status: Active

Personal information
- Born: February 24, 2000 (age 26); St. Charles, Missouri, U.S.
- Listed height: 6 ft 5 in (1.96 m)
- Listed weight: 313 lb (142 kg)

Career information
- High school: Francis Howell Central (Cottleville, Missouri)
- College: Central Missouri (2018–2021); Kansas (2022–2023)
- NFL draft: 2024: 3rd round, 86th overall pick

Career history
- San Francisco 49ers (2024–present)

Awards and highlights
- PFWA All-Rookie Team (2024); First-team All-Big 12 (2023)

Career NFL statistics as of Week 1, 2026
- Games played: 35
- Games started: 35
- Stats at Pro Football Reference

Dominick Puni (POU-nee; born February 24, 2000) is an American professional football guard for the San Francisco 49ers of the National Football League (NFL). He played college football for the Central Missouri Mules and Kansas Jayhawks.

== Early life ==
Puni was born on February 24, 2000, in St. Charles, Missouri. He attended Francis Howell Central High School in Cottleville, Missouri.

== College career ==
Puni played college football at the University of Central Missouri from 2018 to 2021. He did not play in 2020 due to the team's season being cancelled because of the COVID-19 pandemic, and played in only one game in 2021 due to injury. Puni transferred to the University of Kansas in 2022. He started all 24 games he played in during his two years at Kansas. He opted out of the 2023 Guaranteed Rate Bowl in order to prepare for the 2024 NFL draft.

== Professional career ==
Pre-draft measurables
Height	Weight	Arm length	Hand span	Wingspan	40-yard dash	10-yard split	20-yard split	20-yard shuttle	Three-cone drill	Vertical jump	Broad jump	Bench press
6 ft 5 1/8 in (1.96 m)	313 lb (142 kg)	33 3/8 in (0.85 m)	10 1/8 in (0.26 m)	6 ft 9 1/8 in (2.06 m)	5.35 s	1.86 s	3.13 s	4.40 s	7.47 s	30.0 in (0.76 m)	8 ft 11 in (2.72 m)	26 reps
All values from NFL Combine/Pro Day

Puni was drafted by the San Francisco 49ers in the third round with the 86th overall pick in the 2024 NFL draft. On August 23, he was named the starting right guard for the beginning of the 2024 NFL season. As a rookie, Puni started in all 17 games in the 2024 season. He was named to the PFWA All-Rookie Team.

== Personal life ==
Puni hails from a family of athletes. His parents, Teu and Jessica, were both college athletes at Truman State University. His father was a football player, and his mother played volleyball. His brothers, Derrick and Devin, were also football players, attending Central Missouri, one of the schools Dominic played college football at. His sister, Brianna, was also a college basketball player at Illinois State.

Puni is also the cousin of NFL defensive end A. J. Epenesa.

Puni is of Samoan ancestry, and was a finalist for the Polynesian College Football Player of the Year Award in 2023.
