= Harvester, Missouri =

Unincorporated community in Missouri, US

Coordinates: 38°44′45″N 90°34′50″W

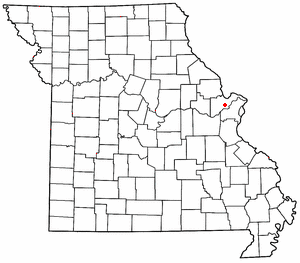

Harvester is an unincorporated community in St. Charles County, in the U.S. state of Missouri. Much of the community has been annexed by St. Peters.

== History ==
A post office called Harvester was established in 1881, and remained in operation until 1901. The community was so named on account of wheat fields near the original town site.
