= Pauldingville, Missouri =

Unincorporated community in Missouri, U.S.

Coordinates: 38°46′29″N 90°57′19″W

Pauldingville is an unincorporated community in northwest St. Charles County, in the U.S. state of Missouri. The community is three miles south of Foristell and I-70. Sams Creek flows past approximately one mile to the east.

The namesake of Pauldingville is unknown.
