= Francis Howell North High School =

Public school in Saint Charles, Missouri, United States

Coordinates: 38°45′43.96″N 90°33′34.02″W

Location
- 2549 Hackmann Road; Saint Peters, Missouri 63303; United States

Information
- Type: Public School
- Established: 1983; 43 years ago
- Principal: Jeffrey Fletcher
- Staff: 88.88 (FTE)
- Grades: 9–12
- Enrollment: 1,716 (2024–2025)
- Student to teacher ratio: 19.31
- Colors: Black and gold
- Mascot: Norm the Knight
- Nickname: Knights
- Newspaper: North Star
- Yearbook: Excalibur
- Website: fhn.fhsdschools.org

Francis Howell North High School (FHN) is a four-year public secondary school located in St. Peters, Missouri, with a St. Charles postal address. The mascot of the school is Norm the Knight.

== History ==
After Francis Howell High School alone could no longer support the increasing population of its part of St. Charles County in 1983, Henderson Junior High School was built on Hackmann Road on the border of the cities of St. Charles and St. Peters. Henderson was eventually expanded and the name was changed to Francis Howell North High School and began taking high school students in 1986. A third high school (Francis Howell Central) was built in 1997.

The school is named after the early settler and militia leader Col. Francis Howell, who moved to St. Charles in 1797. His brother, Lewis Howell, was an advocate for education in the area.

== Athletics and activities ==
The Francis Howell North Knights are home to a few official athletic team State Championships, including: the 1991 wrestling team, 1995 Varsity girls soccer team, and 3 State titles in hockey. The high school's newspaper, The North Star, has earned multiple national awards.

== Notable alumni ==
- Brandon Bollig – professional ice hockey player for the San Jose Sharks, Calgary Flames and the Chicago Blackhawks
- Mark Buehrle – professional baseball player for the Chicago White Sox, Miami Marlins, and the Toronto Blue Jays
- Hali Long – soccer player for the Philippines women's national football team
