= St. Charles City-County Library =

Public library system in east-central Missouri

- 38.7842°N 90.600°W
- Location: 77 Boone Hills Dr, St. Peters, Missouri
- Type: Public law library
- Established: August 1, 1973
- Branches: 11

Other information
- Budget: $21 million (FY 2023)
- Director: John Greifzu
- Website: www.stchlibrary.org

The St. Charles City-County Library is made up of eleven library branchs located throughout St. Charles County in east-central Missouri (United States). These libraries serve the residents of St. Charles County, and branches host nearly two million visitors per year.

The Library was established on August 1, 1973, when the Kathryn Linnemann Library of St. Charles merged with the St. Charles County Library District. It is governed by a board of trustees, and funded primarily through property taxes.

== Branches ==
Branch Name	Branch Location
Kathryn Linnemann	2323 Elm Street, St. Charles 63301
Middendorf-Kredell	2750 Highway K, O'Fallon 63368
Spencer Road	427 Spencer Road, St. Peters 63376
Corporate Parkway	1200 Corporate Parkway, Wentzville 63385
Deer Run	1300 North Main, O’Fallon 63366
Kisker Road	1000 Kisker Road, St. Charles 63304
McClay Branch	2760 McClay Road, St. Charles 63303
Cliff View Branch	10 Cliff View Drive, Wentzville 63385
WingHaven	7435 Village Center Drive, O’Fallon 63368
Augusta Branch	198 Jackson Street, Augusta 63332
Boone's Trail Branch	10 Fiddlecreek Ridge Road, Wentzville, 63385

In 2024, library administration proposed a plan to close three branches to pay for e-book lending and raise staff wages, which are below market rate. Following public outcry, the board voted unanimously against the plan.

== Collections ==
The St. Charles City-County Library circulates over 5.5 million items per year. Its branches loan books, music, magazines, movies, audiobooks, video games, and alternative materials. Some of the library's more unusual items for check-out include cake pans, fitness kits, kitchen equipment, talking books for children, book discussion kits, and telescopes. The library also offers electronic books, magazines, music, audiobooks and a wide variety of research resources that can be downloaded or streamed from an internet-connected device in a customer's home.

== Services ==
In addition to library materials, the St. Charles City-County Library provides events and classes for the community. Customers can attend book discussion groups, children's story times, teen events, crafting classes, author visits, technology training, themed events, game nights, concerts, and participate in a summer reading program for all ages. The combined eleven branches offer over 6,000 different events each year.

The St. Charles City-County Library also offers outreach services to those in the community that may not be able to access its branches. Library staff provide programming and library materials to nursing homes, retirement communities, schools, day care centers, the homebound, and the incarcerated.

Customers can access gathering places for community groups, business meetings, recreational groups, and informal gatherings. Most branches offer rooms for reserve and all branches have public computers and study spaces.

In 2022, the Library launched a bookmobile to extend services across the county. The original plan included three schools as service points, however they were cancelled due to uncertainties around Jay Ashcroft's newly implemented book ban law.
