= St. Paul, Missouri =

- City
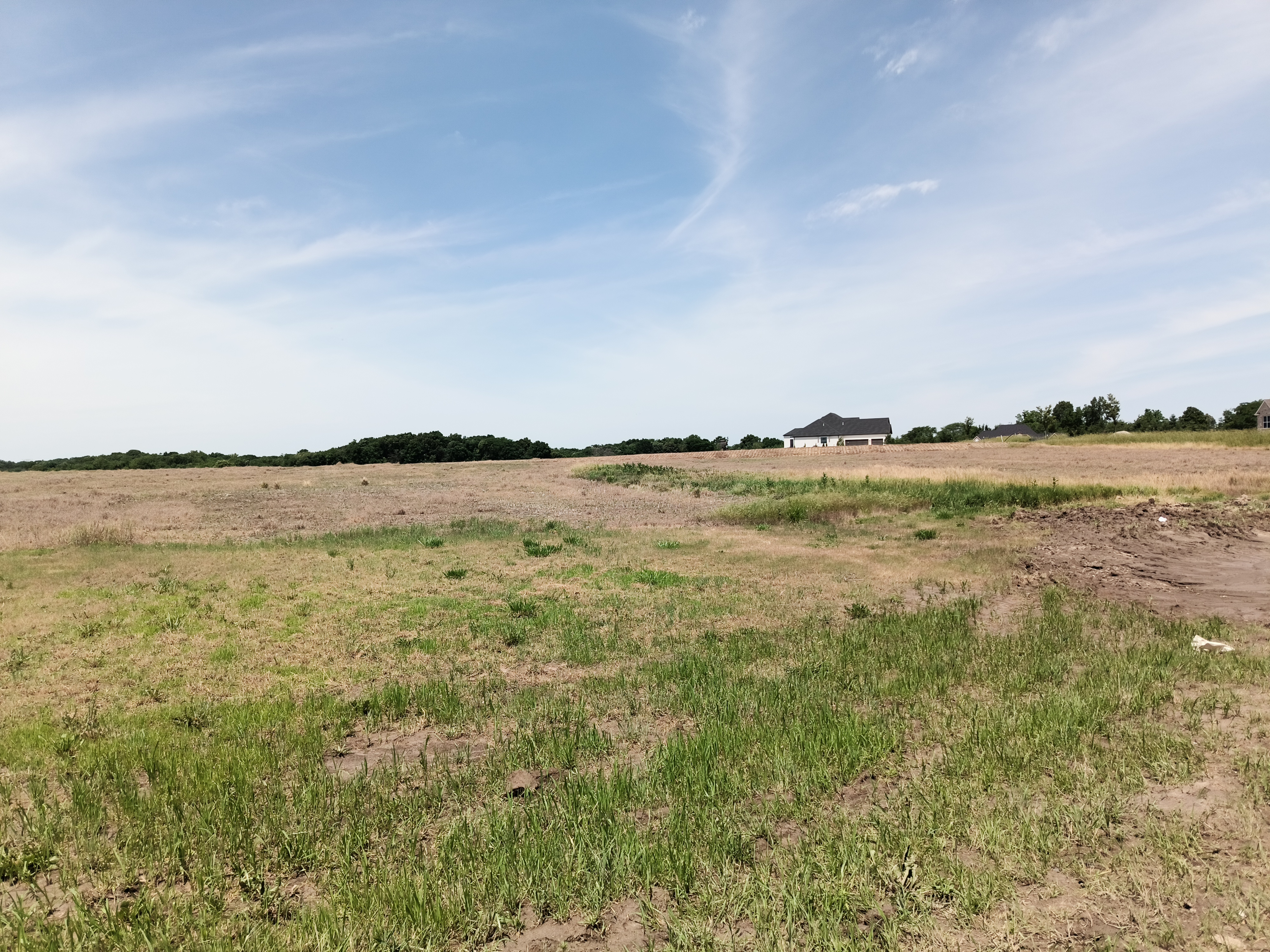
- St. Paul in 2026

- Location of Saint Paul, Missouri
- Coordinates: 38°51′20″N 90°44′32″W
- Country: United States
- State: Missouri
- County: St. Charles
- Named for: St. Paul the Apostle

Area
  - Total: 7.19 sq mi (18.62 km^{2})
  - Land: 7.19 sq mi (18.62 km^{2})
  - Water: 0 sq mi (0.00 km^{2})
- Elevation: 522 ft (159 m)

Population (2020)
  - Total: 3,005
  - Density: 418.1/sq mi (161.43/km^{2})
- Time zone: UTC-6 (Central (CST))
  - Summer (DST): UTC-5 (CDT)
- ZIP code: 63366
- Area code: 636
- FIPS code: 29-65108
- GNIS feature ID: 2396513
- Website: cityofstpaulmissouri.com

St. Paul is a city in St. Charles County, Missouri, United States. The population was 1,829 at the 2010 census.

== History ==
A post office called Saint Paul was established in 1875, and remained in operation until 1964. The community takes its name from a local Roman Catholic church of the same name.

== Geography ==
According to the United States Census Bureau, the city has a total area of 6.68 square miles (17.30 km^{2}), all land.

== Demographics ==
Historical population
| Census | Pop. | Note | %± |
|---|---|---|---|
| 1880 | 64 | | — |
| 1980 | 607 | | — |
| 1990 | 1,192 | | 96.4% |
| 2000 | 1,634 | | 37.1% |
| 2010 | 1,829 | | 11.9% |
| 2020 | 3,005 | | 64.3% |
U.S. Decennial Census

=== 2020 census ===
As of the 2020 census, St. Paul had a population of 3,005. The median age was 41.5 years. 23.1% of residents were under the age of 18 and 14.4% of residents were 65 years of age or older. For every 100 females there were 103.2 males, and for every 100 females age 18 and over there were 101.8 males age 18 and over.

2.4% of residents lived in urban areas, while 97.6% lived in rural areas.

There were 1,054 households in St. Paul, of which 35.2% had children under the age of 18 living in them. Of all households, 80.3% were married-couple households, 7.9% were households with a male householder and no spouse or partner present, and 8.2% were households with a female householder and no spouse or partner present. About 8.7% of all households were made up of individuals and 3.9% had someone living alone who was 65 years of age or older.

There were 1,080 housing units, of which 2.4% were vacant. The homeowner vacancy rate was 1.4% and the rental vacancy rate was 7.7%.

Racial composition as of the 2020 census
| Race | Number | Percent |
|---|---|---|
| White | 2,760 | 91.8% |
| Black or African American | 50 | 1.7% |
| American Indian and Alaska Native | 1 | 0.0% |
| Asian | 19 | 0.6% |
| Native Hawaiian and Other Pacific Islander | 1 | 0.0% |
| Some other race | 27 | 0.9% |
| Two or more races | 147 | 4.9% |
| Hispanic or Latino (of any race) | 53 | 1.8% |

=== 2010 census ===
As of the census of 2010, there were 1,829 people, 638 households, and 553 families living in the city. The population density was 273.8 inhabitants per square mile (105.7/km^{2}). There were 656 housing units at an average density of 98.2 per square mile (37.9/km^{2}). The racial makeup of the city was 98.7% White, 0.3% African American, 0.2% Native American, 0.1% Asian, 0.3% from other races, and 0.3% from two or more races. Hispanic or Latino of any race were 0.4% of the population.

There were 638 households, of which 34.5% had children under the age of 18 living with them, 81.2% were married couples living together, 3.0% had a female householder with no husband present, 2.5% had a male householder with no wife present, and 13.3% were non-families. 10.8% of all households were made up of individuals, and 5% had someone living alone who was 65 years of age or older. The average household size was 2.87 and the average family size was 3.10.

The median age in the city was 45.6 years. 22.6% of residents were under the age of 18; 9.2% were between the ages of 18 and 24; 16.8% were from 25 to 44; 38.7% were from 45 to 64; and 12.7% were 65 years of age or older. The gender makeup of the city was 51.1% male and 48.9% female.

=== 2000 census ===
As of the census of 2000, there were 1,634 people, 506 households, and 447 families living in the city. The population density was 243.1 inhabitants per square mile (93.9/km^{2}). There were 517 housing units at an average density of 76.9 per square mile (29.7/km^{2}). The racial makeup of the city was 98.96% White, 0.06% African American, 0.12% Native American, 0.18% from other races, and 0.67% from two or more races. Hispanic or Latino of any race were 1.29% of the population.

There were 506 households, out of which 49.6% had children under the age of 18 living with them, 82.8% were married couples living together, 3.6% had a female householder with no husband present, and 11.5% were non-families. 8.9% of all households were made up of individuals, and 4.9% had someone living alone who was 65 years of age or older. The average household size was 3.23 and the average family size was 3.45.

In the city the population was spread out, with 32.4% under the age of 18, 7.2% from 18 to 24, 28.9% from 25 to 44, 23.6% from 45 to 64, and 7.9% who were 65 years of age or older. The median age was 37 years. For every 100 females there were 101.0 males. For every 100 females age 18 and over, there were 95.7 males.

The median income for a household in the city was $67,841, and the median income for a family was $68,438. Males had a median income of $50,000 versus $27,768 for females. The per capita income for the city was $22,216. About 1.1% of families and 1.3% of the population were below the poverty line, including 0.5% of those under age 18 and 5.3% of those age 65 or over.

== Education ==
All of St. Paul is in the Fort Zumwalt R-II School District.
