= Josephville, Missouri =

- Village
- Location of Josephville, Missouri
- Coordinates: 38°49′52″N 90°47′58″W
- Country: United States
- State: Missouri
- County: St. Charles

Area
  - Total: 2.85 sq mi (7.38 km^{2})
  - Land: 2.85 sq mi (7.38 km^{2})
  - Water: 0 sq mi (0.00 km^{2})
- Elevation: 620 ft (189 m)

Population (2020)
  - Total: 512
  - Density: 179.7/sq mi (69.37/km^{2})
- Time zone: UTC-6 (Central (CST))
  - Summer (DST): UTC-5 (CDT)
- FIPS code: 29-37700
- GNIS feature ID: 0756234

Josephville is a village in St. Charles County, Missouri, United States. As of the 2020 census, Josephville had a population of 512. It is located about 35 miles west of St. Louis.

== History ==
A post office called Josephville opened in 1875, and remained in operation until 1910. The community was named for its first postmaster, Joseph Wilmes.

== Geography ==
According to the United States Census Bureau, the village has a total area of 2.38 square miles (6.16 km^{2}), all land.

== Demographics ==
Historical population
Census	Pop.	Note	%±
1980	58		—
1990	445		667.2%
2000	270		−39.3%
2010	376		39.3%
2020	512		36.2%
U.S. Decennial Census

=== 2010 census ===
As of the census of 2010, there were 376 people, 133 households, and 110 families living in the village. The population density was 158.0 inhabitants per square mile (61.0/km^{2}). There were 140 housing units at an average density of 58.8 per square mile (22.7/km^{2}). The racial makeup of the village was 96.5% White, 1.1% African American, 0.8% Native American, 0.3% Asian, 0.8% from other races, and 0.5% from two or more races. Hispanic or Latino of any race were 0.5% of the population.

There were 133 households, of which 32.3% had children under the age of 18 living with them, 70.7% were married couples living together, 7.5% had a female householder with no husband present, 4.5% had a male householder with no wife present, and 17.3% were non-families. 12.0% of all households were made up of individuals, and 5.3% had someone living alone who was 65 years of age or older. The average household size was 2.83 and the average family size was 3.12.

The median age in the village was 44.7 years. 23.7% of residents were under the age of 18; 8.1% were between the ages of 18 and 24; 18.6% were from 25 to 44; 37% were from 45 to 64; and 12.5% were 65 years of age or older. The gender makeup of the village was 49.2% male and 50.8% female.

=== 2000 census ===
As of the census of 2000, there were 270 people, 91 households, and 70 families living in the village. The population density was 172.3 inhabitants per square mile (66.5/km^{2}). There were 93 housing units at an average density of 59.4 per square mile (22.9/km^{2}). The racial makeup of the village was 99.63% White and 0.37% Asian. Hispanic or Latino of any race were 0.74% of the population.

There were 91 households, out of which 37.4% had children under the age of 18 living with them, 63.7% were married couples living together, 8.8% had a female householder with no husband present, and 22.0% were non-families. 19.8% of all households were made up of individuals, and 3.3% had someone living alone who was 65 years of age or older. The average household size was 2.96 and the average family size was 3.46.

In the village, the population was spread out, with 33.3% under the age of 18, 6.3% from 18 to 24, 28.1% from 25 to 44, 21.5% from 45 to 64, and 10.7% who were 65 years of age or older. The median age was 37 years. For every 100 females, there were 117.7 males. For every 100 females age 18 and over, there were 106.9 males.

The median income for a household in the village was $52,500, and the median income for a family was $54,643. Males had a median income of $36,042 versus $23,750 for females. The per capita income for the village was $16,363. About 4.5% of families and 1.8% of the population were below the poverty line, including 1.8% of those under the age of eighteen and none of those 65 or over.

== Education ==
The majority of Josephville is in the Fort Zumwalt R-II School District. A small piece in the Wentzville R-IV School District.
