= St. Peters, Missouri =

City in east central Missouri, U.S.

- City
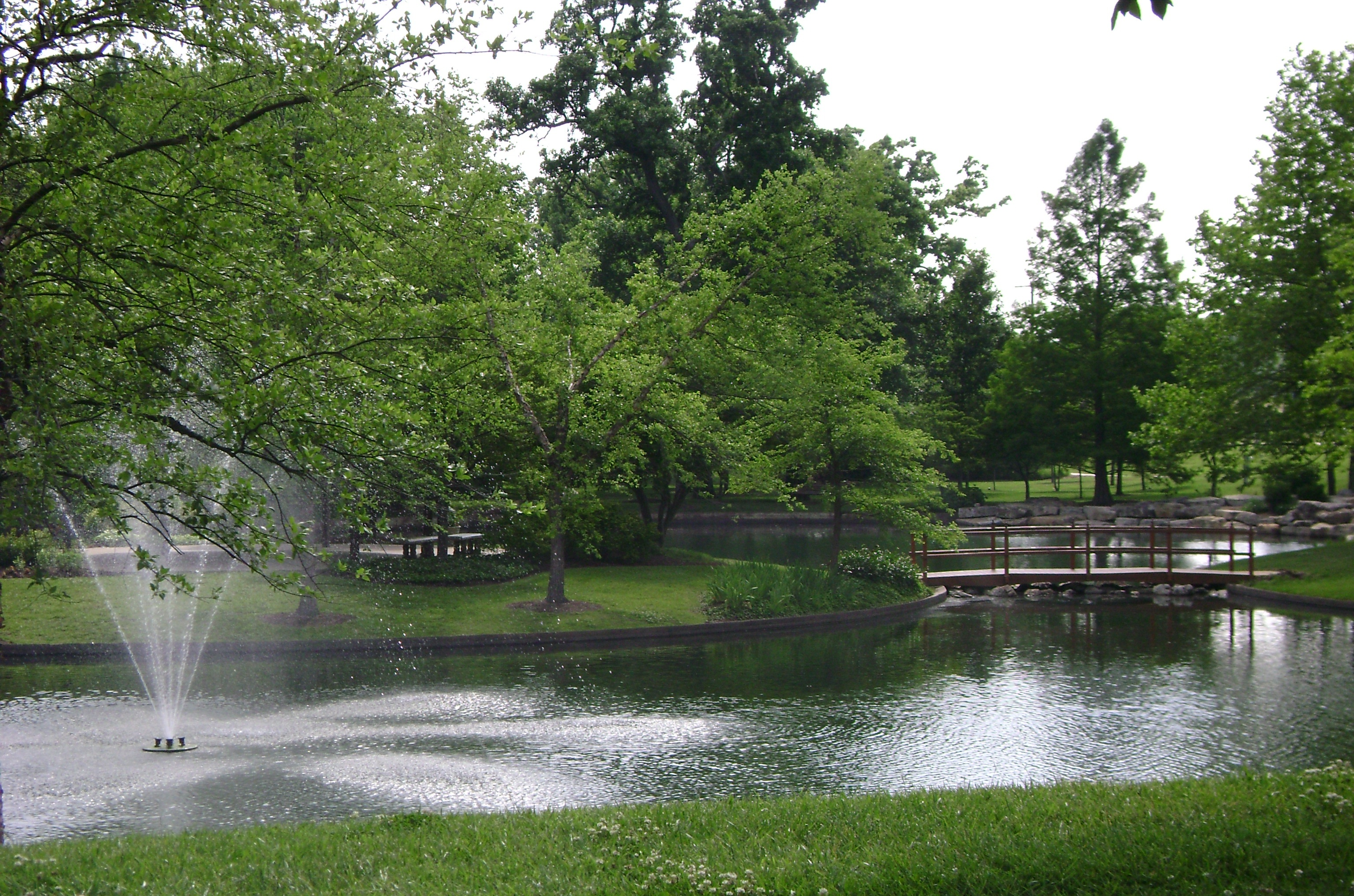
- City Centre Park near City Hall

- Seal

- Location of St. Peters in Missouri
- Coordinates: 38°46′44″N 90°36′11″W
- Country: United States
- State: Missouri
- County: St. Charles
- Incorporated: 1910

Government
  - Mayor: Len Pagano

Area
  - Total: 22.47 sq mi (58.19 km^{2})
  - Land: 22.46 sq mi (58.18 km^{2})
  - Water: 0.0039 sq mi (0.01 km^{2})

Population (2020)
  - Total: 57,732
  - Estimate (2024): 61,398
  - Density: 2,570/sq mi (992.3/km^{2})
- Time zone: UTC−6 (CST)
  - Summer (DST): UTC−5 (CDT)
- ZIP code: 63376, 63304, 63303, 63366
- Area code: 636
- FIPS code: 29-65126
- Website: stpetersmo.net

St. Peters is a city in St. Charles County, Missouri, United States. The population was 57,732 at the 2020 census, making it the eleventh-largest city in Missouri. It is a northwestern suburb of St. Louis.

Interstate 70 passes through the city, providing a major transportation link. The city hosts the county's largest shopping center, Mid Rivers Mall.

== History ==
Prior to the arrival of Europeans, the area that would become St. Peters was inhabited by Mississippian mound builders. The remains of a village were uncovered during the construction of I-70 in 1954 and a street near the site was later named Mound Drive after the mounds built by the villagers.

One of the first documented sources about European settlers in the area is a Spanish census from 1791, which documented a land grant. St. Peters was named for a Jesuit mission established there. In 1895, music was a binding factor for the area, with a well-known cornet band.

Throughout most of the twentieth century, St. Peters was a small farming town. As recently as 1970, St. Peters had a population of only 486. The population rapidly increased to 15,700 by 1980 and within the span of a decade the community changed from a small rural town to a more suburban community. The city continued its rapid growth through the 1980s and by 1990 had a population of 40,660. St. Peters population increased to an estimated 52,575 as of 2010. St.Peters celebrated its 50th year as a city in 2009, and marked its 100th year as a town in 2010, having become a town in 1910 and a city in 1959.

During flooding in the region, the National Weather Service reported 12.3 inches (310 mm) of rainfall in St. Peters for July 26, 2022, considered an unofficial record.

== Geography ==
According to the United States Census Bureau, the city has a total area of 22.37 square miles (57.94 km^{2}), all land.

=== Climate ===
Climate data for St. Peters, Missouri (1991–2020 normals, extremes 1893–present)
Month	Jan	Feb	Mar	Apr	May	Jun	Jul	Aug	Sep	Oct	Nov	Dec	Year
Record high °F (°C)	82 (28)	83 (28)	93 (34)	94 (34)	101 (38)	106 (41)	115 (46)	112 (44)	106 (41)	97 (36)	87 (31)	77 (25)	115 (46)
Mean maximum °F (°C)	64.4 (18.0)	69.9 (21.1)	78.1 (25.6)	84.6 (29.2)	89.1 (31.7)	93.0 (33.9)	96.1 (35.6)	96.3 (35.7)	91.6 (33.1)	86.4 (30.2)	74.9 (23.8)	66.7 (19.3)	97.9 (36.6)
Mean daily maximum °F (°C)	39.3 (4.1)	44.9 (7.2)	55.5 (13.1)	67.3 (19.6)	76.3 (24.6)	84.4 (29.1)	88.1 (31.2)	87.2 (30.7)	80.8 (27.1)	68.5 (20.3)	54.9 (12.7)	43.6 (6.4)	65.9 (18.8)
Daily mean °F (°C)	30.2 (−1.0)	34.8 (1.6)	44.4 (6.9)	55.3 (12.9)	64.9 (18.3)	73.9 (23.3)	77.8 (25.4)	76.3 (24.6)	68.9 (20.5)	56.9 (13.8)	44.9 (7.2)	35.0 (1.7)	55.3 (12.9)
Mean daily minimum °F (°C)	21.2 (−6.0)	24.8 (−4.0)	33.3 (0.7)	43.3 (6.3)	53.5 (11.9)	63.3 (17.4)	67.5 (19.7)	65.4 (18.6)	57.1 (13.9)	45.2 (7.3)	35.0 (1.7)	26.5 (−3.1)	44.7 (7.1)
Mean minimum °F (°C)	3.2 (−16.0)	8.4 (−13.1)	16.9 (−8.4)	30.0 (−1.1)	40.1 (4.5)	52.3 (11.3)	57.1 (13.9)	56.1 (13.4)	43.9 (6.6)	30.7 (−0.7)	20.1 (−6.6)	10.0 (−12.2)	0.2 (−17.7)
Record low °F (°C)	−25 (−32)	−24 (−31)	−7 (−22)	0 (−18)	30 (−1)	41 (5)	47 (8)	43 (6)	31 (−1)	19 (−7)	−4 (−20)	−19 (−28)	−25 (−32)
Average precipitation inches (mm)	2.44 (62)	2.37 (60)	3.46 (88)	4.74 (120)	4.80 (122)	4.26 (108)	4.23 (107)	3.76 (96)	3.07 (78)	3.11 (79)	3.54 (90)	2.56 (65)	42.34 (1,075)
Average snowfall inches (cm)	4.7 (12)	5.0 (13)	1.5 (3.8)	0.1 (0.25)	0.0 (0.0)	0.0 (0.0)	0.0 (0.0)	0.0 (0.0)	0.0 (0.0)	0.0 (0.0)	0.8 (2.0)	2.7 (6.9)	14.8 (38)
Average precipitation days (≥ 0.01 in)	7.6	8.4	11.0	11.2	12.7	10.1	8.8	8.2	8.1	7.7	8.8	8.6	111.2
Average snowy days (≥ 0.1 in)	2.8	3.3	1.3	0.1	0.0	0.0	0.0	0.0	0.0	0.0	0.4	2.3	10.2
Source: NOAA

== Demographics ==
Historical population
Census	Pop.	Note	%±
1880	334		—
1910	269		—
1920	358		33.1%
1930	248		−30.7%
1940	305		23.0%
1950	377		23.6%
1960	404		7.2%
1970	486		20.3%
1980	15,700		3,130.5%
1990	45,779		191.6%
2000	51,381		12.2%
2010	52,575		2.3%
2020	57,732		9.8%
U.S. Decennial Census

=== 2020 census ===
As of the 2020 census, St. Peters had a population of 57,732, 23,606 households, and 15,215 families. The population density was 2,570.4 inhabitants per square mile (992.4/km^{2}). There were 24,233 housing units, of which 2.6% were vacant; the homeowner vacancy rate was 0.6% and the rental vacancy rate was 4.7%.

The median age was 41.1 years. 20.7% of residents were under the age of 18, 7.4% were from 18 to 24, 26.7% were from 25 to 44, 27.0% were from 45 to 64, and 18.2% were 65 years of age or older. For every 100 females there were 92.8 males, and for every 100 females age 18 and over there were 89.6 males age 18 and over.

Of the 23,606 households, 28.0% had children under the age of 18 living in them. Of all households, 50.6% were married-couple households, 15.8% were households with a male householder and no spouse or partner present, and 27.4% were households with a female householder and no spouse or partner present. About 28.4% of all households were made up of individuals, and 12.1% had someone living alone who was 65 years of age or older. The average household size was 2.5 and the average family size was 3.1.

99.9% of residents lived in urban areas, while 0.1% lived in rural areas.

Racial composition as of the 2020 census
Race	Number	Percent
White	48,135	83.4%
Black or African American	3,243	5.6%
American Indian and Alaska Native	126	0.2%
Asian	1,481	2.6%
Native Hawaiian and Other Pacific Islander	36	0.1%
Some other race	839	1.5%
Two or more races	3,872	6.7%
Hispanic or Latino (of any race)	2,189	3.8%

=== 2016–2020 American Community Survey ===
The 2016–2020 5-year American Community Survey estimates show that the median household income was $80,119 (with a margin of error of +/- $3,560) and the median family income was $97,777 (+/- $5,810). Males had a median income of $50,557 (+/- $1,820) versus $35,913 (+/- $2,149) for females. The median income for those above 16 years old was $42,138 (+/- $1,569). Approximately, 2.8% of families and 3.9% of the population were below the poverty line, including 5.3% of those under the age of 18 and 4.6% of those ages 65 or over.

=== 2010 census ===
As of the census of 2010, there were 52,575 people, 20,861 households, and 14,244 families residing in the city. The population density was 2,350.2 inhabitants per square mile (907.4/km^{2}). There were 21,717 housing units at an average density of 970.8 per square mile (374.8/km^{2}). The racial makeup of the city was 91.7% White, 3.7% African American, 0.2% Native American, 1.8% Asian, 0.1% Pacific Islander, 0.8% from other races, and 1.8% from two or more races. Hispanic or Latino of any race were 2.5% of the population.

There were 20,861 households, of which 33.0% had children under the age of 18 living with them, 53.8% were married couples living together, 10.0% had a female householder with no husband present, 4.5% had a male householder with no wife present, and 31.7% were non-families. 26.3% of all households were made up of individuals, and 9.5% had someone living alone who was 65 years of age or older. The average household size was 2.51 and the average family size was 3.05.

The median age in the city was 38.8 years. 23.2% of residents were under the age of 18; 8.3% were between the ages of 18 and 24; 26.9% were from 25 to 44; 30% were from 45 to 64; and 11.4% were 65 years of age or older. The gender makeup of the city was 48.2% male and 51.8% female.

=== 2000 census ===
As of the census of 2000, there were 51,381 people, 18,435 households, and 13,936 families residing in the city. The population density was 2,425.5 inhabitants per square mile (936.5/km^{2}). There were 18,776 housing units at an average density of 886.3 per square mile (342.2/km^{2}). The racial makeup of the city was 94.25% White, 2.80% African American, 0.20% Native American, 1.23% Asian, 0.01% Pacific Islander, 0.44% from other races, and 1.07% from two or more races. Hispanic or Latino of any race were 1.49% of the population.

There were 18,435 households, out of which 42.3% had children under the age of 18 living with them, 62.8% were married couples living together, 9.7% had a female householder with no husband present, and 24.4% were non-families. 20.3% of all households were made up of individuals, and 6.4% had someone living alone who was 65 years of age or older. The average household size was 2.78 and the average family size was 3.24.

In the city the population was spread out, with 30.0% under the age of 18, 7.4% from 18 to 24, 33.5% from 25 to 44, 21.3% from 45 to 64, and 7.8% who were 65 years of age or older. The median age was 34 years. For every 100 females, there were 95.0 males. For every 100 females age 18 and over, there were 90.6 males.

The median income for a household in the city was $57,898, and the median income for a family was $65,123. Males had a median income of $45,497 versus $30,295 for females. The per capita income for the city was $22,792. About 1.5% of families and 2.7% of the population were below the poverty line, including 2.6% of those under age 18 and 5.1% of those age 65 or over.

== Arts and culture ==
The Spencer Road Branch library, the largest and busiest within the St. Charles City-County Library District, is in St. Peters.

== Parks and recreation ==
St. Peters has the most extensive park system in St. Charles County. The city has over 1,000 acres (4,000,000 m^{2}) of parks and trails. Outdoor amenities include: recreation trails, playgrounds, picnic shelters and pavilions, athletic fields, fishing ponds, and landscape areas.

The St. Peters Rec-Plex, a 236,000 sq ft (21,900 m^{2}) family recreation and athletic training complex, is situated next to St. Peters City Hall. The Rec-Plex hosted the 2004 Olympic Diving Trials and is recognized as one of the USA's premier diving facilities. The Rec-Plex underwent an $18.5 million expansion in 2007.

== Government ==
St. Peters City Hall

Citizens elect a mayor and eight aldermen (two for each of four wards) to govern the city. The Mayor and Board of Aldermen appoint individuals to the positions of City Collector, City Clerk, and City Treasurer. A Municipal Judge of the 11th Judicial Circuit, also known as the St. Peters Municipal Court, has a four-year term. A City Administrator also works for the Mayor and Board of Aldermen.

The Board of Aldermen meets on the second and fourth Thursdays of each month, except the months of June, July, November and December when one meeting is held each month on a date scheduled with the Mayor.

City elections are held in April, per Missouri law for elected officials. Propositions may be voted upon at these elections, or others held in February, August or November.

The mayor is Len Pagano.

== Education ==
The north/northwest parts of St. Peters are in the Fort Zumwalt School District. The southern part of St. Peters is in the Francis Howell School District. A northeast sliver of St. Peters is in the St. Charles R-VI School District.

Three public high schools are within St. Peters city limits: two in the Fort Zumwalt district, Fort Zumwalt South High School with an enrollment of 1,700 students, and Fort Zumwalt East High School (1,100 students) which opened in 2007, and another, Francis Howell North High School (1,690 students) in the Francis Howell district. Some high school students from St. Peters attend schools in surrounding communities such as Francis Howell Central High School in neighboring Cottleville, and Fort Zumwalt North and Fort Zumwalt West High Schools in O'Fallon.

Other public schools in the city include Fairmount, Hawthorn, Lewis & Clark, Mid Rivers, Progress South, St. Peters, and Warren Elementary Schools, as well as DuBray and Fort Zumwalt South Middle Schools.

The city limits also contain the private Lutheran High School of St Charles County.

== Infrastructure ==
St. Peters is home to Barnes-Jewish St. Peters Hospital, the county's second busiest after St. Joseph Health Center in St. Charles. Barnes-Jewish St. Peters Hospital serves a large portion of St. Charles County, Lincoln County, and Pike County; it is St. Charles County's second largest hospital, with 175 rooms, and a satellite location of the Alvin J. Siteman Cancer Center.

The city's "Recycle City" opened in April 1997 and has the ability to recycle various types of material which is then sold to companies that use recycled goods in products. In 2007, Recycle City recycled 12,522,767 pounds of material.
