= Fort Zumwalt South High School =

High school in Saint Peters, Missouri, U.S.

Coordinates: 38°47′19″N 90°40′9″W

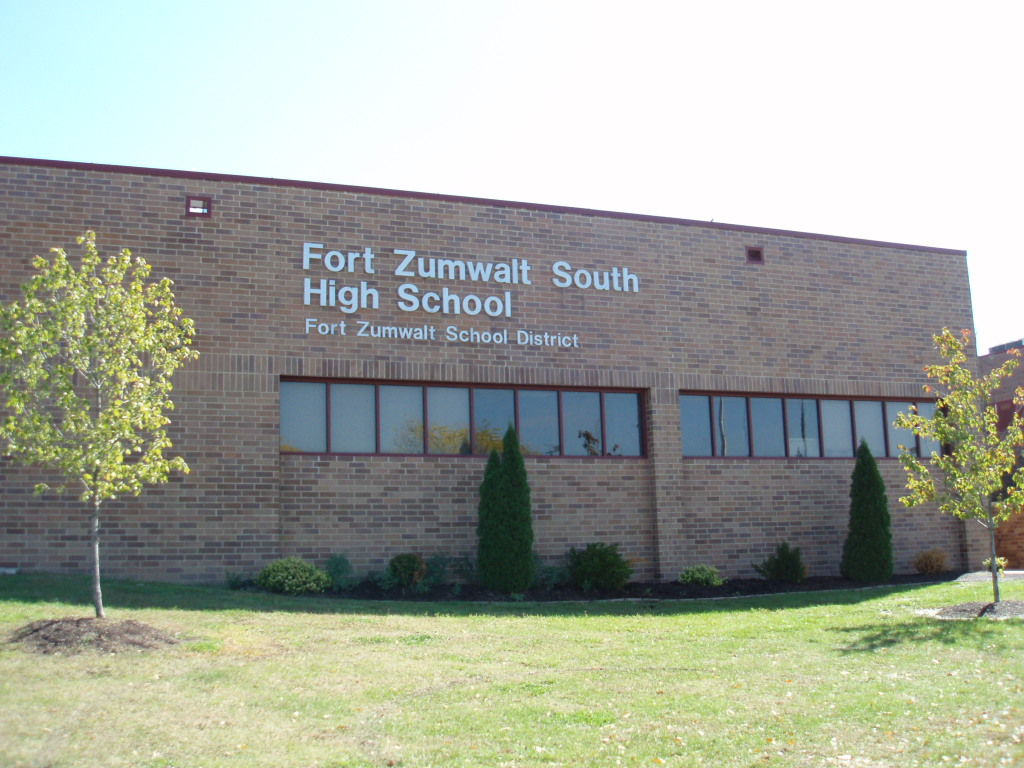

Location
- 8050 Mexico Road; Saint Peters, Missouri 63376; United States

Information
- Type: Public school
- Established: 1987; 39 years ago
- Principal: Kevin Grawer
- Teaching staff: 90.30 (FTE)
- Grades: 9–12
- Enrollment: 1,245 (2023–24)
- Student to teacher ratio: 13.79
- Colors: Red, black, and white
- Athletics conference: Gateway North
- Nickname: Bulldogs
- Newspaper: The Dog Dispatch
- Yearbook: The Southpaw
- Website: shs.fz.k12.mo.us

Fort Zumwalt South High School (FZS) is in the Fort Zumwalt School District in Saint Peters, Missouri, United States.

== History ==
In 1987, FZS was the second high school to be founded in the Fort Zumwalt District (after Fort Zumwalt North).

The school opened in 1987 with slightly over 400 students, and dramatically increased to over 2,600 by 1998, making it one of the largest schools in the state. When West High was completed, the student population dropped to around 2,100. Enrollment increased to 2,300 before subsiding to around 1,400 with the completion of East High.

== Academics ==
FZS participates in the A+ program. In 2023, the school was recognized as exemplary by the U.S. Department of Education. In 2023, South High was named a National Blue Ribbon School.

== Athletics ==
Fort Zumwalt South's winter guard placed 1st in their division in 2011 and again in 2013.

The Fort Zumwalt South Bulldogs won the Missouri State Championship in cross country in 2005 and 2006.

In 2009, Fort Zumwalt South won the class 4 Missouri State Championship in baseball.

In May 2012, the South High boys' volleyball team won the Class 3 Missouri State Championship.

In 2018, 2020, and 2021 the boys' varsity soccer team won the Class 3 Missouri State Championship. In 2021, 2022, and 2023 the varsity girls' soccer team won the class 3 Missouri State Championship. With the 2021 title, Fort Zumwalt South became the first Missouri public school to win state championships in boys' and girls' soccer in the same school year.

== Student life ==
Many extracurricular activities are offered, including basketball, soccer, swimming, volleyball, football, marching band, choir, theatre troupe, National Honor Society, and other sport, academic, and arts activities.

In February 2013 and February 2014, South High's science bowl team won the regional competition allowing them to represent Missouri at the National Science Bowl competition in Washington D.C.

== Notable alumni ==
- Steve Colyer – former Major League Baseball player
- Joy Dunne – collegiate and national hockey player; 2026 Olympic gold medalist
- Tom Layne – former Major League Baseball player
