= Sams Creek (Peruque Creek tributary) =

Stream in the American state of Missouri

Coordinates: 38°47′36″N 90°54′15″W

Sams Creek is a stream in St. Charles and Warren counties in the U.S. state of Missouri. It is a tributary of Peruque Creek.

Sams Creek possibly has the name of Sam Price, a pioneer citizen.

== See also ==
- List of rivers of Missouri
