= Francis Howell Central High School =

Francis Howell Central High

Location
- 5199 Highway N Cottleville, Missouri 63304; United States; 38°44′51″N 90°38′43″W

Information
- Type: Public
- Established: 1997
- School district: Francis Howell School District
- Principal: Suzanne M. Leake
- Teaching staff: 91.71 (FTE)
- Grades: 9–12
- Enrollment: 1,741 (2023–2024)
- Student to teacher ratio: 18.98
- Colors: Navy and silver
- Nickname: Spartans
- Website: fhc.fhsdschools.org

Francis Howell Central High School (FHC) is the third high school created in the Francis Howell School District. The school is located in Cottleville, Missouri, but a large part of its student population comes from its larger neighbor St. Peters. Home of the Spartans, Francis Howell Central is a four-year comprehensive high school offering programs in college preparatory, vocational, honors/advanced credit, Advanced Placement and a special education program.

== History ==
FHC opened in the fall of 1997 with only freshmen and sophomore students. The school had been built in a series of phases; much of what is visible today had not yet been constructed at the time of its opening. The school's first principal was Don Muench. The building opened with relatively few teachers, due to low student enrollment at the time. Eventually the school expanded to include junior and senior grades as well.

=== Out-of-district students ===
In 2013, the Missouri Supreme Court upheld a law that allowed students attending unaccredited school districts to transfer to other schools. A lawful decision was made that students from a neighboring county's failing Normandy School District, which was predominantly black, would attend the majority white Francis Howell School District.

This led to Francis Howell district parents voicing concerns against the transfer of students even though they would pay out-of-district tuition. The town hall meeting went on for over two hours with almost 3,000 people in attendance. One parent at Francis Howell Central High School said, "I deserve to not have to worry about my children getting stabbed, or taking a drug, or getting robbed" which was supported by many cheers. Many of these parents were later criticized by some as racist and classist. Other parents drew similarities between their current controversy and that of desegregation busing during the Civil Rights Movement.

In 2014, the Francis Howell School District decided it would no longer accept out-of-district students. The Missouri State Board of Education had recently reconstituted the Normandy District as the Normandy Schools Collaborative and eliminated its "unaccredited" status.

== Athletics ==
The following MSHSAA sanctioned activities are available at Central:

Fall sports

- Cross country
- Girls' softball
- Marching Band
- Football
- Girls' volleyball
- Boys' soccer
- Girls' tennis
- Boys' swimming
- Girls' golf

Winter sports

- Boys' basketball
- Girls' basketball
- Boys' wrestling
- Girls' swimming
- Winter Guard

Spring sports

- Track
- Baseball
- Boys' rugby
- Girls' soccer
- Boys' golf
- Boys' tennis
- Boys' volleyball
- Girls' lacrosse

Year round

- Bowling
- Cheerleading
- Forensics
- Pompom

== Band ==
The Francis Howell Central Spartan Bands have been involved in Central's community for over 20 years. Band configurations include, FHC Spartan Regiment, FHC A-Band (Pep Band), Concert Band, Wind Ensemble, and Jazz Ensemble, among others.

The band raised $2,000 in 2010 for the St. James Marching Band, whose members were involved in a bus crash.

On October 5, 2024, FHC's marching band was certified as a BOA regional finalist, placing 5th in their class, and 10th overall at the BOA Memphis Regional Championship competition.

== Notable alumni ==
- Pierre Desir – former NFL cornerback, 2013 Cliff Harris Award winner
- Dominick Puni – NFL guard for the San Francisco 49ers
