= Susan Morey =

American mathematician

Susan Morey is an American mathematician and a professor and chair of the Mathematics department at Texas State University in San Marcos, Texas.

== Education and career ==
Morey received a B.S. in mathematics with Honors from the University of Missouri in 1990 and a Ph.D. in mathematics from Rutgers University in 1995. Her dissertation The Equations of Rees Algebras of ideals of Low Codimension was supervised by Wolmer Vasconcelos. After receiving her Ph.D., Morey held a postdoctoral position at the University of Texas at Austin. She became an assistant professor at Texas State (then Southwest Texas State University) in 1997. Morey was awarded tenure and promotion to associate professor in 2001 and promotion to full professor in 2010. She became chair of the mathematics department in 2015. She received the Everette Swinney Excellence in Teaching Award from Texas State in 2016.

Morey is known for her work in commutative algebra, in particular, for work on normal rings and algebraic and combinatorial properties of edge ideals of graphs and hypergraphs. Her work is published in the Journal of Pure and Applied Algebra, the Journal of Algebraic Combinatorics, Communications in Algebra, Progress in Commutative Algebra, the Proceedings of the American Mathematical Society, and other journals.

Morey was selected a Fellow of the Association for Women in Mathematics in the Class of 2021 "for inspiring and mentoring several generations of women mathematicians, whom she has helped and encouraged to reach their full potential; and for support of graduate students through the Stokes Alliance for Minority Participation".
