= Fort Zumwalt School District =

School district in Missouri, U.S.

Fort Zumwalt Public Schools
- Fort Zumwalt School District – Pushing for Positive Peer Influence

Location
- 555 E Terra Ln; O'Fallon, Missouri 63366 Midwest

District information
- Type: Local (Public) school district
- Motto: Pushing For Positive Peer Influence
- Grades: K–12
- Established: 1949
- Superintendent: Dr. Henry St. Pierre
- Schools: 25
- Budget: $237.6 million
- NCES District ID: 2908370

Students and staff
- Students: 18,300
- Teachers: 1,371
- Staff: 1,271
- Student–teacher ratio: 19

Other information
- Source: Missouri Department of Elementary & Secondary Education
- Website: www.fz.k12.mo.us

Fort Zumwalt School District (FZSD) is headquartered in O'Fallon, Missouri, United States.

The largest school district in St. Charles County, the district includes all of Saint Paul, most of Josephville, much of Dardenne Prairie, Flint Hill, O'Fallon, and Saint Peters, and parts of Cottleville and Wentzville.

== Schools ==
=== High schools ===
- Comprehensive
  - Fort Zumwalt East High School (Saint Peters)
  - Fort Zumwalt North High School (O'Fallon)
  - Fort Zumwalt South High School (Saint Peters)
  - Fort Zumwalt West High School (O'Fallon)
- Alternative
  - Fort Zumwalt Hope High School (O'Fallon)

=== Middle schools ===
- Fort Zumwalt DuBray Middle School (Saint Peters)
- Fort Zumwalt North Middle School (O'Fallon)
- Fort Zumwalt South Middle School (Saint Peters)
- Fort Sumwalt West Middle School (O'Fallon)

=== Elementary schools ===
- Dardenne Elementary School (O'Fallon)
- Emge Elementary School (O'Fallon)
- Flint Hill Elementary School (Flint Hill)
- Forest Park Elementary School (O'Fallon)
- Hawthorn Elementary School (Saint Peters)
- J. L. Mudd Elementary School (O'Fallon)
- Lewis and Clark Elementary School (Saint Peters)
- Mid Rivers Elementary School (Saint Peters)
- Mt. Hope Elementary School (O'Fallon)
- Ostmann Elementary School (Dardenne Prairie)
- Pheasant Point Elementary School (O'Fallon)
- Progress South Elementary School (Saint Peters)
- Rock Creek Elementary School (O'Fallon)
- St. Peters Elementary School (Saint Peters)
- Twin Chimneys Elementary School (O'Fallon)
- Westhoff Elementary School (O'Fallon)

=== Education centers ===
- Fort Zumwalt Early Childhood Center (Saint Peters)
  - The district purchased the ex-Sanford-Brown College/Le Cordon Bleu College in 2016 so it could develop this site. The purchase price was $7 million. The property had 71,000 square feet (6,600 m^{2}) of area.
- Mike Clemens Center for Adaptive Learning (O'Fallon)
