= O'Fallon, Missouri =

- City
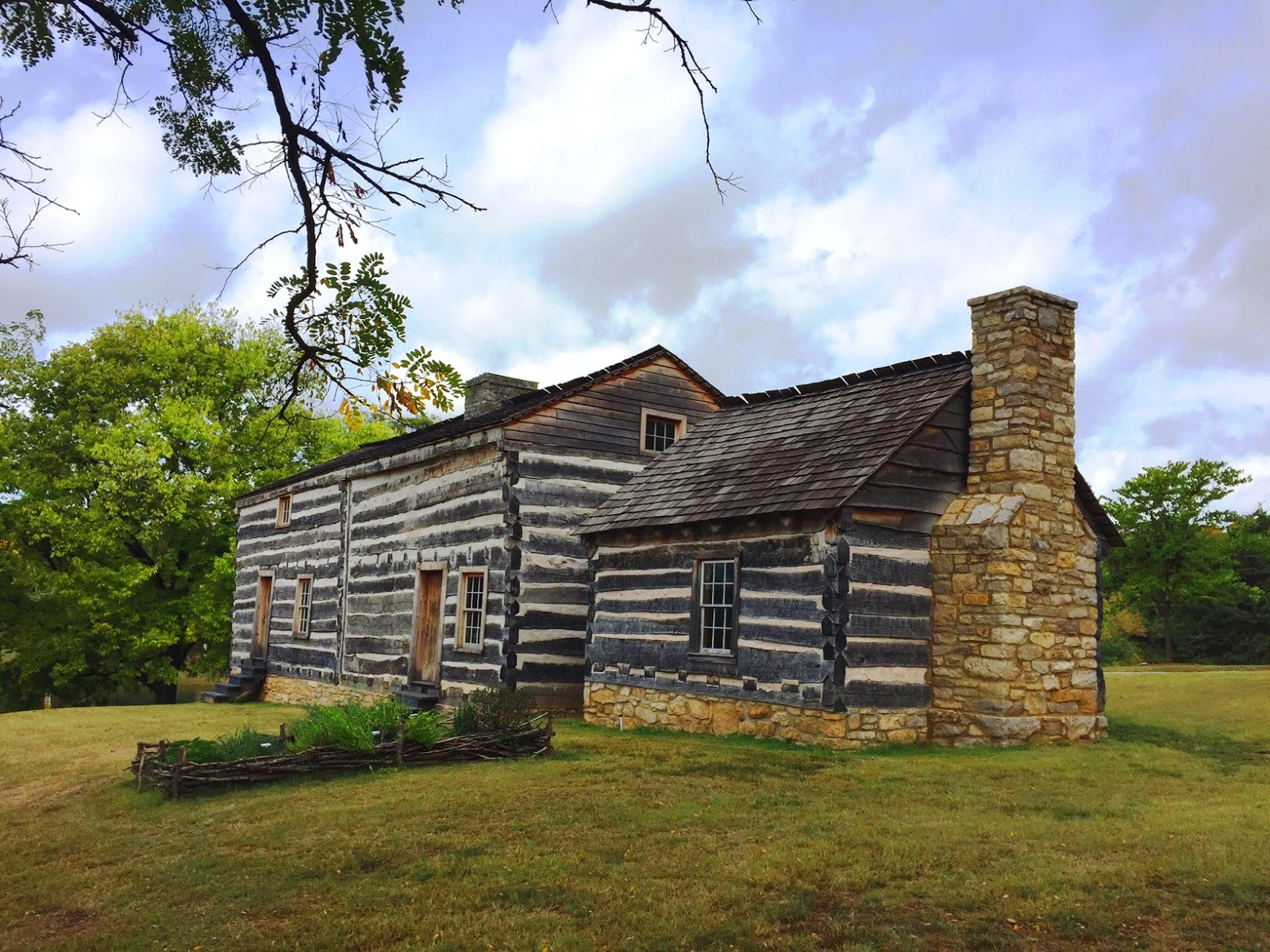
- Fort Zumwalt Park

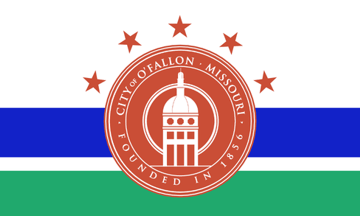
- Flag Seal
- Motto: Tradition with Vision
- Location in the state of Missouri
- Coordinates: 38°47′04″N 90°43′12″W
- Country: United States
- State: Missouri
- County: St. Charles
- Metro: Greater St. Louis
- First Settled: 1856
- Incorporated: September 25, 1912

Government
  - Type: Mayor-council government
  - Mayor: Bill Hennessy

Area
  - City: 30.51 sq mi (79.01 km^{2})
  - Land: 30.50 sq mi (79.00 km^{2})
  - Water: 0.0039 sq mi (0.01 km^{2})
- Elevation: 614 ft (187 m)

Population (2020)
  - City: 91,316
  - Estimate (2023): 94,074
  - Density: 2,993.7/sq mi (1,155.87/km^{2})
  - Metro: 2,810,056 (US: 19th)
- Time zone: UTC−6 (CST)
  - Summer (DST): UTC−5 (CDT)
- ZIP code: 63366, 63368
- Area code: 636
- FIPS code: 29-54074
- GNIS feature ID: 2395303
- Website: www.ofallonmo.gov

O'Fallon (/oʊˈfælən/ oh-FAL-ən) is a city in St. Charles County, Missouri, United States. It is part of the St. Louis metropolitan statistical area, along Interstates 64 and 70 between Lake St. Louis and St. Peters. As of the 2020 census, O'Fallon had a population of 91,316, making it St. Louis's most populous suburb as well as the most populous municipality in St. Charles County and the 7th-most populous in Missouri. O'Fallon's namesake in St. Clair County, Illinois, is also part of the St. Louis region. The two cities are one of the few pairs of same-named municipalities to be part of the same metro area.

== History ==
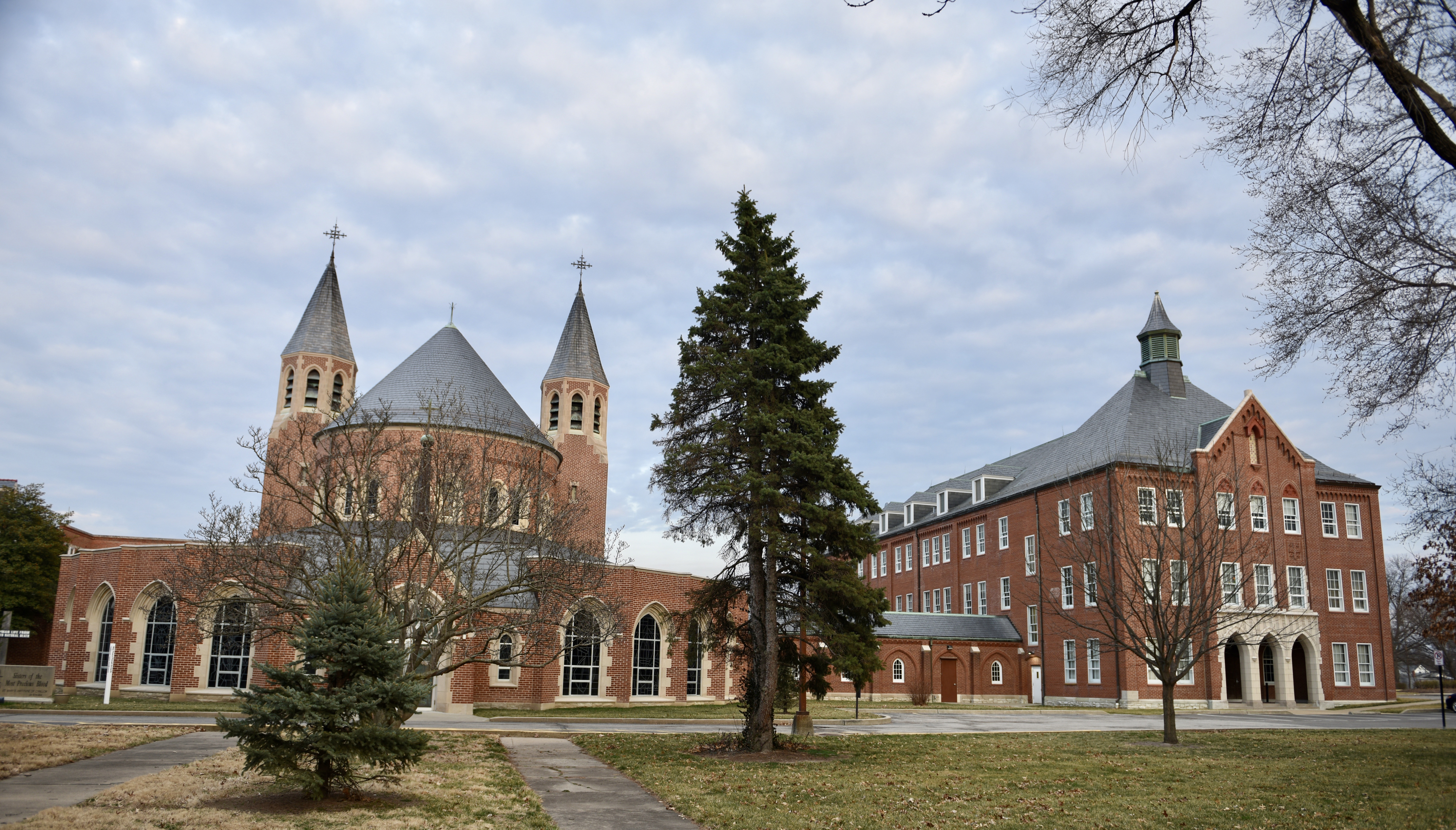
St. Mary's Institute of O'Fallon

O'Fallon was founded in 1856 by Nicholas Krekel. The community was named by Krekel's older brother, Judge Arnold Krekel, after John O'Fallon, the president of the North Missouri Railroad. A post office called O'Fallon has been in operation since 1859 with Nicholas Krekel as first postmaster. The St. Mary's Institute of O'Fallon was listed on the National Register of Historic Places in 2007.

In 2006, Money magazine named O'Fallon 39th in its "Best 100 Places to Live". The magazine also ranked O'Fallon 68th out of 100 in 2008, 26th out of 100 in 2010, and 42nd out of 100 in 2017.

== Geography ==
According to the United States Census Bureau, the city has an area of 29.20 square miles (75.63 km^{2}), of which 29.19 square miles (75.60 km^{2}) are land and 0.01 square miles (0.03 km^{2}) is covered by water.

=== Climate ===
O'Fallon has a humid subtropical climate (Köppen Cfa). Summers are hot and humid, while winters are moderately cold.

Climate data for O'Fallon, Missouri
Month	Jan	Feb	Mar	Apr	May	Jun	Jul	Aug	Sep	Oct	Nov	Dec	Year
Record high °F (°C)	76 (24)	85 (29)	88 (31)	94 (34)	92 (33)	97 (36)	105 (41)	107 (42)	102 (39)	95 (35)	85 (29)	76 (24)	107 (42)
Mean daily maximum °F (°C)	38 (3)	45 (7)	55 (13)	66 (19)	75 (24)	83 (28)	88 (31)	87 (31)	80 (27)	69 (21)	55 (13)	42 (6)	65 (19)
Mean daily minimum °F (°C)	18 (−8)	24 (−4)	33 (1)	44 (7)	54 (12)	63 (17)	68 (20)	66 (19)	58 (14)	45 (7)	35 (2)	24 (−4)	44 (7)
Record low °F (°C)	−23 (−31)	−14 (−26)	−11 (−24)	18 (−8)	26 (−3)	39 (4)	45 (7)	36 (2)	27 (−3)	19 (−7)	−5 (−21)	−28 (−33)	−28 (−33)
Average precipitation inches (mm)	1.79 (45)	2.26 (57)	3.38 (86)	3.58 (91)	4.34 (110)	3.62 (92)	4.18 (106)	3.13 (80)	3.29 (84)	3.10 (79)	3.56 (90)	2.41 (61)	38.64 (981)

== Demographics ==
Historical population
Census	Pop.	Note	%±
1880	295		—
1920	588		—
1930	594		1.0%
1940	618		4.0%
1950	789		27.7%
1960	3,770		377.8%
1970	7,018		86.2%
1980	8,677		23.6%
1990	18,698		115.5%
2000	46,169		146.9%
2010	79,329		71.8%
2020	91,316		15.1%
U.S. Decennial Census

=== Racial and ethnic composition ===
O'Fallon city, Missouri – Racial and ethnic composition Note: the U.S. census treats Hispanic/Latino as an ethnic category. This table excludes Latinos from the racial categories and assigns them to a separate category. Hispanics/Latinos may be of any race.
Race / Ethnicity (NH = Non-Hispanic)	Pop 2000	Pop 2010	Pop 2020	% 2000	% 2010	% 2020
White alone (NH)	43,576	69,979	74,340	94.38%	88.21%	81.41%
Black or African American alone (NH)	1,029	3,135	4,568	2.23%	3.95%	5.00%
Native American or Alaska Native alone (NH)	96	162	140	0.21%	0.20%	0.15%
Asian alone (NH)	340	2,485	3,688	0.74%	3.13%	4.04%
Pacific Islander alone (NH)	10	40	79	0.02%	0.05%	0.09%
Some Other Race alone (NH)	40	105	276	0.09%	0.13%	0.30%
Mixed Race or Multi-Racial (NH)	407	1,264	4,586	0.88%	1.59%	5.02%
Hispanic or Latino (any race)	671	2,159	3,639	1.45%	2.72%	3.99%
Total	46,169	79,329	91,316	100.00%	100.00%	100.00%

=== 2020 census ===
As of the 2020 census, O'Fallon had a population of 91,316 in 33,431 households, including 23,754 families. The population density was 2,994.0 per square mile (1,155.9/km^{2}).

The median age was 37.8 years. 26.0% of residents were under the age of 18 and 13.3% of residents were 65 years of age or older. For every 100 females there were 93.8 males, and for every 100 females age 18 and over there were 91.0 males age 18 and over.

100.0% of residents lived in urban areas, while 0.0% lived in rural areas.

Of the 33,431 households, 38.2% had children under the age of 18 living in them. Of all households, 57.8% were married-couple households, 13.3% were households with a male householder and no spouse or partner present, and 23.1% were households with a female householder and no spouse or partner present. About 22.0% of all households were made up of individuals and 9.3% had someone living alone who was 65 years of age or older. The average household size was 2.8 and the average family size was 3.2.

There were 34,426 housing units, of which 2.9% were vacant. The homeowner vacancy rate was 0.8% and the rental vacancy rate was 6.4%.

=== 2016–2020 American Community Survey ===
The 2016–2020 5-year American Community Survey estimates show that the median household income was $92,498 (with a margin of error of +/- $3,539) and the median family income was $106,419 (+/- $3,781). Males had a median income of $56,446 (+/- $2,450) versus $36,747 (+/- $2,327) for females. The median income for those above 16 years old was $45,900 (+/- $2,496). Approximately, 2.6% of families and 4.6% of the population were below the poverty line, including 5.1% of those under the age of 18 and 3.9% of those ages 65 or over.

=== 2010 census ===
As of the census of 2010, 79,329 people, 28,234 households, and 21,436 families were residing in the city. The population density was 2,717.7 inhabitants per square mile (1,049.3/km^{2}). The 29,376 housing units averaged 1,006.4 per square mile (388.6/km^{2}). The racial makeup of the city was 89.9% White, 4.0% African American, 0.2% Native American, 3.2% Asian, 0.9% from other races, and 1.8% from two or more races. Hispanics or Latinos of any race were 2.7% of the population.

Of the 28,234 households, 44.7% had children under 18 living with them, 61.6% were married couples living together, 10.0% had a female householder with no husband present, 4.3% had a male householder with no wife present, and 24.1% were not families. About 19.3% of all households were made up of individuals, and 6.2% had someone living alone who was 65 or older. The average household size was 2.80, and the average family size was 3.23.

The median age in the city was 34.3 years. The age distribution of the city was 30% under 18; 7.1% between 18 and 24; 30.8% from 25 to 44; 23.1% from 45 to 64; and 8.9% at 65 or older. The gender makeup of the city was 48.8% male and 51.2% female.

== Economy ==
Mastercard has a major presence in O'Fallon. Venture Stores was headquartered and maintained a distribution center in O'Fallon, until its dissolution. The buildings are now occupied by True Manufacturing. Air Evac Lifeteam, a medical helicopter service for the rural areas of the Ozarks, moved its headquarters to O'Fallon in 2015.

== Parks and recreation ==
- Civic Park, a 20-acre (8.1 ha) park, it features Alligator's Creek Aquatic Center, a bandstand and amphitheater.
- Dames Park is a 59-acre (24 ha) sports park with three football fields and a fitness course.
- Fort Zumwalt Park is a 47.5-acre (19.2 ha) park featuring a fishing lake, a disc golf course, playgrounds, and historic Fort Zumwalt.
- Knaust Park is a 6-acre (24,000 m^{2}) park with a playground and walking path.
- O'Fallon Sports Park is a 95-acre (38 ha) soccer complex with 12 fields, playgrounds, and concessions. It is also home to the Renaud Spirit Center.
- Ozzie Smith Sports Complex is a 76-acre (31 ha) baseball/softball complex with seven diamonds, adjacent to CarShield Field.
- Westhoff Park is a 65-acre (26 ha) park featuring baseball diamonds, sand volleyball courts, horseshoe pits, basketball courts, tennis and handball courts, and a skate park.

== Sports ==
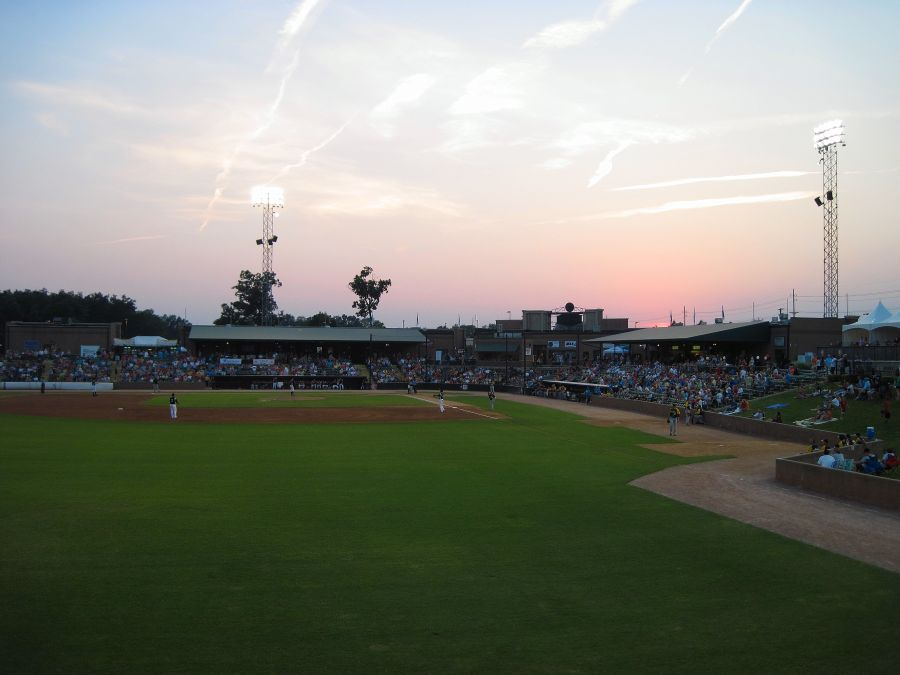
CarShield Field

O'Fallon was the home of the River City Rascals independent Frontier League baseball team. The Rascals played at CarShield Field in O'Fallon, which was built in 1999. It is located on Tom Ginnever Boulevard and T.R. Hughes Boulevard near downtown. The organization ceased operations after the 2019 season. The O'Fallon Hoots and the CarShield Collegiate League now play at the stadium.

== Government ==
O'Fallon operates under a charter form of government. The mayor serves four-year terms without term limits and is also the President of the City Council. The 10-member council consists of two members from each of the five wards; the council had 8 members until the fifth ward was created in 2010. City council members served two-year terms until 2010, when they switched to three-year terms. The council elects a President Pro Tempore from among its members, who presides over the council in the mayor's absence.

Bill Hennessy has served as mayor since 2009. The most senior member of the council is Debbie Cook, who has served Ward 5 since 2014. In January 2022, city councilwoman Katie Gatewood became the first elected official in O'Fallon to be impeached and removed from office. She was accused of impeding the duties of the police chief and lying to the Council about the identity of a whistleblower.

O'Fallon City Council Composition (July 2025)
Ward	Name	First elected	Term expires
1	John Roth	2025 (appointed)	2026
1	Oliver Wexler	2025	2028
2	Brian Boyer	2025	2028
2	Lisa Thompson	2020	2026
3	Nathan Bibb	2019	2026
3	Steve Koskela	2022	2028
4	Jeff Kuehn (President Pro Tem)	2017	2026
4	Amanda Taylor	2025	2028
5	Debbie Cook	2014	2028
5	Linda Ragsdale	2025	2028

== Education and libraries ==
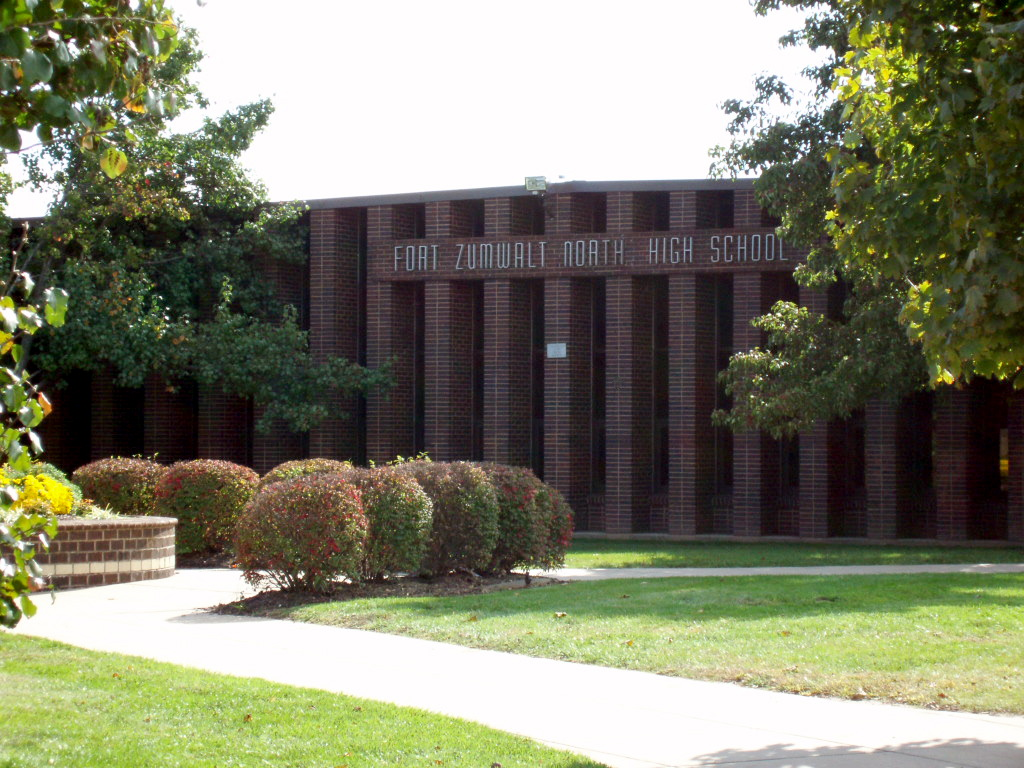
Fort Zumwalt North High School

O'Fallon is served mostly by the Fort Zumwalt School District. The westernmost part is served by the Wentzville R-IV School District. The south to southeastern part of the city is served by the Francis Howell R-III School District.

Public schools within the O'Fallon city limits are as follows:

- Fort Zumwalt district:
  - Dardenne, Emge, Forest Park, Mt. Hope, J. L. Mudd, Pheasant point, Progress South, Rock Creek, Twin Chimneys, and Westhof elementary schools
  - North Middle School, South Middle School, Fort Zumwalt West Middle School
  - Fort Zumwalt North High School, Fort Zumwalt West High School, Hope High School
  - Fort Zumwalt South High School is just outside of the city limits. Ostmann Elementary School is in adjacent Dardenne Prairie.
- Wentzville district:
  - Crossroads Elementary School and Discovery Ridge Elementary School
  - Frontier Middle School
  - Liberty High School
- Francis Howell district:
  - John Weldon Elementary School and Francis Howell Middle School are outside of the city limits.

Private schools:

- St. Dominic High School is a private Catholic school located in O'Fallon; Christian High School is a nondenominational Christian secondary school also located in O'Fallon.
- Living Word Christian High School is in O'Fallon.
- Assumption Catholic School is in O'Fallon.
- First Baptist Christan Academy is in O'Fallon.

Satellite campuses of Webster University and Lindenwood University are located in O'Fallon.

O'Fallon is served by the St. Charles City-County Library system, which has three branches in the area, two standard (Deer Run and Middendorf-Kredell) and one "express" location (Library Express at Winghaven).

== Infrastructure ==
While the City is within the jurisdiction of multiple agencies, fire protection is mostly provided by the O'Fallon Fire Protection District, which in 2007 became the first internationally accredited fire agency in Missouri. The award was made by the Center for Public Safety Excellence's Commission on Fire Accreditation International, which has approved accreditation status for only 120 fire agencies worldwide.

The western portion of the city is served by the Wentzville Fire Protection District. The eastern portion of the city is served by Central County Fire Rescue. The southern portion of the city is served by the Cottleville Fire Protection District. The far southwestern portion of the city is served by the New Melle Fire District. An extremely small portion of the city is served by the Lake Saint Louis Fire District. The city also features The Shops at Laura Hills, a small shopping complex on Highway K. The complex features Target, Petsmart, Famous Footwear, Rally House, Bath and Body Works, Chick Fil-A, and a White Castle.

== Notable people ==
- Adam Beaudry, soccer player
- Joe Boyle, Major League Baseball pitcher
- Napheesa Collier, Minnesota Lynx forward, 2019 WNBA Rookie of the Year
- Harry Gilmer, All-American college and Pro Bowl football player and former head coach of the Detroit Lions
- Nathan Heald, U.S. Army officer during the War of 1812, in command of Fort Dearborn in Chicago
- Megan Meier, cyberbullying and suicide victim
- Tim Ream, soccer player
- Jincy Roese, hockey player and 2022 Olympian
- Josh Sargent, soccer player
- Kyle Sherman, bowler
