= Fort Zumwalt East High School =

High school in Saint Peters, Missouri, U.S.

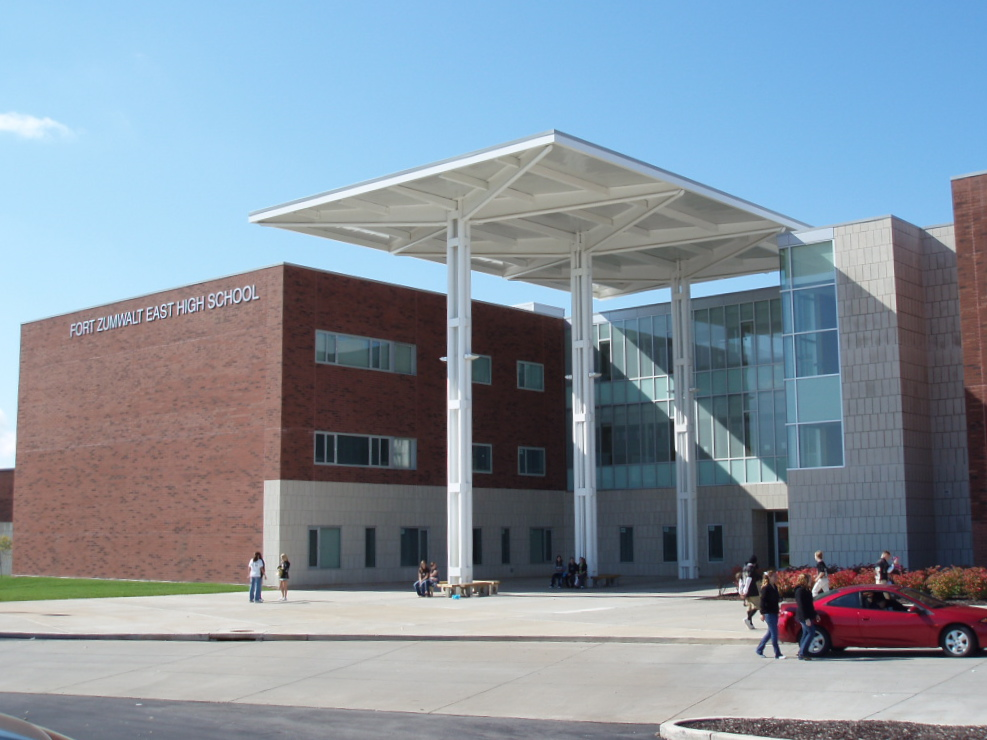

Location
- 600 1st Executive Ave; St. Peters, Missouri 63376; United States; 38°47′19″N 90°35′7″W

Information
- Type: Public school
- Motto: Educate, Achieve, Succeed Together
- Established: 2007; 19 years ago
- Principal: Ashlee Vaughn
- Teaching staff: 90.90 (FTE)
- Grades: 9–12
- Enrollment: 1,202 (2023–2024)
- Student to teacher ratio: 13.22
- Colors: Black and old gold
- Nickname: Lions
- Website: ehs.fz.k12.mo.us

Fort Zumwalt East High School (FZE), is the fourth high school in the Fort Zumwalt School District, located in St. Peters, Missouri, United States.

== History ==
The school first opened to freshman and sophomore students on August 20, 2007. Encompassing 43 acres (170,000 m^{2}) formerly known as Koenig's Farm, the five-story property was built with funds from a no-tax increase bond issue. School highlights include a distance learning laboratory, two gymnasiums, artificial turf on the soccer/football field, an all-weather track, and over 200,000 square feet (19,000 m^{2}) of floor space.
