= Fort Zumwalt West High School =

Public high school in O'Fallon, Missouri, U.S.

Coordinates: 38°47′22″N 90°43′48″W

Location
- 1251 Turtle Creek Dr. O'Fallon, MO 63366; United States

Information
- Type: Public School
- Established: 1998
- Principal: Kevin Morrison
- Faculty: 150+
- Teaching staff: 122.40 (FTE)
- Grades: 9th – 12th
- Enrollment: 1,701 (2023–2024)
- Student to teacher ratio: 13.90
- Colors: Purple, silver and black
- Athletics: Boys Sports: Football, Wrestling, Soccer, Basketball, Baseball, Tennis, Golf, Swimming, Volleyball, Track, XC, Lacrosse, Hockey. Water Polo (coed) Girls Sports: Basketball, Soccer, Softball, Volleyball, Swimming, Track, XC, Tennis, Golf, Dance, Cheer
- Athletics conference: Gateway Athletic Conference South
- Nickname: Jaguars
- Website: whs.fz.k12.mo.us

Fort Zumwalt West High School, the third high school established in the Fort Zumwalt School District, is located in O'Fallon, Missouri. First opened for the 1998–1999 school year, the school now has an approximate enrollment of 2,000 students with an average daily attendance rate of nearly 94%.

== Academics ==
The school's ACT scores averaged 22.1 in 2016, with 98.6% of graduates taking the test due to the statewide free ACT test. The graduation rate remains around 91%, with 42% attending four year college/university, and 32% attending two year college/university. The dropout rate is 1.9%, as opposed to 4.0% at the state level.

With approximately 118 teachers, around 83% have a master's degree or higher, and 100% have regular teaching certificates. They average 9.3 years of teaching experience. There is an average of 17 students per classroom.

The school offers numerous Pre-AP and AP courses such as Calculus, Physics, Chemistry, Government, World History, US History, Biology, Literature and Composition, and many more. The 2023 class has four National Merit Scholars.

== Sports and activities ==
The Fort Zumwalt West Women's soccer team won the school's first state title in the 2007 season, and the West dance team won state in 2019. Teams with Final Four appearances include Girls Basketball, Football, Wrestling, Baseball, and Girls Soccer. The Dance team was the 2017 Runner-up at the National Dance Competition in Orlando. My King Studio of Dance has hosted its annual recital multiple times at the high school, most recently in 2023.

== Notable alumni ==
- Alyssa Mautz (2007), former NWSL soccer player
- Cody Asche (2008), former MLB player
- T. J. Moe (2009), former NFL wide receiver
