= Fort Zumwalt North High School =

Public secondary school in O'Fallon, Missouri, U.S.

Coordinates: 38°49′11″N 90°40′5″W

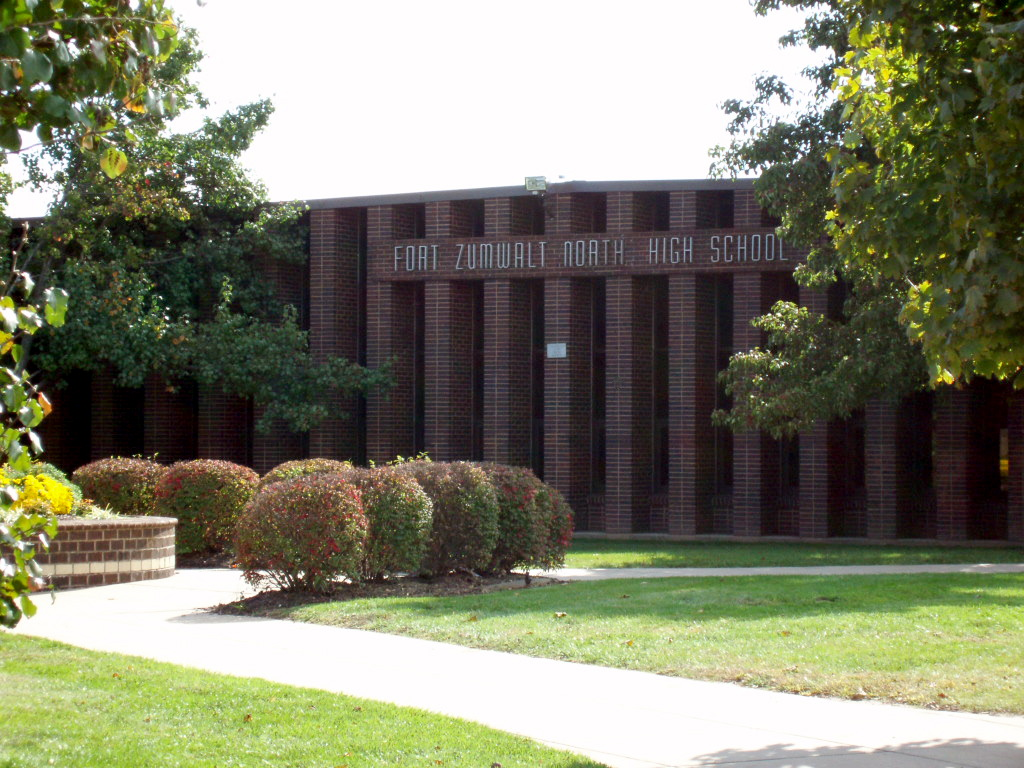

Location
- 1230 Tom Ginnever Ave; O'Fallon, Missouri 63366; United States

Information
- Type: Public school
- Established: 1960; 66 years ago
- School district: Fort Zumwalt School District
- Principal: Ronald Entwistle
- Teaching staff: 112.61 (FTE
- Grades: 9–12
- Enrollment: 1,528 (2023–24)
- Student to teacher ratio: 13.57
- Colors: Green and gold
- Nickname: Panthers
- ACT average: 22.0 (2018–19)
- Graduation rate: 95%
- Website: nhs.fz.k12.mo.us

Fort Zumwalt North High School, the first high school established in its Fort Zumwalt School District, is located in O'Fallon, Missouri. Established in 1960 as Fort Zumwalt High School, the school moved to its current location in 1976. "North" was added to the school's name when the district's second high school opened in 1987.

== History ==
The district's high school students attended Wentzville or Saint Charles schools until 1960, when a standalone two-wing high school was built for grades 9–12 at Sonderen Street. In 1967, another wing and a major wing addition were added. After the 1975–1976 school year, the high school swapped addresses with Cool Springs Junior High School, on Cool Springs Road (later renamed Tom Ginnever Avenue). The relocated Cool Springs school then took on the name Central Junior High (and since 1987, North Middle School).

In January 2022, Ronald Entwistle was appointed as Zumwalt North principal, succeeding Joseph Sutton in July 2022.

== Athletics ==
Fort Zumwalt North's football team has a recent history of success. During the 2021 season, they won their 8th consecutive conference title (their first title being in 2014), tying a state record for most consecutive conference titles. They also won their district title for a seventh consecutive season in 2020. In addition, they made it to the state Final Four in four seasons since 2016, appearing in the class 5 State Championship that year:

- 2020: Final Four (lost to Jackson in the semi's). 11–2 season record.
- 2019: Final Four (lost to Carthage in the semi's). 12–1 season record.
- 2017: Final Four (lost to Pattonville in the semi's). 12–1 season record.
- 2016: Show-Me-Bowl (lost to Vianney). 12–2 season record.

Previously, the Panthers were undefeated during the 2015 season until they lost in the quarterfinals to Battle High School, for an 11–1 overall record. The 2014–15 football season was very similar with a 10–2 overall record. FZ North's 2016–17 season included a win over Battle.

== Notable alumni ==
- Susan Morey – mathematician
- Thomas Morse – composer
- George Paz – former chairman and CEO of Express Scripts
- Clint Watts – national security analyst
