= Cottleville, Missouri =

- City
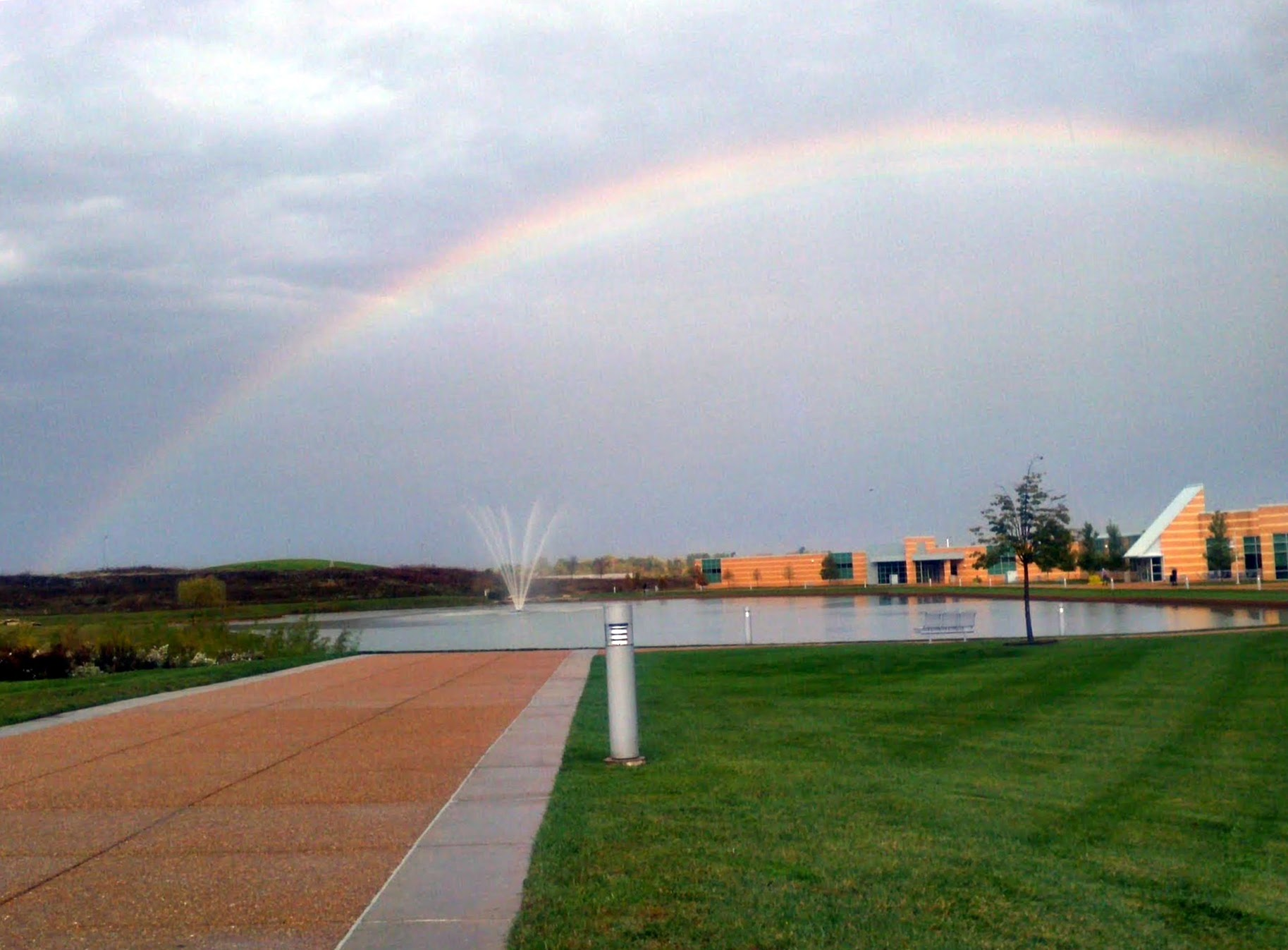
- Rainbow at St. Charles Community College in Cottleville, October 2011

- Location of Cottleville, Missouri
- Coordinates: 38°45′7″N 90°39′12″W
- Country: United States
- State: Missouri
- County: St. Charles

Area
  - Total: 4.74 sq mi (12.27 km^{2})
  - Land: 4.74 sq mi (12.27 km^{2})
  - Water: 0 sq mi (0.00 km^{2})
- Elevation: 466 ft (142 m)

Population (2020)
  - Total: 5,611
  - Density: 1,184.8/sq mi (457.47/km^{2})
- Time zone: UTC−6 (Central (CST))
  - Summer (DST): UTC−5 (CDT)
- FIPS code: 29-16678
- GNIS feature ID: 2393646
- Website: www.cityofcottleville.com

Cottleville is a city in St. Charles County, Missouri, United States. The population was 5,611 at the 2020 census.

== History ==
Cottleville is one of the oldest towns in St. Charles County. The town was first settled by Captain Warren G. Cottle in 1798 under a Spanish land grant. The area saw little development until 1810 when the John Pitman family arrived. Captain Cottle died in 1811, and his son, Dr. Warren G. Cottle Jr., inherited the farmlands. Dr. Cottle farmed extensively and occasionally practiced medicine. His son, Lorenzo, inherited 200 acres on both sides of the Dardenne River and, in 1839, parceled and named the town Cottleville after his father and grandfather. Before this, the village was known as Dardenne or Pin Hook. Early settlers included George Huffman (before 1803), Aaron Rutger (before 1809), Nathaniel Simons, and Nicholas Contz. A post office called Cottleville has been in operation since 1843. The town site was laid out in 1839.

It was named by Captain Lorenzo Cottle, an early settler and a veteran of the Black Hawk War and Seminole Wars.

== Schools ==
Cottleville is home to Francis Howell Central High School, Louis C. Saeger Middle School and Warren Elementary School. St. Joseph Catholic School is also located in Cottleville, providing classes for grades K-8; St. Joseph Catholic Church is the largest church by number of parishioners in the Roman Catholic Archdiocese of St. Louis. St. Charles Community College is also located within the town's limits.

== Geography ==
According to the United States Census Bureau, the city has a total area of 4.46 square miles (11.55 km^{2}), all land.

== Demographics ==
Historical population
Census	Pop.	Note	%±
1880	225		—
1970	230		—
1980	184		−20.0%
1990	2,936		1,495.7%
2000	1,928		−34.3%
2010	3,075		59.5%
2020	5,611		82.5%
U.S. Decennial Census

=== 2020 census ===
As of the 2020 census, Cottleville had a population of 5,611. The median age was 37.2 years. 25.3% of residents were under the age of 18 and 11.2% of residents were 65 years of age or older. For every 100 females there were 98.5 males, and for every 100 females age 18 and over there were 94.1 males age 18 and over.

100.0% of residents lived in urban areas, while 0.0% lived in rural areas.

There were 2,048 households in Cottleville, of which 38.1% had children under the age of 18 living in them. Of all households, 62.5% were married-couple households, 12.0% were households with a male householder and no spouse or partner present, and 19.7% were households with a female householder and no spouse or partner present. About 19.5% of all households were made up of individuals and 5.4% had someone living alone who was 65 years of age or older.

There were 2,120 housing units, of which 3.4% were vacant. The homeowner vacancy rate was 1.2% and the rental vacancy rate was 6.3%.

Racial composition as of the 2020 census
Race	Number	Percent
White	4,733	84.4%
Black or African American	251	4.5%
American Indian and Alaska Native	11	0.2%
Asian	243	4.3%
Native Hawaiian and Other Pacific Islander	2	0.0%
Some other race	68	1.2%
Two or more races	303	5.4%
Hispanic or Latino (of any race)	163	2.9%

=== 2010 census ===
As of the census of 2010, there were 3,075 people, 1,020 households, and 847 families living in the city. The population density was 689.5 inhabitants per square mile (266.2/km^{2}). There were 1,145 housing units at an average density of 256.7 per square mile (99.1/km^{2}). The racial makeup of the city was 92.7% White, 3.7% African American, 0.2% Native American, 1.5% Asian, 0.5% from other races, and 1.4% from two or more races. Hispanic or Latino of any race were 1.8% of the population.

There were 1,020 households, of which 45.5% had children under the age of 18 living with them, 71.3% were married couples living together, 8.0% had a female householder with no husband present, 3.7% had a male householder with no wife present, and 17.0% were non-families. 13.3% of all households were made up of individuals, and 3.6% had someone living alone who was 65 years of age or older. The average household size was 3.01 and the average family size was 3.31.

The median age in the city was 38.2 years. 29.4% of residents were under the age of 18; 7.3% were between the ages of 18 and 24; 25.1% were from 25 to 44; 30.3% were from 45 to 64; and 7.8% were 65 years of age or older. The gender makeup of the city was 50.0% male and 50.0% female.

=== 2000 census ===
As of the census of 2000, there were 1,928 people, 600 households, and 526 families living in the city. The population density was 493.7 inhabitants per square mile (190.6/km^{2}). There were 616 housing units at an average density of 157.7 per square mile (60.9/km^{2}). The racial makeup of the city was 96.27% White, 1.97% African American, 0.57% Asian, 0.26% from other races, and 0.93% from two or more races. Hispanic or Latino of any race were 0.88% of the population.

There were 600 households, out of which 56.0% had children under the age of 18 living with them, 79.3% were married couples living together, 5.7% had a female householder with no husband present, and 12.2% were non-families. 8.2% of all households were made up of individuals, and 2.2% had someone living alone who was 65 years of age or older. The average household size was 3.20 and the average family size was 3.41.

In the city the age distribution of the population shows 35.2% under the age of 18, 5.4% from 18 to 24, 38.8% from 25 to 44, 17.1% from 45 to 64, and 3.5% who were 65 years of age or older. The median age was 31 years. For every 100 females there were 99.2 males. For every 100 females age 18 and over, there were 99.4 males.

The median income for a household in the city was $74,200, and the median income for a family was $78,017. Males had a median income of $48,714 versus $35,000 for females. The per capita income for the city was $26,729. About 1.5% of families and 1.7% of the population were below the poverty line, including 3.0% of those under age 18 and none of those age 65 or over.

== Education ==
The majority of Cottleville is in the Francis Howell R-III School District. A small portion is in the Fort Zumwalt R-II School District.
