= Parks in Greater St. Louis =

Parks in Greater St. Louis are administered by a variety of state, county, and municipal authorities. The region also is home to Gateway Arch National Park, site of the Gateway Arch, the only National Memorial in the state of Missouri. Among the largest municipal parks is Forest Park, which is 1,293 acres (5.2 km^{2}) and is located in the city of St. Louis, although both Greensfelder County Park and Creve Coeur Park in St. Louis County are larger, at 1,646 and 2,114 acres (6.7 and 8.6 km^{2}) respectively. St. Louis County is also the location of two large state parks, Babler State Park with 3.8 square miles (9.8 km^{2}) and Castlewood State Park with 2.8 square miles (7.3 km^{2}). The largest state park in the region is Meramec State Park, located near Sullivan, Missouri, with 10.8 square miles (28 km^{2}) of parkland.

== Parks in the city of St. Louis ==
The city of St. Louis owns and maintains more than one hundred parks, ranging in size from the 1,371 acres (5.5 km^{2}) of Forest Park to less the than 1-acre (4,000 m^{2}) of Aboussie Park. Parks are administered by the city of St. Louis Department of Parks, Recreation and Forestry, the National Park Service, or a separate private board, such as Tower Grove Park, which is maintained by a Board of Commissioners but remains city property. Compton Hill Reservoir Park is owned by the city but maintained by the St. Louis Water Division.

Parks owned by the city of St. Louis
| North City | Created † | Central Corridor | Created † | South City | Created † |
| Amherst Park | 1970 | Aloe Plaza | 1931 | Aboussie Park | 1981 |
| Barrett Brothers Park | 1947 | Aloe Plaza West | 1969 | Alaska Park | 1995 |
| Beckett Playground | 1959 | Citygarden ‡‡ | 2009 | Amberg Park | 1963 |
| Busche Park | 1913 | Forest Park | 1876 | Bellerive Park | 1908 |
| Chambers Park | 1966 | Franz Park | 1915 | Benton Park | 1866 |
| Columbus Square Park | 1980 | Gateway Mall Plaza | 1970 | Berra Park | 1945 |
| DeSoto Park | 1908 | Greg Freeman Park | 1980 | Buder Playground | 1912 |
| Dickman Park | 1938 | Kaufmann Park | 1932 | Carnegie Park | 1899 |
| Eugene "Tink" Bradley Park | 1958 | Kiener Plaza | 1962 | Carondelet Lions Park | 1929 |
| Fairground Park | 1908 | Kingsbury Square Park | 1980 | Carondelet Park | 1929 |
| Father Filipiak Park | 1980 | Lucas Gardens Park | 1857 | Cherokee Park | 1924 |
| Fountain Park | 1889 | Memorial Plaza | 1932 | Chouteau Park | 2008 |
| Fourteenth Street Mall | 1976 | Phillip Lucier Park | 1980 | Christy Park | 1910 |
| Frank Williamson Sr. Park (Parkland Park) | 1968 | Poelker Park | 1986 | Clifton Heights Park | 1912 |
| Gregory J. Carter Park | 1951 | Samuel Kennedy Park | 2007 | Compton Hill Reservoir Park ‡ | 1867 |
| Gwen Giles Park | 1959 | Serra Sculpture Park | 1981 | Eads Square Park | 1979 |
| Hamilton Heights Park | 2002 | Taylor Park | 2008 | Fanetti Plaza | 1979 |
| Hickey Park | 1947 | Washington Square Park | 1840 | Fox Park | 1917 |
| Hyde Park | 1947 | | | Francis Park | 1916 |
| Ivory Perry Park | 1961 | | | Francis R Slay Park | 1926 |
| Jackson Place Park | 1816 | | | Fremont Park | 1963 |
| Jet Banks Park | 1963 | | | Gravois Park | 1812 |
| Loretta Hall Park | 1842 | | | Joe Leisure Park | 2000 |
| Marie Fowler Park | 1981 | | | Laclede Park | 1812 |
| Murphy Park | 1962 | | | Lafayette Park | 1838 |
| Norman Seay Park | 1936 | | | Lindenwood Park | 1947 |
| North Riverfront Park ‡ | 1980 | | | Lyon Park | 1868 |
| O'Fallon Park | 1908 | | | Marquette Park | 1915 |
| Penrose Park | 1910 | | | McDonald Park | 1928 |
| Rumbold Park | 1945 | | | Mestres Park | 1937 |
| Russell Park | 1950 | | | Minnesota and Hill Park | 1924 |
| Ruth Porter Mall | 1975 | | | Minnie Wood Memorial Square | 1925 |
| Sherman Park | 1917 | | | Mount Pleasant Park | 1812 |
| St. Louis Place Park | 1850 | | | Pontiac Square Park | 1908 |
| Strodtman Park | 1924 | | | Ray Leisure Park | 1958 |
| Tandy Park | 1918 | | | River Des Peres Extension | 1954 |
| Turner Playground | 1937 | | | River Des Peres Park | 1926 |
| Unity Park | 2004 | | | Sister Marie Charles Park | 1982 |
| Vivian Astra Park | 1921 | | | Soulard Market Park | 1908 |
| W. C. Handy Park | 1941 | | | St. Louis Square Park | 1882 |
| Walnut Park | 1974 | | | St. Marcus Commemorative Park | 1977 |
| Windsor Park | 1947 | | | Sublette Park | 1915 |
| Yeatman Square Park | 1906 | | | Terry Park | 1945 |
| † Dates based on city ordinance date establishing park.; ‡ Parks owned by the city and maintained by the St. Louis Water Division.; ‡‡ Citygarden is owned by the city and maintained by the Gateway Foundation.; ± Tower Grove Park is owned by the city and maintained by a Tower Grove Park Board of Commissioners. | | | | Tiffany Park | 1980 |
| † Dates based on city ordinance date establishing park.; ‡ Parks owned by the city and maintained by the St. Louis Water Division.; ‡‡ Citygarden is owned by the city and maintained by the Gateway Foundation.; ± Tower Grove Park is owned by the city and maintained by a Tower Grove Park Board of Commissioners. | | | | Tilles Park | 1957 |
| † Dates based on city ordinance date establishing park.; ‡ Parks owned by the city and maintained by the St. Louis Water Division.; ‡‡ Citygarden is owned by the city and maintained by the Gateway Foundation.; ± Tower Grove Park is owned by the city and maintained by a Tower Grove Park Board of Commissioners. | | | | Tower Grove Park ± | 1868 |
| † Dates based on city ordinance date establishing park.; ‡ Parks owned by the city and maintained by the St. Louis Water Division.; ‡‡ Citygarden is owned by the city and maintained by the Gateway Foundation.; ± Tower Grove Park is owned by the city and maintained by a Tower Grove Park Board of Commissioners. | | | | Willmore Park | 1947 |

=== Non-municipally owned parks ===
The city of St. Louis is also home to several public parks that are owned by other entities. Among these is Baer Plaza, owned and maintained by CVC/Sports Authority, Gateway Arch National Park, owned and maintained by the National Park Service, Kiel Triangle Park, owned by the Bi-State Development Agency, and Luther Ely Smith Park, owned and maintained by the National Park Service.

== Parks in St. Louis County ==
St. Louis County owns and maintains more than forty parks, including playgrounds and nature preserves. It also operates several recreation centers, the National Museum of Transportation, and the Affton Community Center. In addition to parks owned by St. Louis County, several municipalities in the county also own and maintain their own park systems.

Parks Owned by St. Louis County
| Name | Area (acres) | Region of St. Louis County† |
|---|---|---|
| Bee Tree Park | 199 | South |
| Bella Fontaine Park | 300 | North |
| Bissell House | 9.3 | North |
| Black Forest Park | 4.3 | South |
| Bohrer Park | 16 | South |
| Bon Oak Park | 15 | North |
| Buder Park | 75 | South |
| Castlepoint Park | 11 | North |
| Cliff Cave Park | 560 | South |
| Clydesdale Park | 117 | South |
| Creve Coeur Park | 2,114 | West |
| Ebsworth Park | 10.5 | West |
| Endicott Park | 24 | North |
| Faust Park | 197 | West |
| Endicott Park | 24 | North |
| Fort Bellefontaine Park | 305.6 | North |
| Greensfelder County Park | 1,646 | West |
| Jefferson Barracks Park | 426 | South |
| King Park | 4 | North |
| Kinloch Park | 9 | North |
| Laumeier Sculpture Park | 105 | South |
| Larimore Park | 22 | North |
| Lemay Park | 18.5 | South |
| Lone Elk County Park | 546 | West |
| Love Park | 89 | West |
| Mathilda-Welmering Park | 6 | South |
| McDonnell Park | 133 | North |
| Memorial Park | 2.7 | North |
| Ohlendorf Park | 10 | South |
| Queeny Park | 564 | West |
| Sioux Passage Park | 188 | North |
| Simpson Park | 206 | South |
| Spanish Lake Park | 245 | North |
| Stacy Park | 35 | West |
| St. Vincent Park | 133 | North |
| Suson Park | 98 | South |
| Sylvan Springs Park | 70 | South |
| Tilles Park | 75 | West |
| Unger Park | 140 | South |
| Veterans Memorial Park | 250 | North |
| West Tyson County Park | 670 | West |
| Winter Park | 160 | South |
† Regions of St. Louis County as defined by the St. Louis County Parks and Recreation Department.

Municipal Parks in St. Louis County
| Municipality | Name | Area (acres) | Amenities | Address |
|---|---|---|---|---|
| Ballwin | Ballwin Golf Course & Events Center | | 9-hole golf course; practice cage; practice green; pro shop; snack and drink bar | 333 Holloway Road, Ballwin, MO 63011 |
| Ballwin | Ferris Park | 12 | community garden; drinking fountains; fishing; natural play area; pavilion; playground; restrooms; sand volleyball; site furnishings (benches, trash receptacle); trails; water play area | 500 New Ballwin Road, Ballwin, MO 63011 |
| Ballwin | Greenfield Commons | | | 1 Ballwin Commons Circle, Ballwin, MO 63021 |
| Ballwin | Holloway Park | 2.6 | Drinking fountains; pavilion; pickleball (paved court); playground; site furnishings (benches, trash receptacle); tennis (paved court); | 335 Holloway Road, Ballwin, MO 63011 |
| Ballwin | New Ballwin Park | 7 | basketball (paved court); drinking fountains; pavilion; playground; restrooms; site furnishings (benches, trash receptacle); tennis (paved court); trails; | 329 New Ballwin Road, Ballwin, MO 63011 |
| Ballwin | North Pointe Aquatic Center | | Competition pool; kiddie pool; lazy river; leisure pool; splash pad; swimming lessons; water slides | 335 Holloway Road, Ballwin, MO 63011 |
| Ballwin | The Pointe at Ballwin Commons | 12.8 | Cardio equipment; child care; drinking fountains; gym; indoor pool; meeting rooms; pavilion; personal training; pickleball; running track; sand play area; site furnishings (benches, trash receptacle); swimming lessons; trails; weights | 1 Ballwin Commons Circle, Ballwin, MO 63021 |
| Ballwin | Vlasis Park | 31 | baseball field; drinking fountains; fishing; pavilion; playground; restrooms; sand volleyball; site furnishings (benches, trash receptacle); soccer field; tennis (paved court); trails; water play area | 300 Park Drive, Ballwin, MO 63011 |
| Clayton | Anderson Park | 4.56 | Dog park; picnic tables | 8275 Clayton Road, Clayton, MO 63105 |
| Clayton | Center of Clayton | 3.12 | Classrooms; climbing wall; dance studios (2), free weights and weight machines; gyms (4); jogging track; lounge; meeting rooms; Subway restaurant; swimming pools. | 50 Gay Avenue, Clayton, MO 63105 |
| Clayton | Clayshire Park | 0.125 | | 623 Francis Place, Clayton, MO 63105 |
| Clayton | Concordia Park | 1.5 | Picnic tables | 801 DeMun Avenue, Clayton, MO 63105 |
| Clayton | DeMun Park | 0.5 | Little library; picnic tables; playgrounds (2); restroom | 810 DeMun Avenue. Clayton, MO 63105 |
| Clayton | Hanley Park | 1 | Historic Hanley House, little library, picnic tables, restroom, walking path | 7600 Westmoreland Avenue, Clayton, MO 63105 |
| Clayton | Henry Wright Park | 0.125 | | 6424 Alamo Avenue, Clayton, MO 63105 |
| Clayton | Oak Knoll Park | 14.5 | Picnic tables; playground; rentable picnic pad; restroom; walking path | 1 Oak Knoll Park, Clayton, MO 63105 |
| Clayton | Remembrance Park | 0.06 | Picnic tables | 7811 Maryland Avenue, Clayton, MO 63105 |
| Clayton | Shaw Park | 47.47 | Baseball fields, Centennial Greenway connection, ice skating rink, picnic tables, playground, rentable picnic pavilions/pads, restrooms, sand volleyball courts, swimming pools, tennis courts. walking path | 27 S. Brentwood Boulevard, Clayton, MO 63105 |
| Clayton | Taylor Park | 1 | Picnic tables, playground | 222 N. Central Avenue, Clayton, MO 63105 |
| Clayton | Whitburn Park | 0.125 | Picnic tables | 8114 Whitburn Drive, Clayton, MO 63105 |
| Clayton | Wydown Park | 0.5 | Little library; picnic tables | 7619 Wydown Boulevard, Clayton, MO 63105 |
| University City | Ackert Walkway | | 0.34 mile walkway | Bounded by Delmar Boulevard and Vernon Avenue, University City, MO 63130 |
| University City | Ackert Park | 3.8 | Playground; splash playground; walking path | 765 Westgate Avenue/764 Leland Avenue, University City, MO 63130 |
| University City | Joseph L. Adams Park | 1.6 | Undeveloped | 7000 Northmoor Drive, University City, MO 63130 |
| University City | Eastgate Park | 0.93 | Basketball courts; playground | 848 Eastgate Avenue, University City, MO 63130 |
| University City | Flynn Park | 6.61 | Pickleball courts; playground; tennis courts | 420 Midvale Avenue, University City, MO 63130 |
| University City | Fogerty Park | 11.81 | Children’s playground; full-size baseball diamond; jogging trail (0.5 miles); picnic area; recycling; splash pad; weatherproof shelter with restrooms; youth soccer field | 1540 North 82nd Boulevard, University City, MO 63130 |
| University City | Greensfelder Park | 6.75 | Undeveloped | 8301 Kempland Place, University City, MO 63130 |
| University City | Greenway South | 1.83 | Linear park | South from 6600 Kingsbury Boulevard to Forest Park Parkway, University City, MO 63130 |
| University City | Heman Park | 85.26 | Baseball diamonds (1 large, 5 Little League); basketball courts; Centennial Commons indoor sports facility (artificial turf soccer field, cardio machines, gyms [2], meeting rooms [3], running track, free weights and weight machines) community center; football/soccer fields; horseshoe courts; jogging course (1.5 miles); picnic areas; picnic pavilions (4); playground; recycling; softball diamonds (5); splash pad; swimming pool; tee ball diamond; tennis courts (8, with 4 lighted) | 7200 Olive Street, University City, MO 63130 |
| University City | Kaufman Park | 7.77 | Playground; Tot Lot play area for smaller children; tennis and pickleball courts (4) with a tennis practice area, natural wooded area suitable for nature study | 8025 Blackberry Place, University City, MO 63130 |
| University City | Lewis Park | 4 | Playground; decorative pond with fountain; walking paths | 7001 Delmar Boulevard, University City, MO 63130 |
| University City | Janet Majerus Park | 5 | Children's playground; jogging trail (0.33 mile); fitness stations; decorative pond with fountain | 1300 Partridge Avenue, University City, MO 63130 |
| University City | Metcalfe Park | 5.6 | Ball fields (2); playground | 830 Kingsland Avenue, University City, MO 63130 |
| University City | Millar Park | 12.19 | Baseball diamonds (2); football and soccer fields; jogging trail with fitness station (0.5 miles); picnic pavilion with restrooms; playground | 7603 Carleton Avenue, University City, MO 63130 |
| University City | Mona Trail | 2 | 0.24 mile trail | 1100 Groby Road, University City, MO 63130 |
| University City | Mooney Park | 5.2 | Basketball court; playground | 5 Vanderbilt Avenue, University City, MO 63130 |
| University City | Rabe Park | 2 | Children's playground; open play field | 7369 Canton Avenue, University City, MO 63130 |
| University City | Ruth Park Woods | 23 | Wooded tract with interpretive nature trails | 1160 McKnight Road, University City, MO 63130 |
| University City | Ruth Park Golf Course | 70 | 9-hole golf course; driving range | 8211 Groby Road, University City, MO 63130 |
| University City | University City Dog Park | 1 | Dog park | 6860 Vernon Ave, University City, MO 63130 |
| University City | Shelley Welsch Park | 0.84 | Tot Lot play area for smaller children | 6651 Chamberlain Avenue, University City, MO 63130 |

== Parks in St. Charles County ==
Notable parks maintained by St. Charles County include Indian Camp Creek Park, Kinetic Park, Klondike Park, Quail Ridge Park, and Towne Park. The city of O'Fallon maintains Fort Zumwalt Park.

=== St. Charles County Blueways ===
The Dardenne Creek Blueway is the first in a planned series of kayaking and canoeing routes connecting St. Charles area parks and recreation facilities. The blueway's first 3.5-mile (5.6 km) stretch links Riverside Landing County Park on the Mississippi River to St. Peters' 370 Lakeside Park and takes up to two hours for a round trip. The next stage opened in the fall of 2022 and linked to St. Peters' Lone Wolff Park 5.2 miles (8.4 km) to the southwest. Three future phases will connect Jack Gettemeyer Park, O'Fallon Sports Park, and Bluebird Meadow Park for a total of 19 miles (30.6 km) of access along Dardenne Creek. A future route is the Big Creek Blueway, which will connect Indian Camp Creek and Flatwoods parks through Big Creek and the Cuivre River, or about 12.3 miles (19.8 km).

== State parks ==
Twelve Missouri state parks are in Greater St. Louis, and the Missouri Department of Natural Resources also operates several state historic sites in the region.

State parks in Greater St. Louis
| Name | Area (acres) |
|---|---|
| Babler State Park | 2,441 |
| Castlewood State Park | 1,819 |
| Don Robinson State Park | 818 |
| Hawn State Park | 4,956 |
| Jones-Confluence Point State Park | 1,121 |
| Katy Trail State Park (eastern end) | 3,543 (total) |
| Meramec State Park | 6,896 |
| Robertsville State Park | 1,225 |
| Route 66 State Park | 424 |
| St. Francois State Park | 2,735 |
| St. Joe State Park | 8,243 |
| Washington State Park | 2,158 |
