= Indian Camp Creek Park =

Public park in Foristell, Missouri

- Interactive map of Indian Camp Creek Park
- Location: 2679 Dietrich Road; Foristell, MO 63348
- Coordinates: 38.883°N 90.937°W
- Area: 603 acres (244 ha)
- Opened: 2006
- Operator: St. Charles County
- Website: https://www.sccmo.org/665/Indian-Camp-Creek-Park

Indian Camp Creek Park is a public park in Foristell, Missouri. It is located in the northwestern part of St. Charles County and is operated by the St. Charles County Parks Department. It is the county's largest park at 603 acres (244 ha).

The park opened in 2006, five years after the bulk of its land was donated. It is named for Indian Camp Creek, which meets with Big Creek within the park. The parks department puts much focus on maintaining and emphasizing the environmental heritage of the area.

== Amenities ==
The park features about ten miles (16 km) of trails, paved and unpaved, for walking, cycling, horseback riding, and inline skating.

Other amenities include an eco-playground, a former silo turned into an observation tower, a nature preserve, camping grounds, a six-acre (2.4 ha) fishing pond, and an 18-hole disc golf course.

The remains of a log cabin and the Cannon family cemetery, both from the 1800s, are preserved in the park.

== See also ==
- Towne Park – Public park in Foristell, Missouri
- Daniel Boone Home – Historic house in Missouri, United States
