= Quail Ridge Park =

Public park in Wentzville, Missouri

- Interactive map of Quail Ridge Park
- Location: 560 Interstate Drive; Wentzville, MO 63385
- Coordinates: 38°48′00″N 90°50′20″W
- Area: 250 acres (100 ha)
- Authorized: 2000
- Operator: St. Charles County
- Website: https://www.sccmo.org/716/Quail-Ridge-Park

Quail Ridge Park is a public park in Wentzville, Missouri. It is operated by the St. Charles County Parks Department.

== Park development ==
Half of the park's land was donated and half of it was sold to St. Charles County by Henry L. Stealey, a farmer, in 1998. The St. Louis chapter of the American Society of Landscape Architects donated their services to its planning. The park opened in 2000. It has a three-acre fishing lake and seven miles of trails and paved surfaces.

The park is approximately 250 acres and has various amenities, including a 4,440 square foot hall, Quail Ridge Lodge, that is rented out for weddings and events. Its 2.5 dog park, which opened in 2003, was the first off-leash dog park in St. Charles County.

The park is home to the Quail Ridge Horseshoe Club and the National Horseshoe Pitchers Hall of Fame and Museum. The Hall of Fame and Museum moved to the park from its previous home in Joelton, Tennessee, in 2006. It has exhibits relating to the history of the game as well as 32 indoor and outdoor horseshoe pitching courts.

== See also ==
- Towne Park, a county park and former plantation in Foristell, Missouri
- Indian Camp Creek Park, a county park located in Foristell, Missouri
- Daniel Boone Home, an assembled historic village in Defiance, Missouri, operated by the St. Charles County Parks Department
