= Dardenne =

Dardenne may refer to:

- Ardennes-Verdun dynasty, or Maison Dardenne
- Dardenne brothers, Belgian film directors
- Sabine Dardenne, Belgian author
- Jay Dardenne, lawyer and politician from Baton Rouge, Louisiana
- Guy Dardenne, Belgian footballer
- Dardenne Prairie, Missouri
- Dardenne Township, St. Charles County, Missouri
