= Big Creek (Cuivre River tributary) =

Stream in the American state of Missouri

Location
- Country: United States
- State: Missouri
- Region: Lincoln, St. Charles and Warren counties

Physical characteristics
- Source
  - coordinates: 38°47′34″N 91°09′06″W
  - elevation: 890 ft (270 m)
- Mouth
  - coordinates: 38°52′44″N 90°49′38″W
  - elevation: 433 ft (132 m)

Basin features
- Tributaries
  - left: Schlanker Branch, Yeater Branch, Dry Creek, Coon Creek
  - right: Hickory Lick Creek, Indian Camp Creek, McCoy Creek

Big Creek is a stream in Lincoln, St. Charles and Warren counties of the U.S. state of Missouri. It is a tributary of the Cuivre River.

The source area for the stream lies just southwest of Warrenton in Warren County. The stream flows north passing under Interstate 70 and turns east passing under Missouri Route 47 before entering Lincoln county. The stream meanders east and becomes the boundary between Lincoln and St. Charles counties. It passes under US Route 61 and enters the Cuivre to the north of Wentzville, and the communities of Flint Hill and Enon.

An early variant name was "Eagle Fork". According to tradition, the former name was applied because eagles often attacked an early settler's hogs.

== See also ==
- List of rivers of Missouri
