= Memorial Plaza =

Memorial Plaza may refer to:

- National September 11 Memorial & Museum, World Trade Center, New York City, commonly referred to as Memorial Plaza
- Memorial Plaza (St. Louis, Missouri)
