= Enon, St. Charles County, Missouri =

Unincorporated community in Missouri, U.S.

Enon, Missouri
- Unincorporated community
- Location in Missouri
- Coordinates: 38°51′47″N 90°49′52″W
- Country: United States
- State: Missouri
- County: St. Charles
- Time zone: UTC-6 (Central (CST))
  - Summer (DST): UTC-5 (CDT)

Enon is an unincorporated community in northwest St. Charles County, in the U.S. state of Missouri.

The community is located approximately three miles north of Wentzville and 1.5 miles east of Flint Hill on Missouri Route P and adjacent to Enon Branch, a tributary of McCoy Creek.

== History ==
The community was named after Ænon, a place mentioned in the New Testament. A variant name was "Hoeberville". A post office called Hoeberville was established in 1879, and remained in operation until 1914.
