= Tyson Research Center =

General information
- Classification: Biological Field Research Area
- Location: West St. Louis County
- Coordinates: 38°31′N 90°33′W
- Named for: The Tyson Valley
- Inaugurated: Acquired in 1963
- Owner: Washington University in St. Louis

Website
- https://tyson.wustl.edu/

Tyson Research Center is a 2,000-acre (8.1 km^{2}) environmental field station owned and operated by Washington University in St. Louis, situated along a broad curve of the Meramec River, across from Castlewood State Park. Washington University obtained Tyson after it had been used by the U.S. Military for ordnance storage in 1963. It is part of the Henry Shaw Ozark Corridor which consists of over 8,000 acres (32 km^{2}) of protected lands. It is a member of the Organization of Biological Field Stations (OBFS). In 2010, its Living Learning Center became one of the first two buildings in the United States accredited as a "living building" under the Living Building Challenge.

Tyson provides opportunities for environmental research and education for students and faculty from Washington University and beyond. Infrastructure and programs facilitate multi-scale research and teaching opportunities and collaboration across disciplines, institutions, and levels of academic training.

Tyson Research Center was originally part of the Tyson Valley Powder Plant in World War II. It is bordered to the east by Lone Elk County Park, to the west by West Tyson County Park, to the north by Castlewood State Park, and to the south by Interstate 44.

Tyson Research Center hosts the Endangered Wolf Center.

Tyson also has a weather station and monitors acid rain as part of the National Atmospheric Deposition Program.

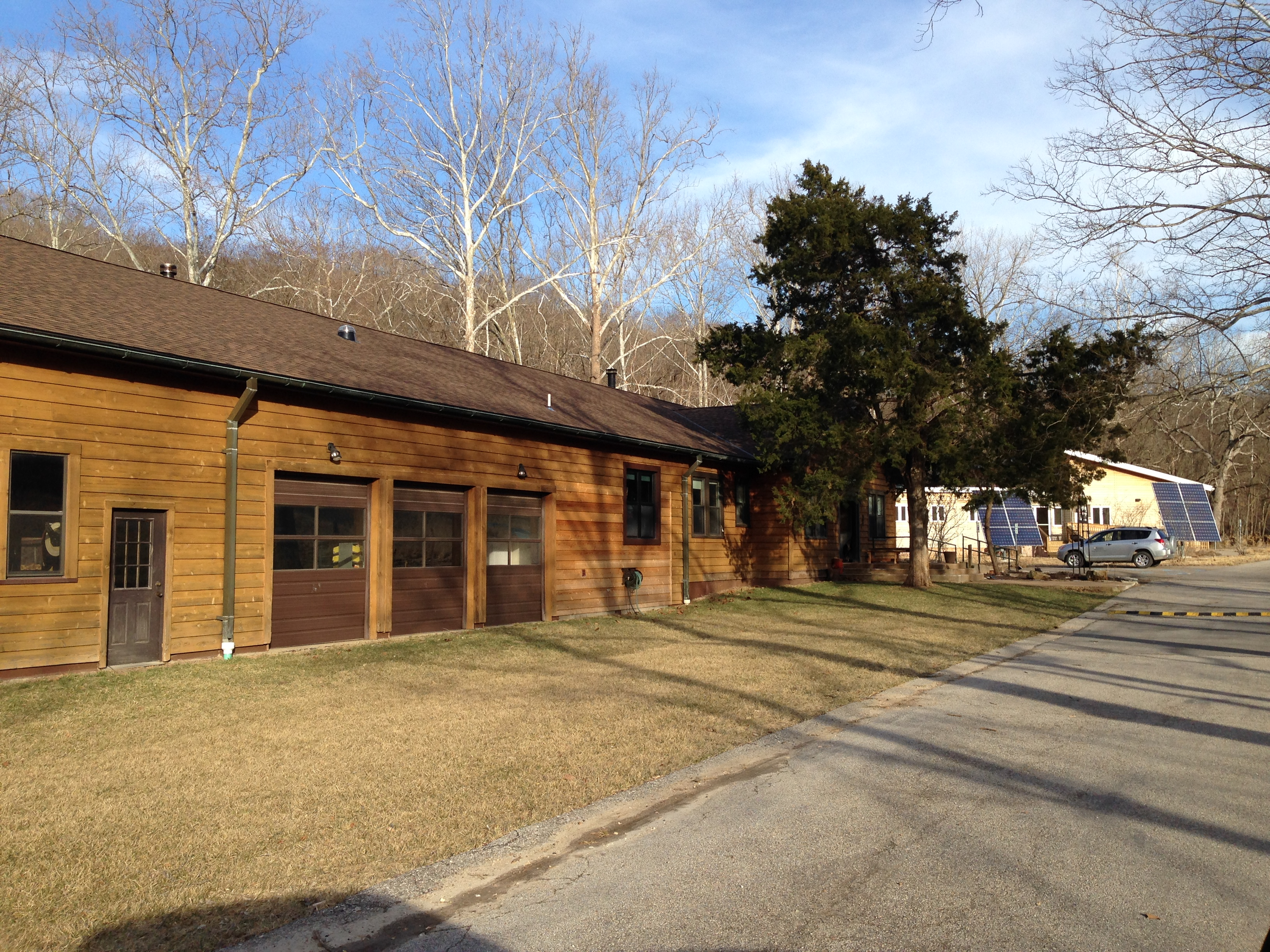
Headquarters building

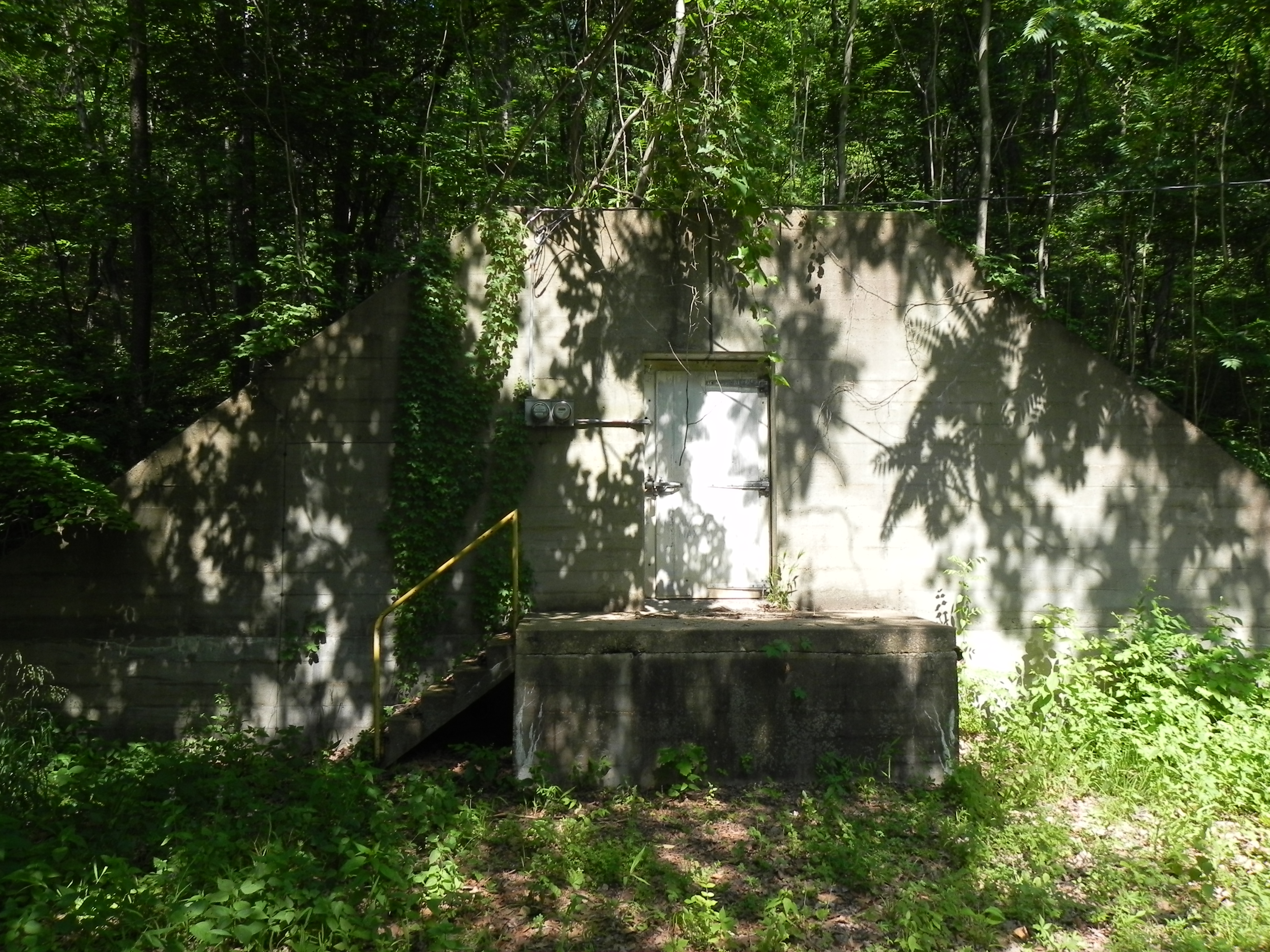
A bunker at Tyson

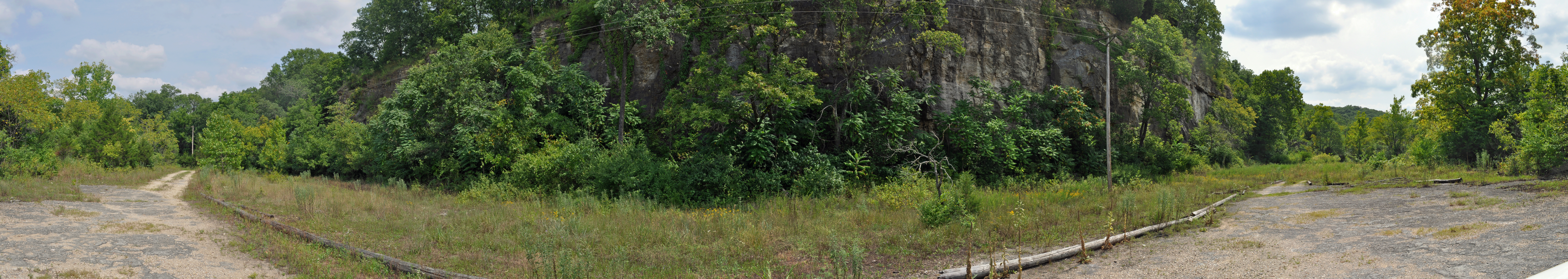
Minke Quarry site

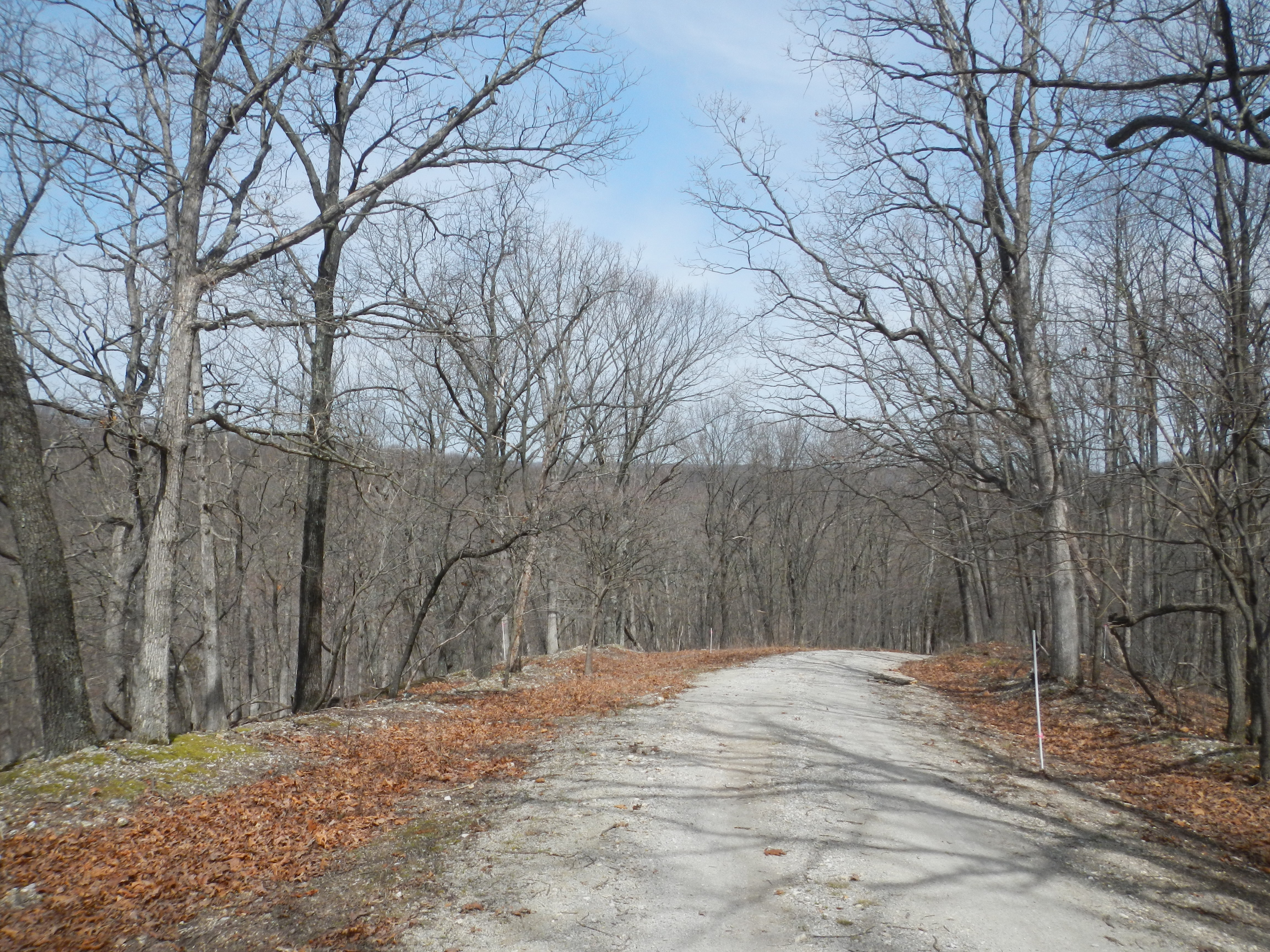

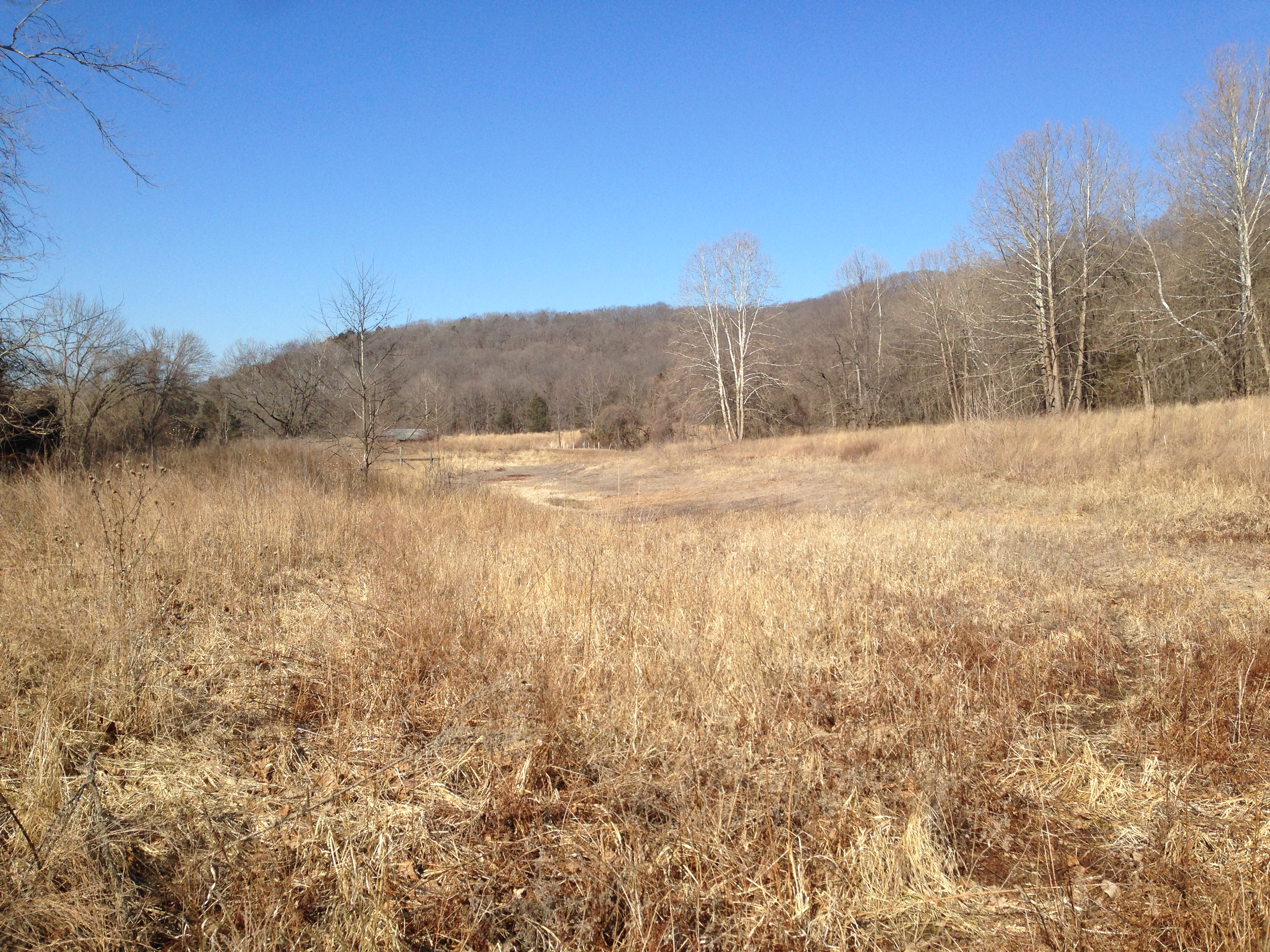
