= Coon Creek (Big Creek tributary) =

Stream in the US state of Missouri

Coon Creek is a stream in Lincoln and Warren counties in the U.S. state of Missouri. It is a tributary of Big Creek.

The stream headwaters are at 38°54′52″N 91°10′47″W and its confluence with Big Creek is at 38°54′25″N 91°00′31″W.

Coon Creek was named for the abundance of raccoons in the area.

== See also ==
- List of rivers of Missouri
