= Yeater Branch =

Stream in the US state of Missouri

Yeater Branch is a stream in Warren County in the U.S. state of Missouri. It is a tributary of Big Creek.

The stream headwaters arise along the north side of I-70 and one mile northeast of the community of Pendleton at 38°50′01″N 91°12′57″W and an elevation of 875 feet. The stream flows to the north for about three miles along and to the east of Missouri Route A then turns east for about 2.5 miles to its confluence with Big Creek one half mile west of Missouri Route 47 at 38°52′53″N 91°08′30″W and an elevation of 633 feet.

Yeater Branch has the name of Conrad Yeater, a pioneer citizen.

== See also ==
- List of rivers of Missouri
