= St. Louis Place =

Neighborhood of St. Louis in Missouri, US

Coordinates: 38.6501°N 90.2059°W

- Neighborhood of St. Louis
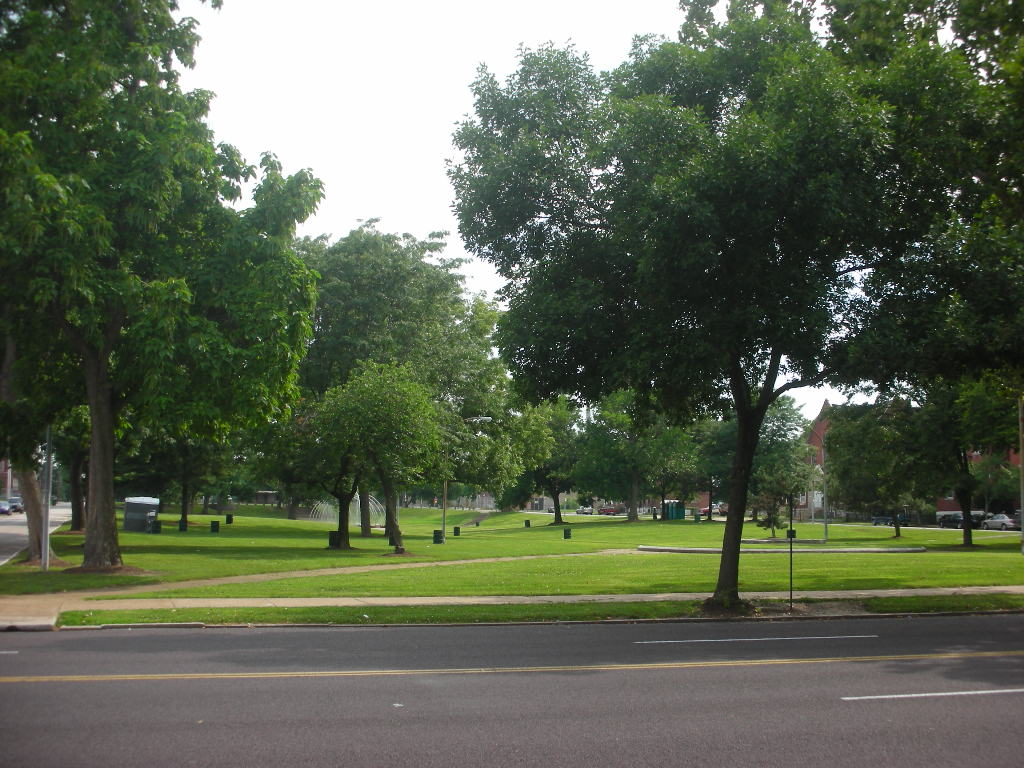
- Looking south on St. Louis Ave into St. Louis Place Park

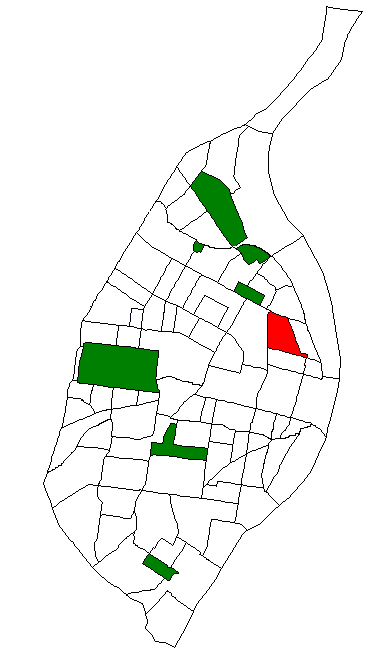
- Location (red) of St. Louis Place within St. Louis
- Country: United States
- State: Missouri
- City: St. Louis
- Wards: 14

Government
  - Aldermen: Rasheen Aldridge

Area
  - Total: 0.69 sq mi (1.8 km^{2})

Population (2020)
  - Total: 2,336
  - Density: 3,400/sq mi (1,300/km^{2})
- ZIP code(s): Parts of 63106, 63107
- Area code(s): 314
- Website: stlouis-mo.gov

St. Louis Place is a neighborhood of St. Louis, Missouri. It is bounded by Palm Street on the north, Cass Avenue on the south, North Florissant Avenue on the east, and Jefferson Avenue on the west.

== Demographics ==
Historical population
Census	Pop.	Note	%±
1990	3,799		—
2000	2,629		−30.8%
2010	2,939		11.8%
2020	2,336		−20.5%

In 2020 St. Louis Place's racial makeup was 89.8% Black, 6.3% White, 0.5% Native American, 0.2% Asian, 2.9% Two or More Races, and 0.4% some other race. 1.4% of the population was of Hispanic or Latino origin.

== Churches ==
Several churches, such as Zion Lutheran, have been active on the north side since the 1800s. Zion Lutheran Church was formed under the Soulard neighborhood's Trinity Lutheran Church in 1860. Its first sanctuary was at Blair and Warren. The second sanctuary of Zion Lutheran Church was completed in 1895. The architect was Albert Knell. The St. Louis Post-Dispatch predicted Zion Lutheran would be the most impressive church in North St. Louis. The construction of the church, which seated 1,280, led to positive changes in the neighborhood, such as sidewalks and a property value increase of 10% in an area that was formerly somewhat vacated. The cornerstone was laid in 1894 and the building was dedicated on December 22, 1895. The altar is made of Italian marble and onyx. Reverend Charles F. Obermeyer introduced English language services in 1897. Other services were given in German. By 1932, most services were in English with one German service each Sunday. A school was built across the street from the church in 1909. A bowling alley was added to the school in 1929. Notable former pastors of Zion Lutheran include Henry Sieck (1886-1889) and his son Louis J. Sieck (assistant pastor 1905; pastor 1914-1943).

== See also ==
- St. Louis Place Park
