= Hickory Lick Creek =

Stream in the American state of Missouri

Hickory Lick Creek is a stream in Lincoln and Warren counties in the U.S. state of Missouri. It is a tributary to Big Creek.

The stream headwaters are in Warrenton at 38°48′53″N 91°08′06″W and its confluence with Big Creek in Lincoln County is at 38°53′50″N 91°05′17″W.

Hickory Lick Creek's name is illustrative of its setting.

== See also ==
- List of rivers of Missouri
