= St. Theodore Catholic School =

Private school in Missouri, US

St. Theodore School

Location
- 5059 Highway P Wentzville, Missouri; United States; 38°51′19″N 90°51′52″W

Information
- Principal: Kelly Cassinger
- Website: St. Theodore school

St. Theodore Catholic School is a private Roman Catholic school in St. Charles County, Missouri, United States.

== History ==
St. Theodore was built in 1883 and named after Rev. Theodore Krainhardt. The original building was roughly 20 by 40 feet (6.1 m × 12.2 m) and would later be converted into a two-room school house with the addition of the church in 1900. The still-standing "old school" was built in 1913. It had 7 classrooms, two stories, a loft, a basement (used as a cafeteria), and two stairways. Two grades shared one classroom. Some classrooms were used as administrative offices throughout the years. Later, an elevator was added.

In 2000, the school was expanded, adding 6 classrooms, a cafeteria, a teacher's lounge, an administrator's office, and a large gym.

As of the 2011–2012 school year, about 215 students attend St. Theodore with a class size of 17–30.

== Works cited ==
- Abeln, Mark S (June 7, 2007). "Photos of St. Theodore Church in Flint Hill Missouri".
- Mittelbuscher, Barb E. "History of Flint Hill". City of Flint Hill.
