= Aboussie Park =

Municipal park in St. Louis, Missouri

Coordinates: 38.6019°N 90.2141°W

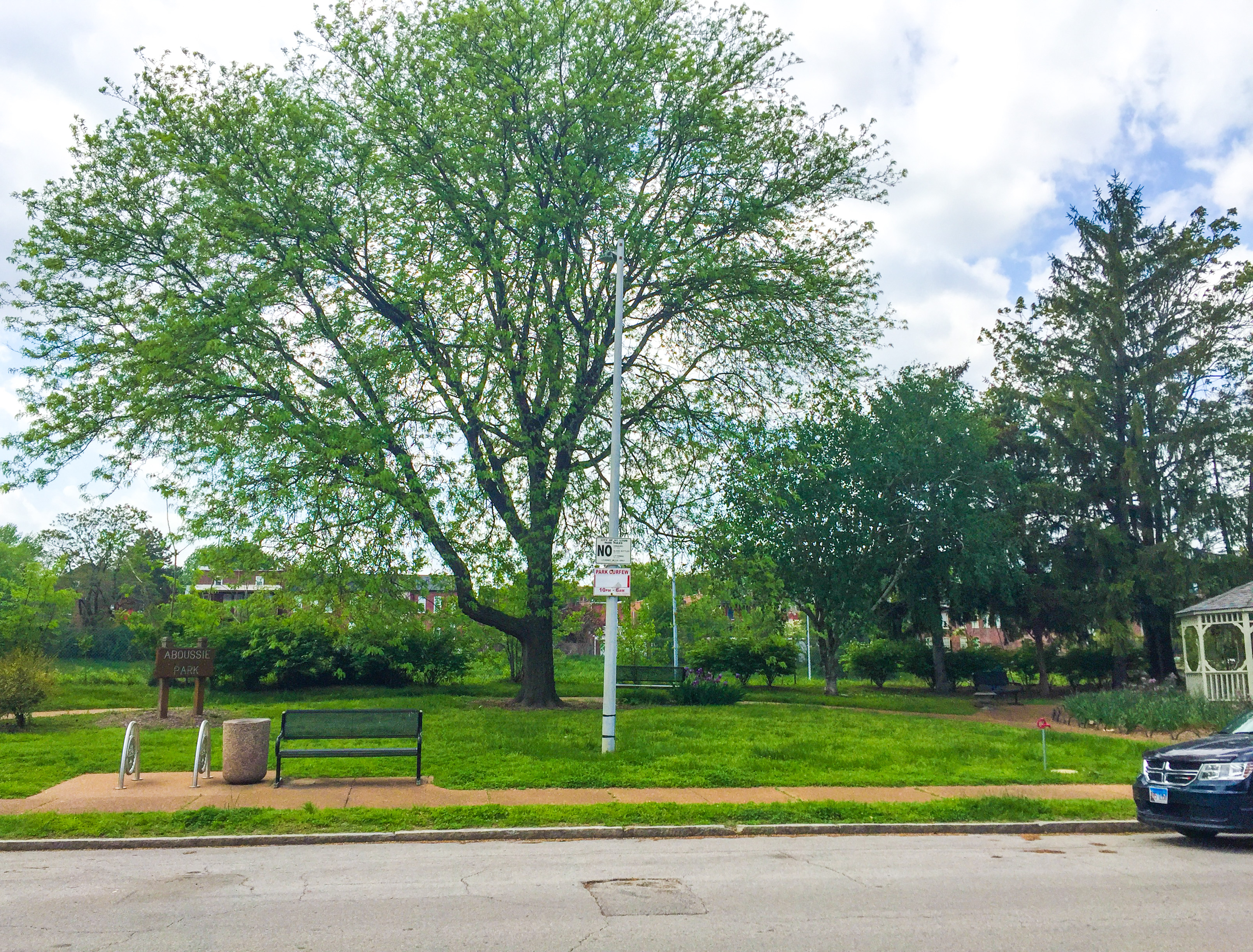
- Aboussie Park, May 2018
- Interactive map of Aboussie Park
- Type: Municipal (St. Louis Parks Department)
- Location: St. Louis
- Area: 0.40 acres (1,600 m^{2})
- Created: 1981
- Operator: St. Louis Parks Department
- Status: Open
- Public transit: MetroBus

Aboussie Park is a municipal park in St. Louis. It is the city's smallest park, with less than 1-acre (4,000 m^{2}). Aboussie Park was established in 1981.

== Geography ==
The park is located at 13th Street and Lynch Street in the neighborhood of Soulard. It is in a section of land adjoining the highway that was built through the neighborhood.

== See also ==
- People and culture of St. Louis, Missouri
- Neighborhoods of St. Louis
- Parks in St. Louis, Missouri
