= Dry Creek (Big Creek tributary) =

Stream in the US state of Missouri

Dry Creek is a stream in Lincoln and Warren counties of the U.S. state of Missouri. It is a tributary of Big Creek. A variant name was "Dry Branch".

The headwaters of the stream are at 38°54′29″N 91°10′24″W and the confluence with Big Creek is at 38°53′56″N 91°04′18″W.

Dry Creek was so named because it often is dry.

== See also ==
- List of rivers of Missouri
