= North Riverfront Park =

Municipal park in St. Louis, Missouri, US

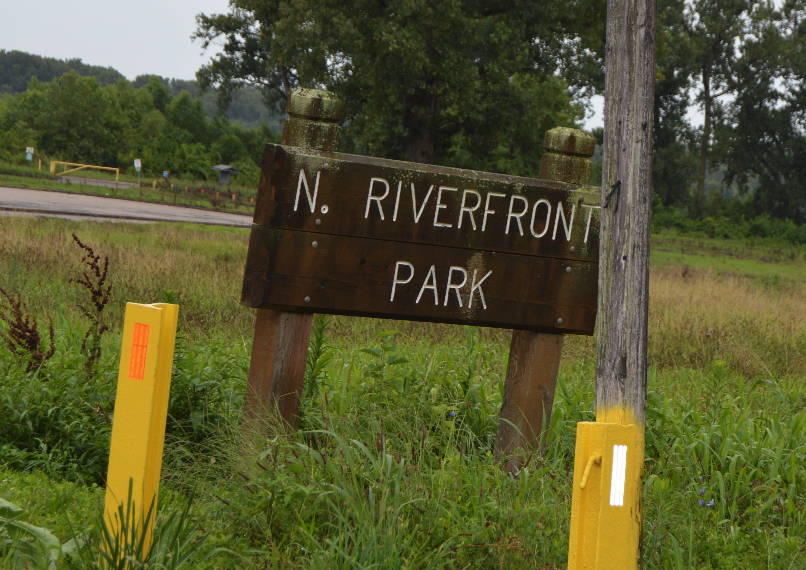
- Interactive map of North Riverfront Park
- Type: Municipal
- Location: St. Louis, Missouri, United States
- Coordinates: 38.742°N 90.201°W
- Area: 250 acres (100 ha)
- Created: 1980
- Operator: Water Division
- Status: Open

North Riverfront Park is a municipal park in St. Louis, Missouri.

== Description ==
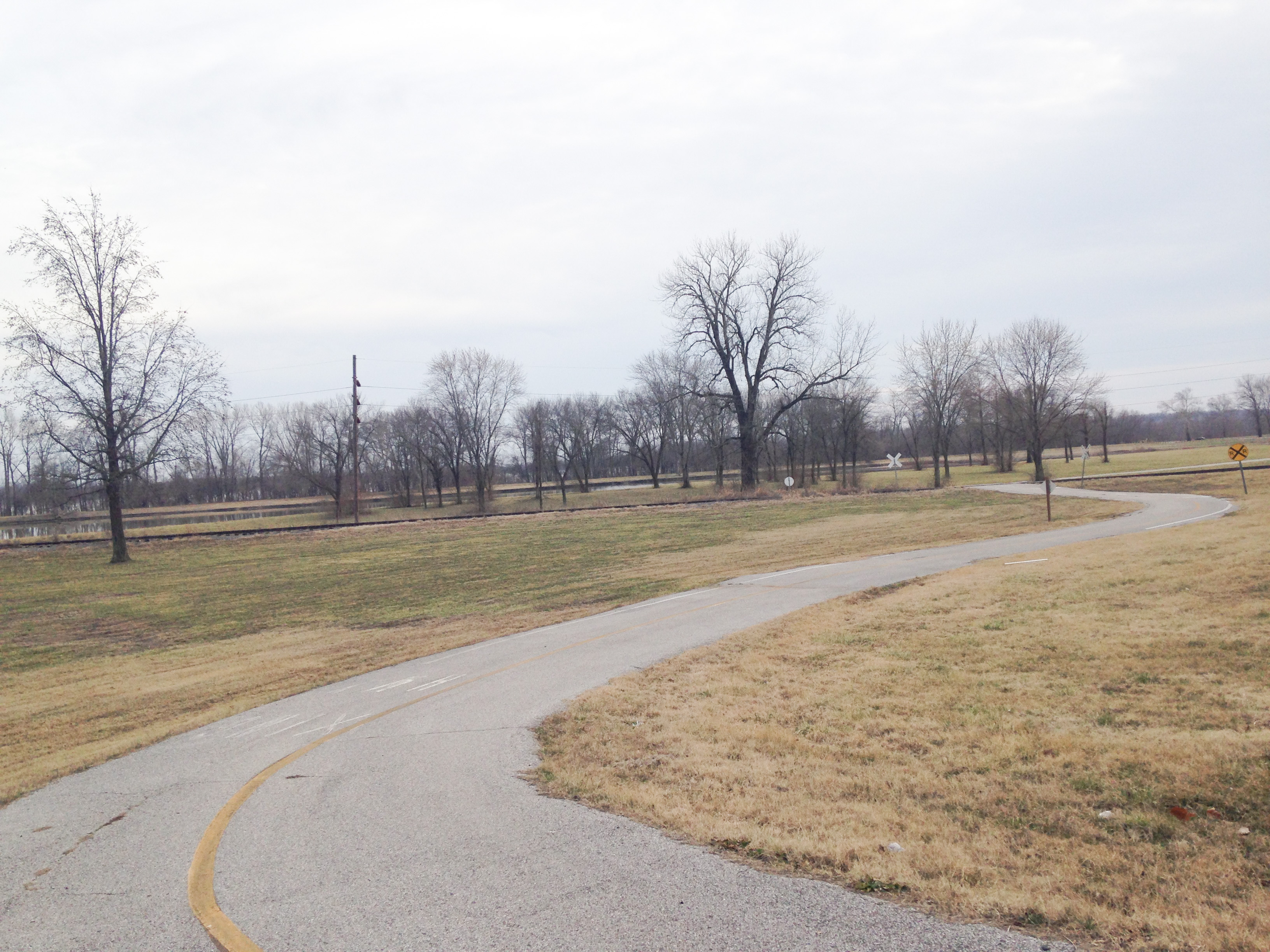
The paved bike/walking trail in North Riverfront Park

The park is the northernmost park in St. Louis. It contains a lake and a trail for biking/walking. In 2008, The Riverfront Times gave the lake the award for "Best Fishing Hole".

== Geography ==
North Riverfront is located on Riverview Dr. and Scranton. It is bordered by the Mississippi River to the east.

=== Surrounding areas ===
It is surrounded by the neighborhood of North Riverfront.

== See also ==
- People and culture of St. Louis, Missouri
- Neighborhoods of St. Louis
- Parks in St. Louis, Missouri
