= McCoy Creek (Missouri) =

Stream in Missouri, United States

Location
- Country: United States
- State: Missouri
- Region: St. Charles and Warren counties

Physical characteristics
- Source
  - coordinates: 38°49′55″N 90°58′18″W
  - elevation: 680 ft (210 m)
- Mouth
  - coordinates: 38°52′40″N 90°49′49″W
  - elevation: 436 ft (133 m)

Basin features
- Tributaries
  - right: Dry Branch, Enon Branch

McCoy Creek is a stream in St. Charles and Warren Counties in the U.S. state of Missouri. It is a tributary to Big Creek.

The stream headwaters arise in northeastern Warren County about two miles northwest of Foristell and Interstate 70. The stream flows to the northeast into St. Charles County crossing under Missouri Route W and US Route 61 northwest of the Flint Hill community. It enters Big Creek just upstream (east) of the confluence of Big Creek with the Cuivre River.

McCoy Creek has the name of Daniel and John McCoy, pioneer citizens.

== See also ==
- List of rivers of Missouri
