= Kraus House =

Historic house in Missouri, United States

- Russell and Ruth Goetz Kraus House
- U.S. National Register of Historic Places
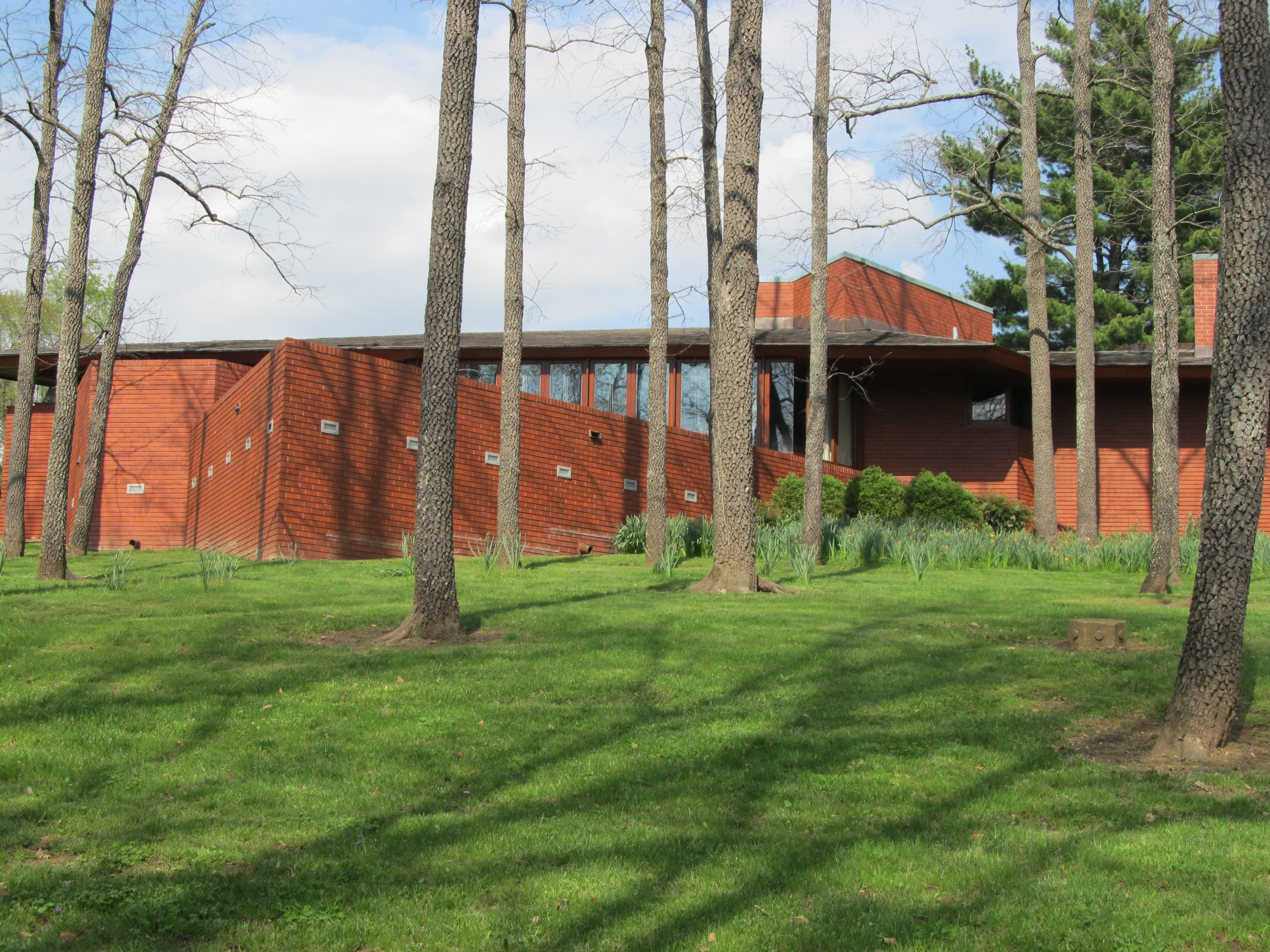

- Location within Missouri Location within the United States
- Location: 120 N. Ballas Road, Kirkwood, MO 63122
- Coordinates: 38°34′57.43″N 90°26′32.38″W
- Area: 10.45 acres (4.23 ha)
- Built: 1952
- Built by: Lee Patterson
- Architect: Frank Lloyd Wright
- Architectural style: Modern Movement, Usonian
- NRHP reference No.: 96001595
- Added to NRHP: January 31, 1997

The Kraus House, also known as the Frank Lloyd Wright House in Ebsworth Park, is a house in Kirkwood, Missouri designed by architect Frank Lloyd Wright. The brick and cypress house was designed and constructed for Russell and Ruth Goetz Kraus, and the initial design was conceived in 1950. Construction continued until at least 1960 and was never formally completed. The owners lived in the house for about 40 years (Ruth died in 1992).

The house features parallelograms; indeed, the only right angles to be found in the house are located in the bathroom. Even the bed is a parallelogram and sheets must be custom made. The house itself sits on a parallelogram blueprint. The house features a carport, attached shed, and a workroom for Kraus, a glass work artist. Kraus heard of Wright's work and was so excited at the thought of living in a work of art himself, he wrote to Wright, who sent him the plans for his 'little house'.

Before it was built, numerous contractors declined the job as too difficult to construct. Its angles required custom bricks to be made. It was built by a young former Seabee named Lee Patterson.

In 1997, the house was recognized with listing on the National Register of Historic Places of the National Park Service. Russell Kraus sold the house in 2001 to a non-profit organization formed for the specific purpose of saving it. The title was subsequently transferred to the St. Louis County Parks and Recreation Department, which maintains the 10.5-acre (42,000 m^{2}) grounds as Ebsworth Park. The house and park are open to the public by appointment only. Tours are available for a small fee.

It is located in a "tract of woods and rolling meadowland located on the east side of Ballas Road (120 North Ballas), south of Dougherty Ferry Road at the west edge of Kirkwood, Missouri, a suburban municipality near St. Louis. The house is reached by an 800-foot-long private driveway, which crosses a small branch of Sugar Creek across a small bridge, a non-contributing structure, then winds up a hillside through a deciduous woods. Just short of the crest of the hill, the woods give way to meadow, revealing this unusual house, sitting in the center of a grove of tall, slender persimmon trees. The house, though modest in size, is a masterpiece of geometric design, in Wright's unique style, using the 60-degree/120-degree parallelogram as the design motif."

As of 1996 the house's cedar roof shakes roof had been replaced by asphalt shingles, and there was a problem of spalling of bricks: "The spalling problems seem to have been due to the nature of the brick, which is unusually hard and dense. The brick is laid in Wrightian fashion, with the vertical joints flush and the horizontal joints deeply raked to accentuate the horizontal lines of the single-story building, with its wide roof overhangs and extended cantilevers."

== See also ==
- List of Frank Lloyd Wright works
- Parks in Greater St. Louis

== Notes ==
- Storrer, William Allin (1993). The Frank Lloyd Wright Companion. Chicago: University of Chicago Press. ISBN 978-0-226-77624-8. (S.340)
