= River Des Peres Park =

Municipal park in St. Louis, Missouri, US

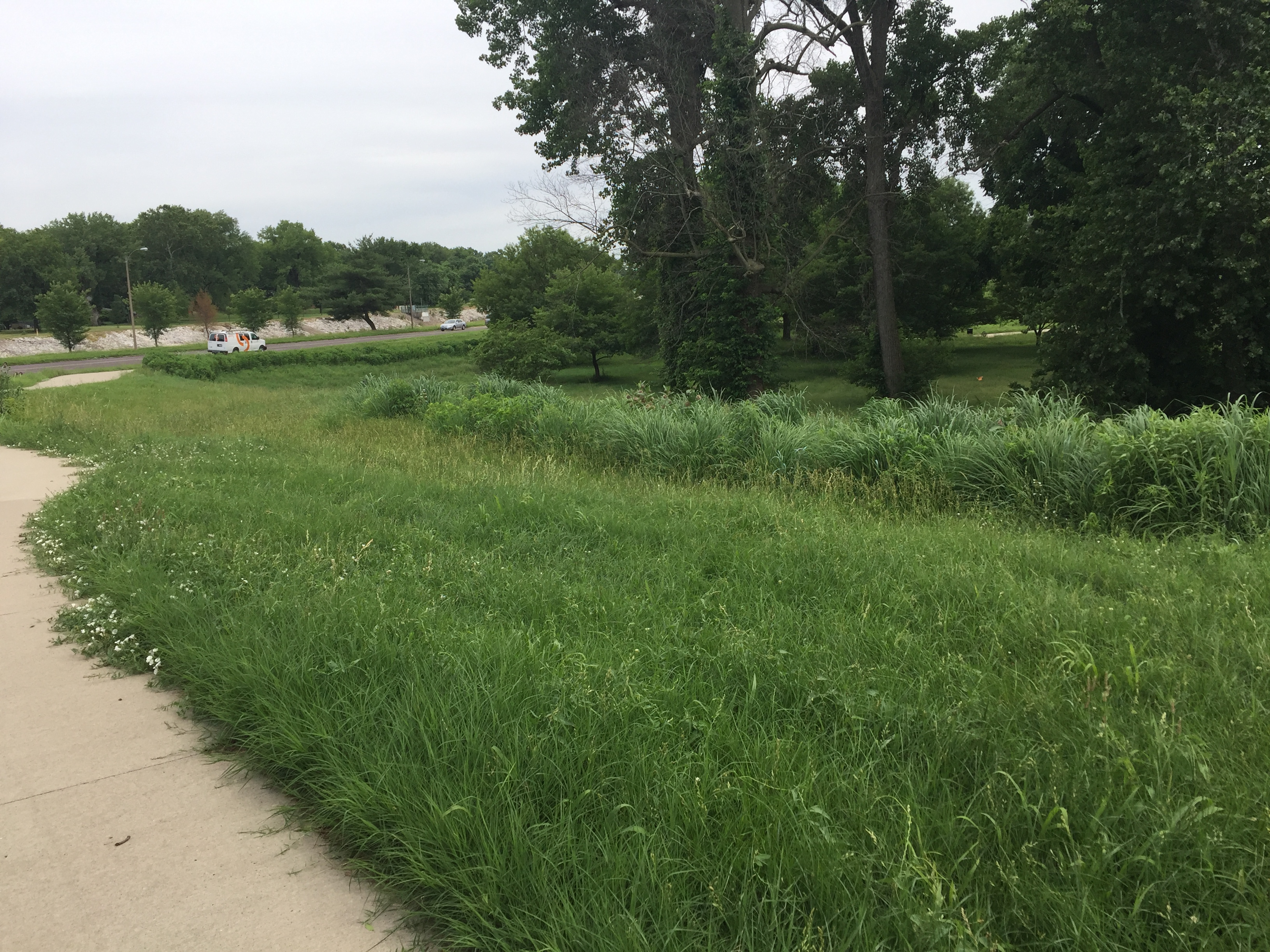
- River des Peres Park, June 2018
- Interactive map of River Des Peres Park
- Type: Urban Park
- Location: St. Louis, Missouri, United states
- Coordinates: 38.5830°N 90.3120°W
- Area: 145 acres (59 ha)
- Created: 1934
- Operator: St. Louis Department of Parks, Recreation, and Forestry
- Status: Open
- Public transit: MetroBus
- Website: http://stlouis-mo.gov

River Des Peres Park is a municipal park in St. Louis that opened in 1934. River Des Peres Park is located near River Des Peres and the St. Louis City/County border line. The parks borders are Lansdowne Avenue, Morganford Avenue, and River Des Peres Boulevard. It is located near the neighborhoods of St. Louis Hills, Lindenwood Park, and Princeton Heights.

== See also ==
- People and culture of St. Louis, Missouri
- Neighborhoods of St. Louis
- Parks in St. Louis, Missouri
