= St. Louis Place Park =

Park in Missouri, United States

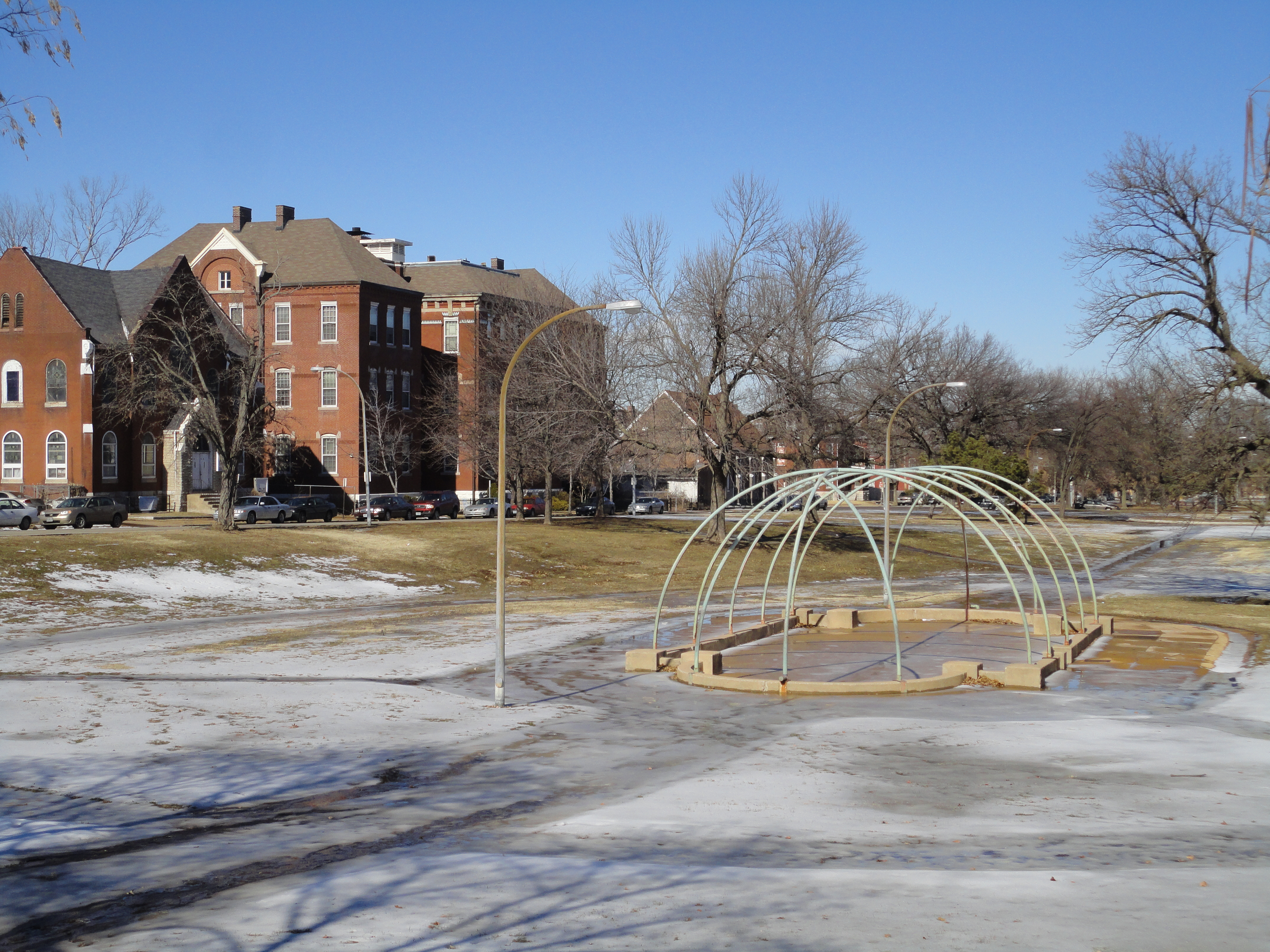
- St. Louis Place Park spray pool
- Interactive map of St. Louis Place Park
- Type: Urban park
- Location: St. Louis, Missouri, United States
- Coordinates: 38.6505°N 90.2048°W
- Area: 14.13 acres (5.72 ha)
- Created: 1850
- Operator: St. Louis Department of Parks, Recreation, and Forestry
- Status: Open
- Public transit: MetroBus
- Website: stlouis-mo.gov

St. Louis Place Park is a city park in St. Louis, Missouri. Located in the city's north side, the park spans 10 blocks between 21st Street and Rauschenbach Avenue.

== Geography ==
St. Louis Place Park is located in the neighborhood of St. Louis Place.

=== Surrounding areas ===
The park is lined with townhouses and bungalows, along with several churches, a civic building, and the St. Louis Fire Department's Engine House No. 5.

== See also ==
- People and culture of St. Louis, Missouri
- Neighborhoods of St. Louis
- Parks in St. Louis, Missouri
