= Dardenne Township, St. Charles County, Missouri =

Township in the American state of Missouri

Coordinates: 38.7650202°N 90.6794306°W

Dardenne Township is an inactive township in St. Charles County, in the U.S. state of Missouri.

Dardenne Township most likely was erected in 1818, taking its name from Dardenne Creek.
