= Lone Elk County Park =

Park in Western St. Louis county, Missouri

Lone Elk Park
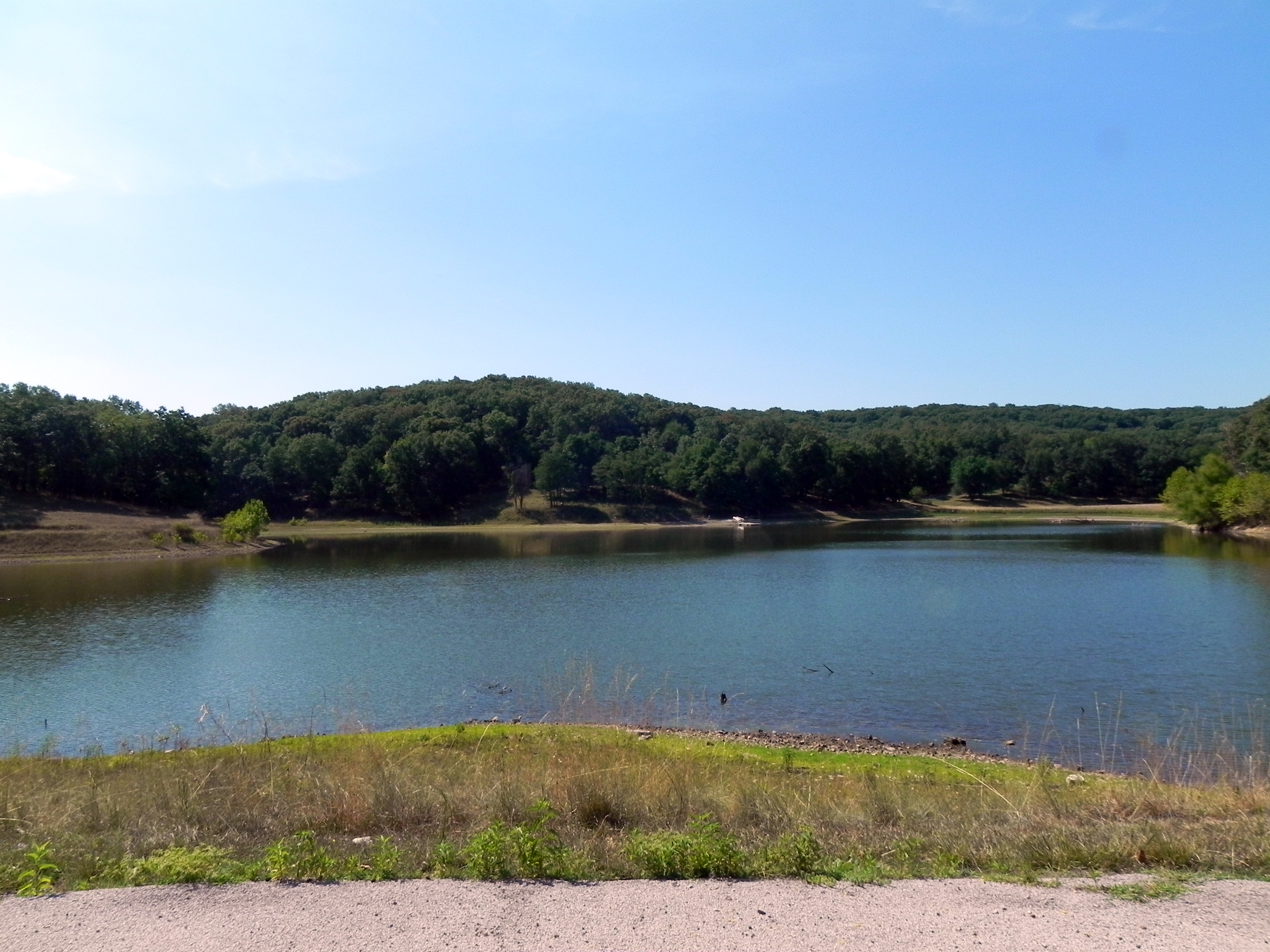

- Location within Missouri Location within the United States
- Location: St. Louis County, Missouri, United States
- Coordinates: 38.532482°N 90.541363°W
- Area: 0.85 sq mi (2.2 km^{2})
- Established: 1964
- Website: Lone Elk Park

Lone Elk Park is a county park in the U.S. state of Missouri consisting of 546 acres (2.21 km^{2}) located in St. Louis County west of the town of Valley Park. The park is located adjacent to Interstate 44, the World Bird Sanctuary, Castlewood State Park, and Tyson Research Center.

Lone Elk Park was originally part of the Tyson Valley Powder Plant during World War II. After the war the area became a county park and herds of elk and bison were established in 1948. The land was reacquired by the federal government during the Korean War, and the wildlife herds were destroyed for safety reasons in 1958, but one lone bull elk survived. In 1964 St. Louis County acquired 405 acres (1.64 km^{2}) for Tyson County Park, which became Lone Elk Park in 1966. The park officially opened on October 17, 1971, and six bison were acquired from the St. Louis Zoo in July 1973.

There are driving routes that provide views of the elk and bison, often at close proximity. The park is also home to many deer, wild turkey and waterfowl. Domestic animals are not permitted whatsoever, even if confined to a vehicle. Research was conducted in 2016 to determine if a sinkhole was under the lake. The boat dock has been removed. Fishing was closed in 2017 in an effort to rebuild the fish population.

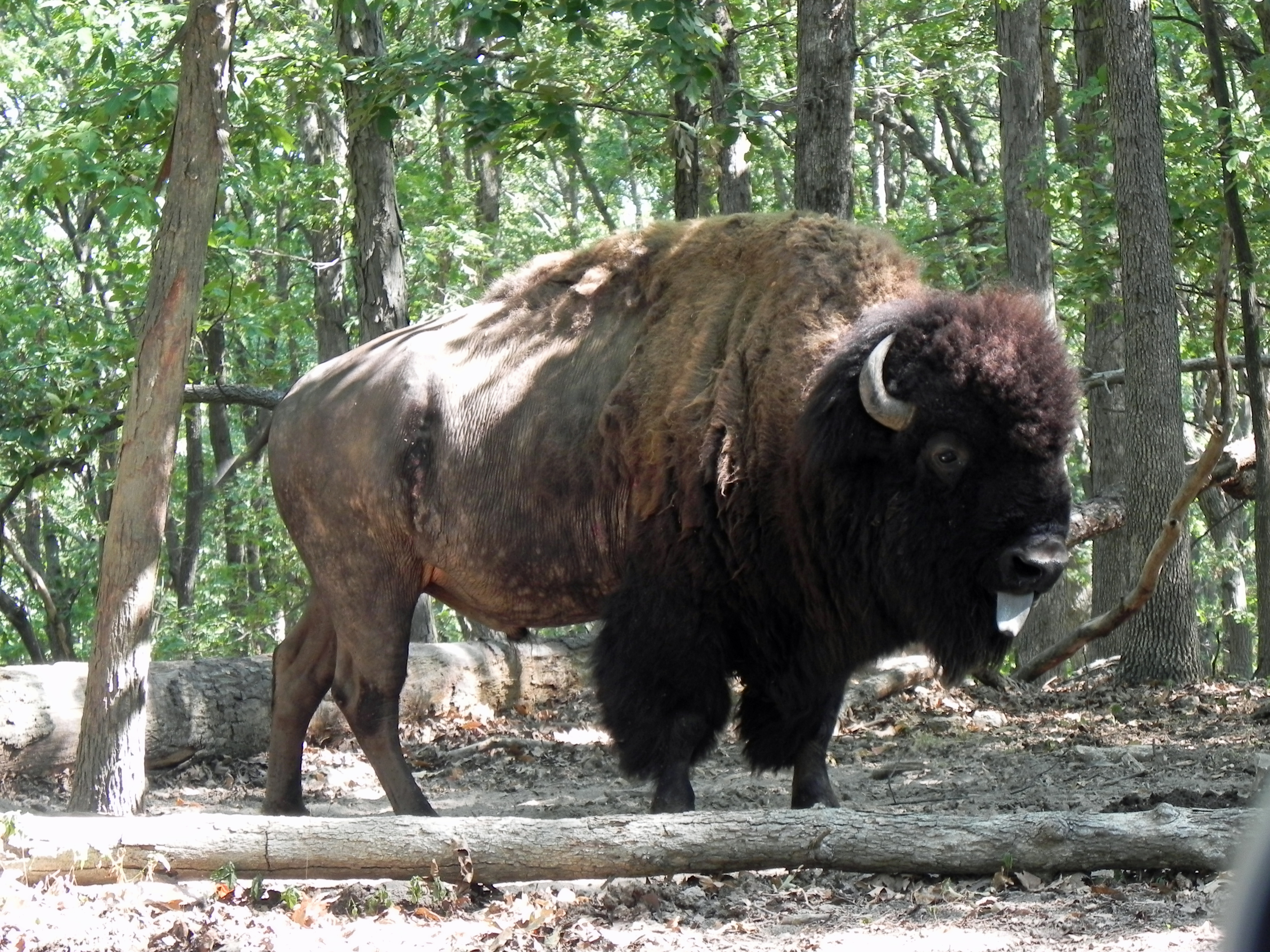
Bison

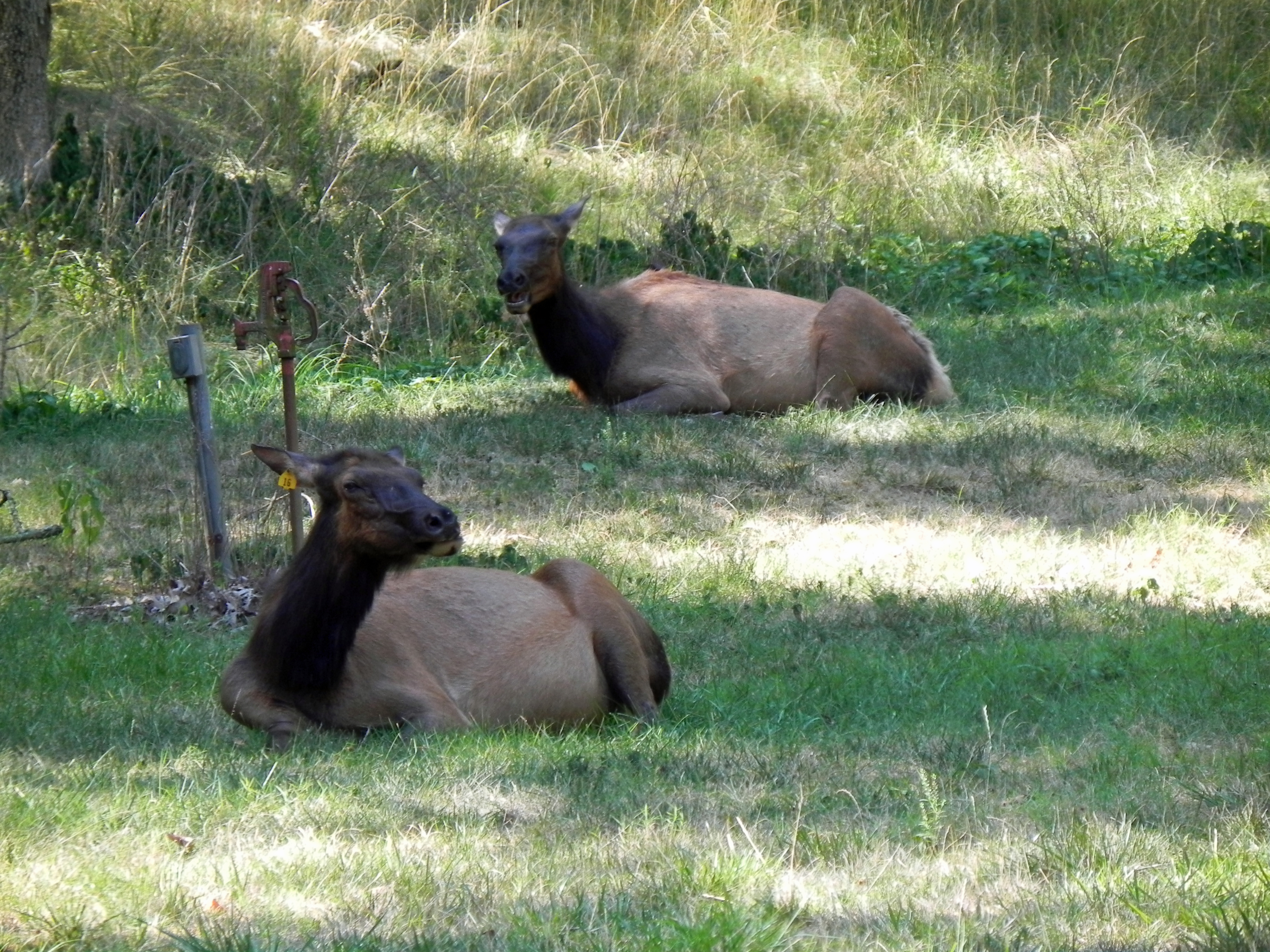
Elk
