= Towne Park =

Public park in Foristell, Missouri

- Location within Missouri Location within the United States
- Location: 100 Towne Park Drive, Foristell, Missouri
- Nearest city: St. Louis
- Coordinates: 38.879328°N 90.900989°W
- Area: 109 acres (44 ha)
- Created: May 11, 2012
- Operator: St. Charles County
- Open: yes
- Website: www.sccmo.org/739/Towne-Park

Towne Park is a public park in Foristell, Missouri. It is operated by St. Charles County. The park, which opened on May 11, 2012, is named for the Towne family, who donated the land. It is the 10th park in the St. Charles County Parks system.

The park features a historic home, trails, a playground, a pond, and a nature classroom. The nature explore classroom is certified by the Dimensions Educational Research Foundation and The Arbor Day Foundation.

== Restoration efforts ==
The Boyd Plantation house was built in 1828 for the Boyd family, who came to Missouri from Kentucky. The property was occupied by the Towne family beginning in the 1950s, during which time it was painted pink and served as a popular roadside antique store known as "The Pink Plantation". The Towne family occupied the house until shortly before March 2004, when an electrical fire caused extensive damage to the house.

St. Charles County restored and rebuilt the house for educational purposes. The county used the original building plans and moved the house about 100 yards to prepare for possible future expansions of highway 40-61. The parks department received the 2007 McReynolds Award from the Missouri Alliance for Historic Preservation for its efforts in restoring the homestead.

== See also ==
- Daniel Boone Home
- Quail Ridge Park
