= Castlewood State Park =

State park in Missouri, United States

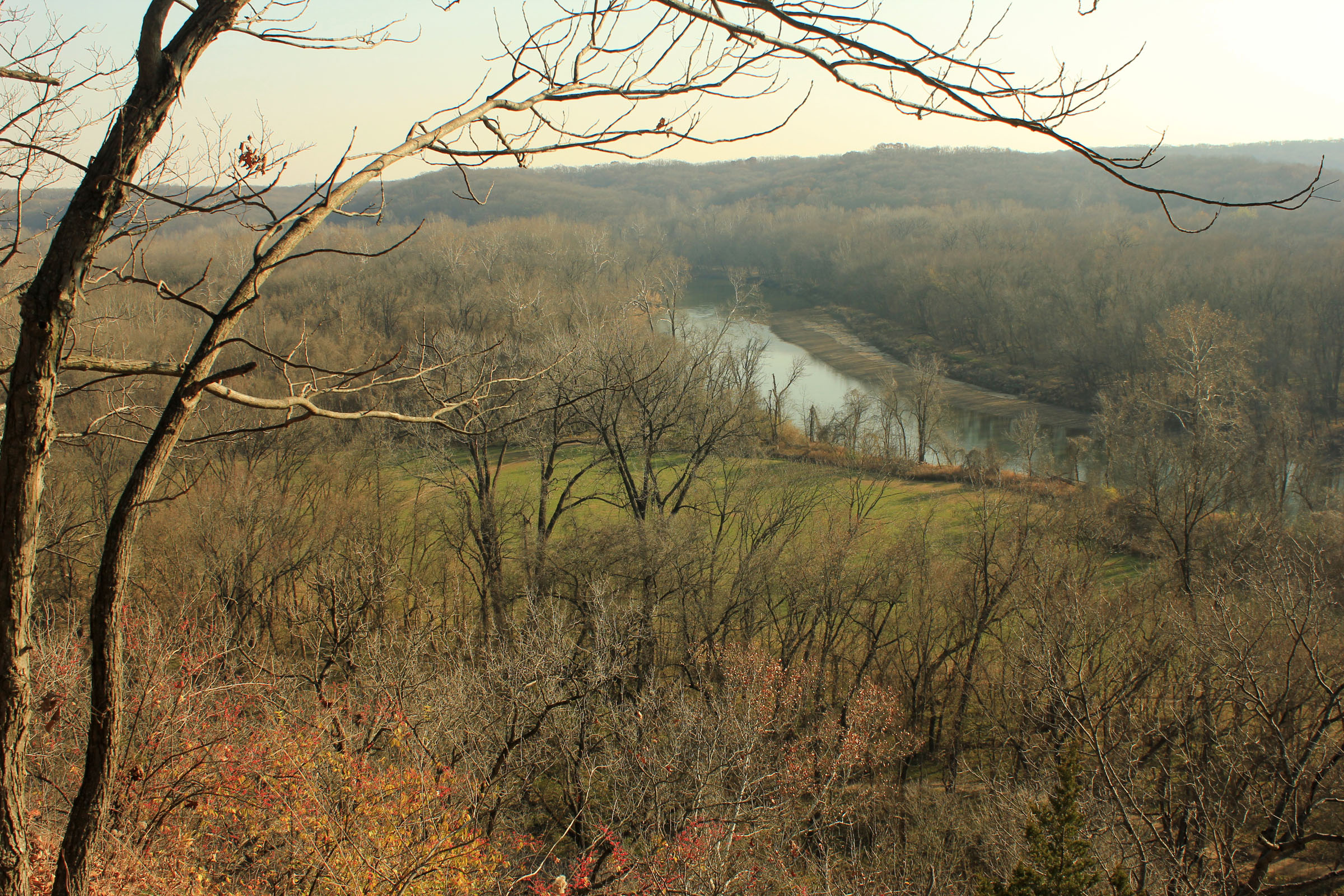
- Bluff view in Castlewood State Park

- Location within Missouri Location within the United States
- Location: St. Louis County, Missouri, United States
- Coordinates: 38°32′50″N 90°32′38″W
- Area: 1,818.77 acres (736.03 ha)
- Elevation: 417 ft (127 m)
- Established: 1974
- Administrator: Missouri Department of Natural Resources
- Visitors: 735,979 (in 2022)
- Website: Official website

Castlewood State Park is a public recreation area and Missouri state park occupying 1,818 acres (736 ha) which straddles the Meramec River in St. Louis County, Missouri. The most visited section of the state park lies on the north side of the Meramec; the park acreage on the south side of the river is accessed from Lone Elk County Park and includes the World Bird Sanctuary.

== History ==
=== Lincoln Beach ===
Summer day at Lincoln Beach, early to mid-20th century.

In the early 20th century, the area of the park was a developed resort town, Lincoln Beach.

Lincoln Beach existed from about 1915 into the 1940s, with its highest popularity in the 1920s. The Missouri Pacific Railroad ran regular service from St. Louis to Lincoln Beach, and the resort hosted around 10,000 visitors on summer weekends.

Venues included the popular Lincoln Lodge and the Lone Wolf Club, a private speakeasy serving liquor illegally. (Prohibition was in effect from 1920 to 1933).

There were a couple hundred buildings here, ranging from clubhouses to dance halls to general stores. A place to get a haircut, a place to get ice cream, and a place to get some whiskey.

— Jeff Bonney

After World War II, visitor numbers steadily declined, due to factors including the advent of air conditioning and the switch to automobile transport, which allowed people to choose spots alternative to the railroad-served Lincoln Beach.

By the 21st century, few traces remained of Lincoln Beach. All the buildings were destroyed over time, and the man-made beach itself was entirely washed away by regular flooding. A few foundations and ruins survive in the woods, and the concrete grand staircase which runs from the bottomlands up into the bluff remains in use by hikers, as does another, wooden, staircase.

=== State park ===
Castlewood State Park was established as a state park in 1974.

The park has a history of fatalities due to the Meramac River. Since June 30, 2004, there has been a total of 16 deaths along the river within the park. Of the 12 drowning deaths, only one was the result of intoxication.

The most deadly incident occurred on July 9, 2006. Five children died in a mishap along the river during a church outing. Joseph Miller, 16, lost his footing on one of the river's unexpected dropoffs and was swept away by an undertow. Damon Johnson, 17, attempted to rescue Miller, but was also swept away. Damon's siblings, Dana Johnson (13), Ryan Mason (14) and Bryant Barnes (10), tried to rescue him. Deandre Sherman (16) also waded in to try to save their friends. All of the children, with the exception of Joseph Miller, drowned.

A comprehensive list of fatalities as of 2021 includes: 19-year-old unnamed male (2004), 13 year old Dana Johnson (2006), 10 year old Bryant James (2006), 16 year old Joseph Miller (2006), 14 year old Ryan Mason (2006), 16 year old Deandre Sherman (2006), 15-year-old Isaiah Green (2007), 18-year-old Luis Baez Gonzales (2011), 20-year-old Salvatore Jasso (2011), 21-year-old Philip Schwalm (2012), 18-yearold Henry Manu (2016), 17-year-old Samuel Neal (2016), 12-year-old Deniya Johnson (2018), 35-year-old Rose Shaw (2018), 16-year-old Kara Wrice (2021), 19-year-old Juan Sajbin (2022)

A retired hydrologist for the Army Corps Of Engineers, Gary Dyhouse, remarked that the slope of the Meramac River is steeper than all other rivers in the area. According to Metro West Fire Chief Mike Krause, these sudden dropoffs, combined with the river's swift currents, are what cause swimmers to drown.

== Activities and amenities ==
The park offers fishing and boating on the Meramec River and more than 26 miles of trails for hiking, mountain biking and equestrian use.

Park trails
Trail	Length	Uses	Notes
Al Foster Trail	4.7 miles (7.6 km)	Hiking, biking	Abandoned railroad bed following the river from Glencoe to Sherman Beach County Park.
Castlewood Loop	2.75 miles (4.4 km)	Hiking, biking, equestrian	Floodplain trail skirting Lincoln Beach.
Cedar Bluff Loop	2.25 miles (3.6 km)	Hiking, biking	Accessed from Al Foster Trail; climbs to highest point in the park.
Chubb Trail	6.5 miles (10.5 km)	Hiking, biking, equestrian	Runs from Lone Elk County Park to West Tyson County Park.
Grotpeter Trail	3.75 miles (6.0 km)	Hiking, biking, equestrian	Challenging terrain with numerous elevation changes.
Lone Wolf Trail	1.5 miles (2.4 km)	Hiking, biking	Rugged trail named for a former area roadhouse.
River Scene Trail	3.25 miles (5.2 km)	Hiking, biking	Passes former resort sites; only hiking is allowed on the section atop the bluffs; hiking and biking on the bottomland section.
Stinging Nettle Trail	2.5 miles (4.0 km)	Hiking, biking	Follows river from Sherman Beach County Park to a junction with Al Foster Trail.

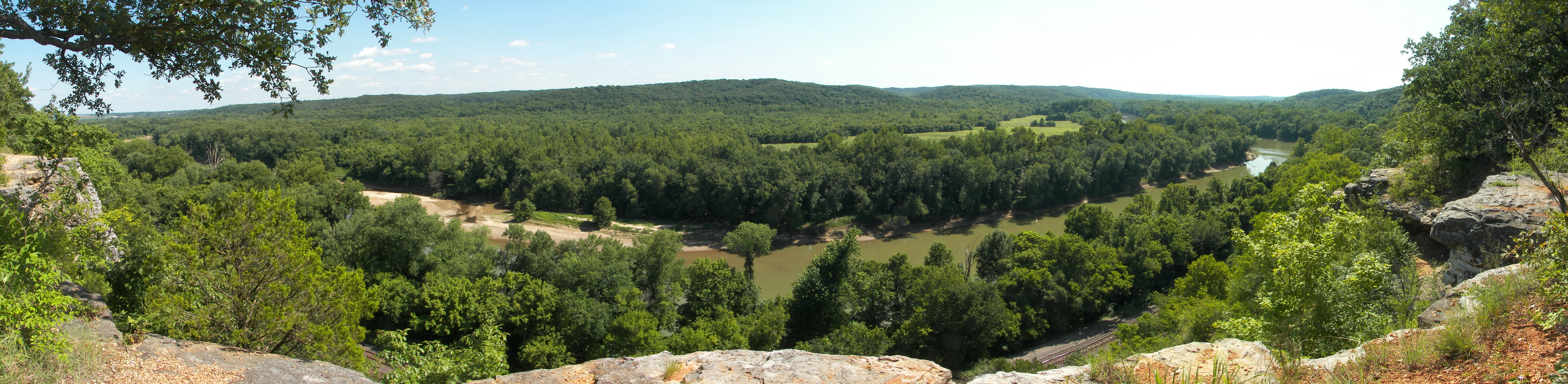
View of the Meramec River valley from Castlewood's bluffs
