= Bohrer Park =

Park in Saint Louis County, Missouri, United States

- Interactive map of Bohrer Park
- Location: 5705 South Lindbergh Boulevard, Saint Louis, MO 63123
- Coordinates: 38.519°N 90.353°W
- Opened: 1960
- Owner: St. Louis County Department of Parks and Recreation
- Open: 8 A.M. - 30 minutes after sunset
- Public transit: MetroBus
- Website: https://stlouiscountymo.gov/st-louis-county-departments/parks/places/bohrer-park/

Bohrer Park is a park located in St. Louis County, Missouri, United States. The park is owned and administered by the St. Louis County Department of Parks and Recreation.

== History ==
St. Louis County bought site in 1958 and 1960. The sale was funded by a bond issue and the sale of land to the Missouri Department of Transportation for development of Interstate 270. Between 1963 and 1981 the park included a "Lion's Pit" which was built by the local branch of the Lion's Club. The pit was removed because it was being used after hours.

== Name ==
The park is named after George E. Bohrer, who served in the U.S. Army in World War II. After the war, Bohrer served in the Missouri House of Representatives from 1946 to 1952 and in the St. Louis County Council from 1956 until his death in 1960.

== Amenities ==
The park includes the following:

- A playground
- Tennis courts
- A fountain play area
- Athletic fields
- A reservable shelter
