= Kinetic Park =

Business/Technology park in Huntington, West Virginia, United States

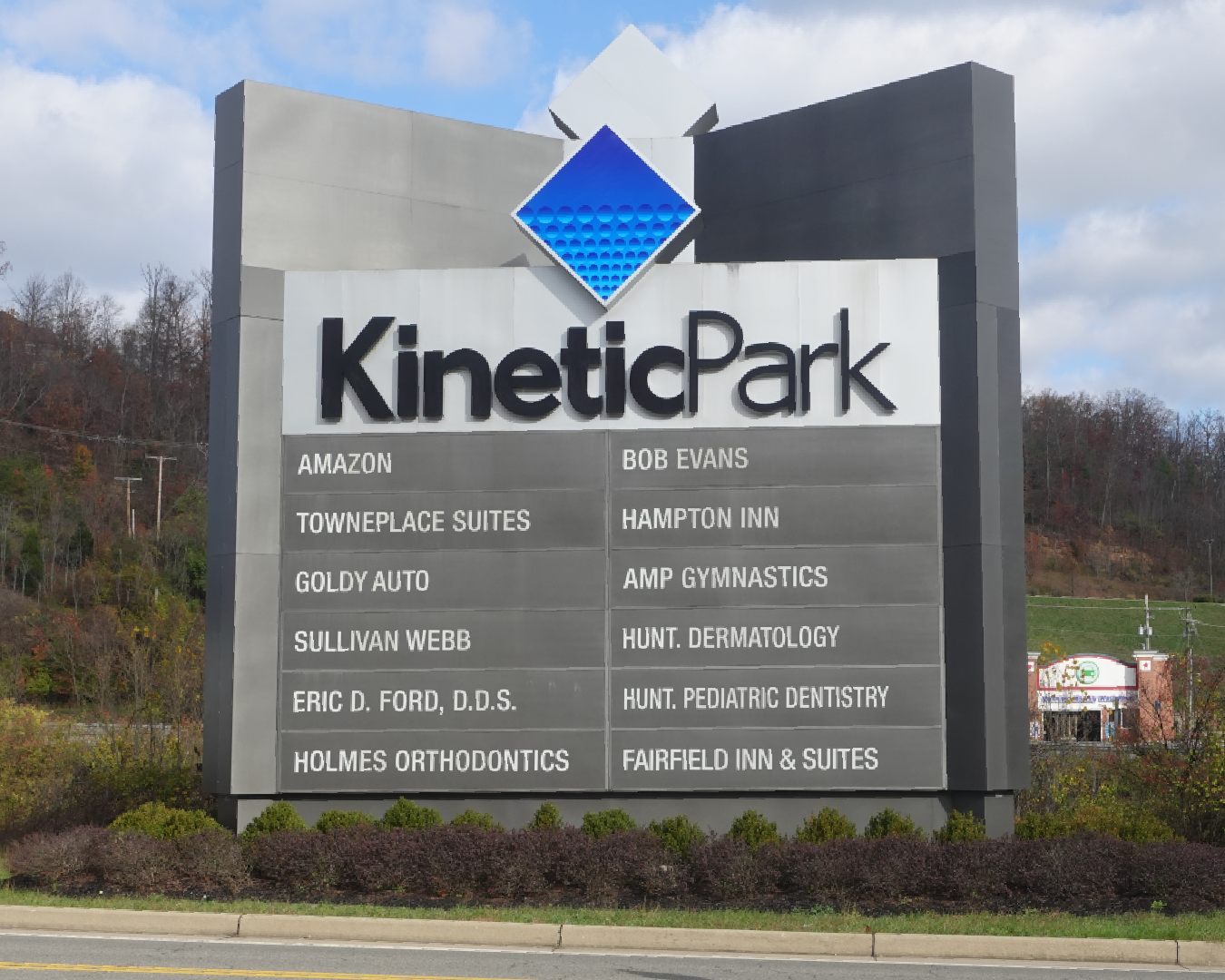
- The Kinetic Park sign in 2024.
- Interactive map of Kinetic Park
- Coordinates: 38°23′43.908″N 82°25′4.584″W
- Opening date: 2005
- No. of tenants: 12
- No. of workers: 1,300 (2016)

Kinetic Park is a 95-acre (380,000 m^{2}) business/technology park located adjacent to Interstate 64 in Huntington, West Virginia.

== Features ==
There are two sections of Kinetic Park. The lower section of the park will be used for commercial businesses, and the upper section of the park will be used for technology startups and corporations. Currently, there are three commercial and eleven technology lots available.

=== Commercial outlots ===
The lower level of Kinetic Park has over 12 acres (49,000 m^{2}) available for commercial uses that will complement the Technology Park area. Intended uses include restaurants, lodging, banking, personal services and other retail businesses that can conveniently serve employees of the Technology Park and surrounding area.

==== Tenants ====
- AMP Athletics
- Bob Evans
- Goldy Auto
- Hampton by Hilton
- Taco Bell
- TownePlace Suites

=== Technology park ===
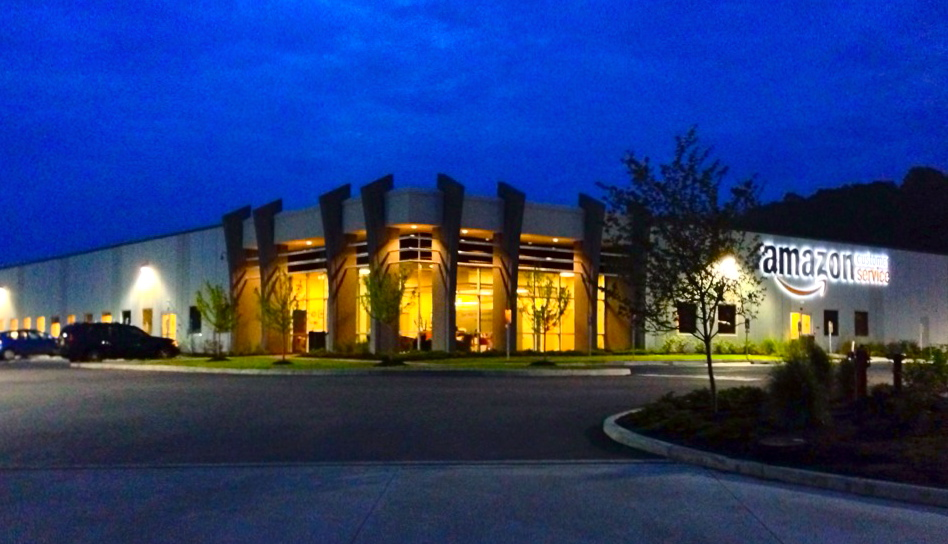
Amazon Customer Service Center in Kinetic Park

The upper level of Kinetic Park consists of nearly 23 acres (93,000 m^{2}) available for businesses that desire a signature location within a state-of-the-art high technology equipped office park. The first tenants, Huntington Dermatology and Sullivan Webb, would move into a new 10,000 sq ft (930 m^{2}) structure in spring 2007. Amazon.com began construction on a new customer support call center at the site in July 2011, to replace the call center it had located in downtown Huntington. Work on the building was completed the following October and was opened soon afterward.

==== Tenants ====
- Amazon Inc. call center
- Fairfield by Marriott
- General & Cosmetic Dentistry
- Huntington Dermatology
- Huntington Pediatric Dentistry
- Sullivan Webb Accountants

== See also ==
- Cityscape of Huntington, West Virginia
