= Indian Camp Creek =

Stream in the American state of Missouri

Location
- Country: United States
- State: Missouri
- Region: Warren and St. Charles counties

Physical characteristics
- Source
  - coordinates: 38°48′36″N 91°06′14″W
- Mouth
  - coordinates: 38°53′11″N 90°55′37″W
  - elevation: 456 ft (139 m)

Indian Camp Creek is a stream in northeast Warren County and northwest St. Charles County in the U.S. state of Missouri. It is a tributary of Big Creek.

The stream headwaters arise just south of Interstate 70 and 1.5 miles east of Truesdale. The stream flows north and east passing under Missouri Route J and is impounded south of the Incline Village Golf Course at the Warren-St. Charles county line. The stream turns north and enters Big Creek at the St. Charles-Lincoln county line just west of US Route 61.

Indian Camp Creek was named so named on account of an Indian settlement near its course.

== See also ==
- List of rivers of Missouri
