= Memorial Plaza (St. Louis, Missouri) =

Park in Missouri, United States

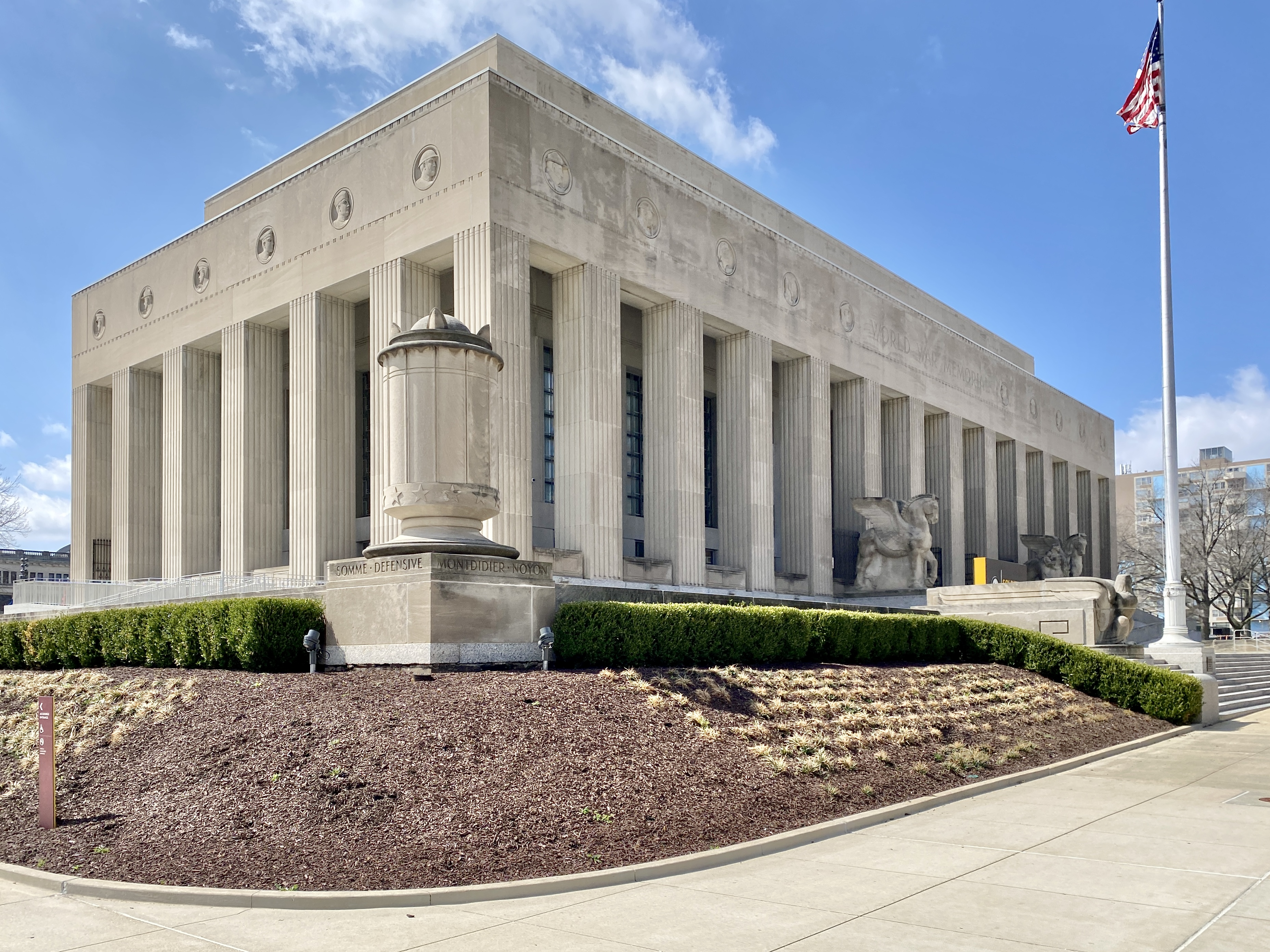
- Soldiers Memorial sits in the center of Memorial Plaza
- Interactive map of Memorial Plaza
- Type: Civic center, urban park, war memorial
- Location: St. Louis, Missouri
- Coordinates: 38.6288°N 90.2027°W
- Area: 11.33 acres (4.59 ha)
- Opened: 1932 (Memorial Plaza); 1938 (Soldiers Memorial); 1960 (Extension)
- Operator: City of St. Louis; Missouri History Museum
- Parking: Street parking
- Public transit: MetroBus; Red Blue; At Civic Center, Union Station
- Website: stlouis-mo.gov

Memorial Plaza is a public park in the Downtown West neighborhood of St. Louis, Missouri. The park makes up the center section of the Gateway Mall and contains memorials honoring St. Louis veterans of World War I, World War II, and the Korean and Vietnam wars. The park extends from Tucker Boulevard to 18th Street between Market and Chestnut streets.

== History ==
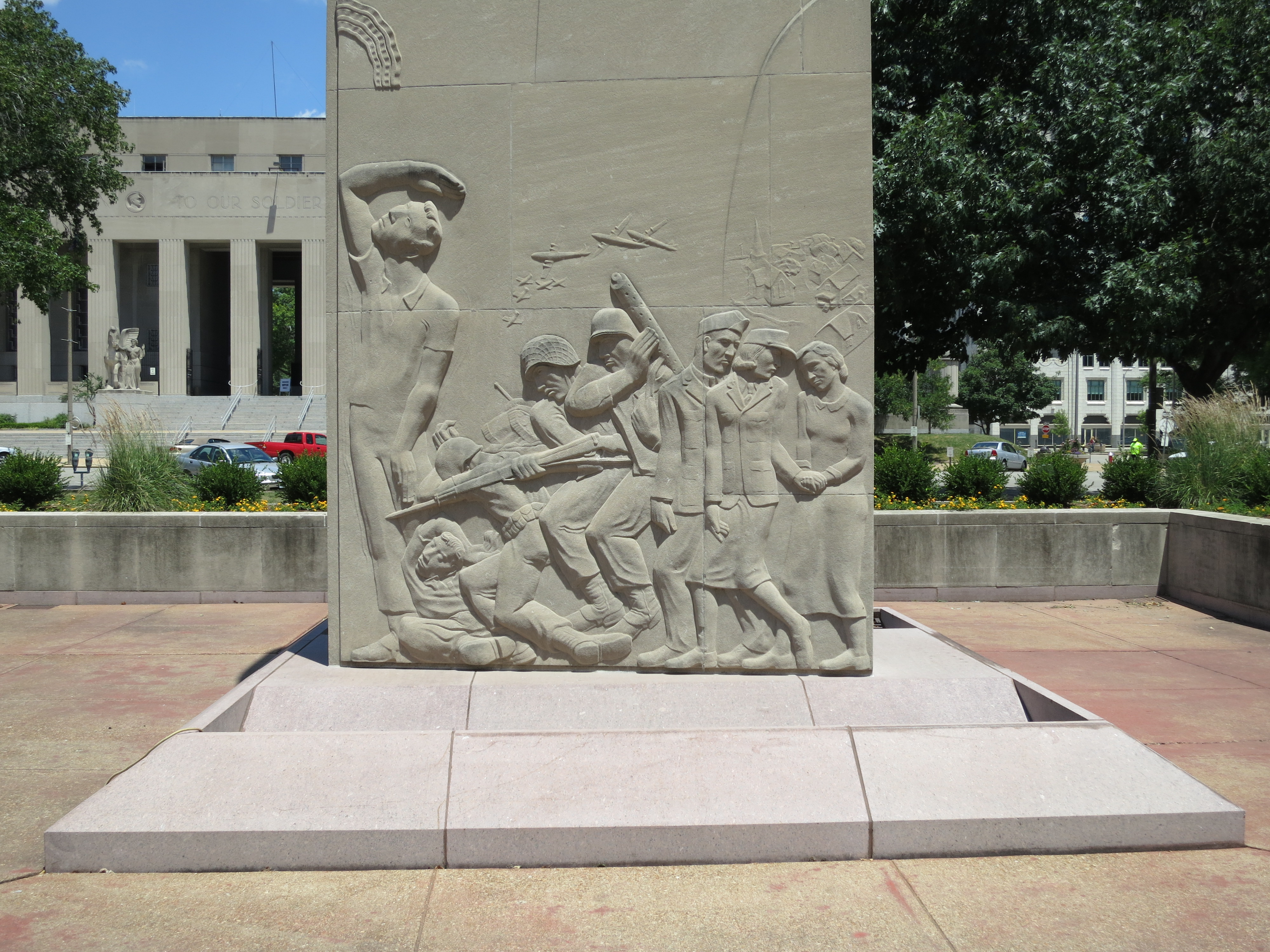
Veterans Memorial

Memorial Plaza is made up of nine blocks of mostly green space between Tucker Boulevard and 18th Street. The first section opened between Tucker and 15th Street in 1932 and includes Eternal Flame Park, Kaufman Park, and Poelker Park. Soldiers Memorial opened on the center block in 1938 and also includes the World War II Memorial Court. It centers the axis that frames the entrance to the Central Library to the north on Olive Street and the former Municipal Courts Building to the south on Market Street. St. Louis City Hall and the Stifel Theatre also front this section of the park.

In 1960, a three block extension of Memorial Plaza opened between 15th and 18th streets with 16th Street being eliminated between Market and Chestnut streets. These blocks were lightly landscaped and the only notable feature were formations of concrete and stained glass screens located around small fountains. In 1961, the Plaza Square Apartments opened bringing 1,090 units to the four blocks north of Memorial Plaza between 15th and 17th streets. The main St. Louis Post Office on Market faces this section of the park.

According to the 2009 Gateway Mall Master Plan, Memorial Plaza is to be split into a Civic Room and a Neighborhood Room. The Civic Room includes the original 1932 section and is planned to become the predominant space for outdoor festivals and events. The Neighborhood Room will include the 1960 addition and is to be primarily residential in nature, with facilities like lawns, playgrounds, sand-volleyball courts, and youth soccer fields for nearby residents.

In 2014, an agreement between the city, the Missouri Historical Society and Soldiers Memorial, LLC allowed for the Missouri History Museum to begin processing and cataloging Soldiers Memorial's collections. In November 2015, the city's Board of Aldermen signed off on the museum's takeover of the memorial. The city retained ownership of the building with the museum running day to day operations.

In 2016, Soldiers Memorial closed for a $30 million renovation that saw the doubling of exhibition space, repairs to aging equipment, and aesthetic and accessibility improvements. The museum and adjacent Memorial Court reopened after renovations were completed in November 2018.
