= West Tyson County Park =

Park in St. Louis County, Missouri, US

- Location within Missouri Location within the United States
- Location: St. Louis County, Missouri, United States
- Coordinates: 38.518573°N 90.584357°W
- Area: 1.05 sq mi (2.7 km^{2})
- Established: 1955
- Website: West Tyson County Park

West Tyson County Park is a county park in the U.S. state of Missouri consisting of 673 acres (2.72 km^{2}) located in St. Louis County east of the town of Eureka. The park is located north of Interstate 44, west of Tyson Research Center, east of Route 66 State Park, and south and east of the Meramec River.

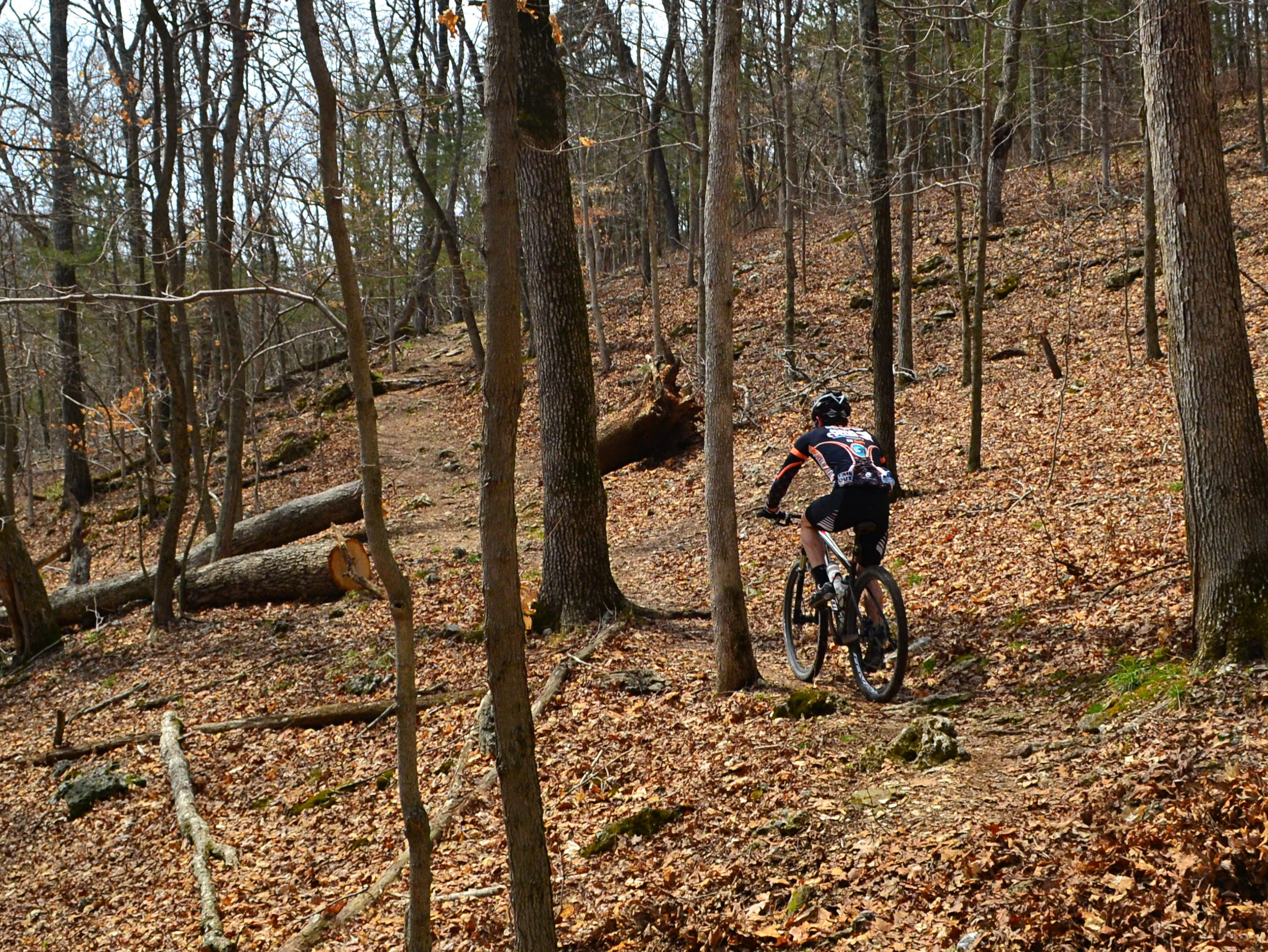
Mountain biker on the Rock Quarry Trail in West Tyson County Park

West Tyson County Park was originally part of the Tyson Valley Powder Plant during World War II. After the war 210 acres (0.85 km^{2}) were acquired by St. Louis County in 1955. In 1979 an additional 410 acres (1.7 km^{2}) were acquired. The Chubb Trail was developed in 1985. The William Epstein Memorial Prairie creation project was begun in 1988.
