= Dardenne Creek =

Tributary of Mississippi River

Coordinates: 38°51′39″N 90°32′10″W

Dardenne Creek is a stream in St. Charles and Warren counties in the U.S. state of Missouri. It is a tributary of the Mississippi River.

The creek most likely has the name of the local Dardenne family. Many variant names have been recorded, including "Darden Creek", "Dardene River", "Dardenne River", "Dardonne Creek", and "Dardonne River".

At Old Town, St. Peters, Missouri, Dardenne Creek has a mean discharge of 120 cubic feet per second.

== See also ==
- List of rivers of Missouri
