= Flint Hill, Missouri =

- City
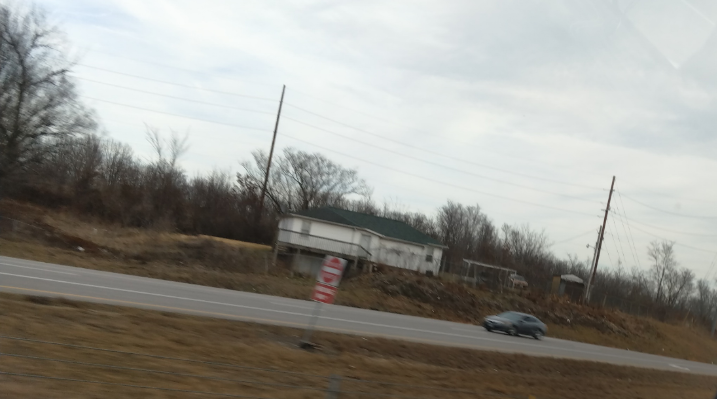
- Flint Hill in 2025

- Location of Flint Hill, Missouri
- Coordinates: 38°51′50″N 90°52′40″W
- Country: United States
- State: Missouri
- County: St. Charles

Area
  - Total: 2.81 sq mi (7.28 km^{2})
  - Land: 2.81 sq mi (7.28 km^{2})
  - Water: 0 sq mi (0.00 km^{2})
- Elevation: 459 ft (140 m)

Population (2020)
  - Total: 981
  - Density: 349.1/sq mi (134.77/km^{2})
- Time zone: UTC-6 (Central (CST))
  - Summer (DST): UTC-5 (CDT)
- ZIP code: 63385
- Area code: 636
- FIPS code: 29-24688
- GNIS feature ID: 2394771
- Website: cityofflinthill.com

Flint Hill is a town in northwestern St. Charles County, Missouri, United States. As of the 2020 census, Flint Hill had a population of 981.

== History ==
Flint Hill was officially founded in 1838 by Captain Taliferro P. Grantham. The community took its name from Flint Hill, Rappahannock County, Virginia, the native home of a share of the first settlers. A post office called Flint Hill has been in operation since 1836.

== Geography ==
Flint Hill is approximately 2.5 miles north of Wentzville just east of U.S. Route 61 on Missouri Route P. McCoy Creek flows past to the north of the community.

According to the United States Census Bureau, the city has a total area of 2.47 square miles (6.40 km^{2}), all land.

== Demographics ==
Historical population
Census	Pop.	Note	%±
1980	219		—
1990	229		4.6%
2000	379		65.5%
2010	525		38.5%
2020	981		86.9%
U.S. Decennial Census

=== 2010 census ===
As of the census of 2010, there were 525 people, 179 households, and 150 families living in the city. The population density was 212.6 inhabitants per square mile (82.1/km^{2}). There were 187 housing units at an average density of 75.7 per square mile (29.2/km^{2}). The racial makeup of the city was 99.0% White, 0.4% African American, 0.2% from other races, and 0.4% from two or more races. Hispanic or Latino of any race were 1.0% of the population.

There were 179 households, of which 45.3% had children under the age of 18 living with them, 74.3% were married couples living together, 7.3% had a female householder with no husband present, 2.2% had a male householder with no wife present, and 16.2% were non-families. 14.0% of all households were made up of individuals, and 4.5% had someone living alone who was 65 years of age or older. The average household size was 2.93 and the average family size was 3.20.

The median age in the city was 38.8 years. 29.5% of residents were under the age of 18; 8.1% were between the ages of 18 and 24; 22.3% were from 25 to 44; 29.1% were from 45 to 64; and 11% were 65 years of age or older. The gender makeup of the city was 49.3% male and 50.7% female.

=== 2000 census ===
As of the census of 2000, there were 379 people, 136 households, and 107 families living in the city. The population density was 152.2 inhabitants per square mile (58.8/km^{2}). There were 138 housing units at an average density of 55.4 per square mile (21.4/km^{2}). The racial makeup of the city was 97.10% White, 0.53% African American, 0.26% Asian, and 2.11% from two or more races. Hispanic or Latino of any race were 0.53% of the population.

There were 136 households, out of which 40.4% had children under the age of 18 living with them, 72.1% were married couples living together, 3.7% had a female householder with no husband present, and 21.3% were non-families. 19.9% of all households were made up of individuals, and 8.8% had someone living alone who was 65 years of age or older. The average household size was 2.79 and the average family size was 3.22.

In the city the population was spread out, with 28.2% under the age of 18, 7.4% from 18 to 24, 31.1% from 25 to 44, 22.7% from 45 to 64, and 10.6% who were 65 years of age or older. The median age was 36 years. For every 100 females there were 106.0 males. For every 100 females age 18 and over, there were 109.2 males.

The median income for a household in the city was $47,500, and the median income for a family was $62,750. Males had a median income of $43,333 versus $25,000 for females. The per capita income for the city was $21,194. About 2.9% of families and 2.2% of the population were below the poverty line, including none of those under age 18 and 13.5% of those age 65 or over.

== Education ==
The eastern portion is in the Fort Zumwalt R-II School District. The western portion is in the Wentzville R-IV School District.

Flint Hill is home to St. Theodore Catholic School, a private school for grades K-8 and approximately 300-350 students as of the 2009–2010 school year.
