= Foristell, Missouri =

City in Missouri, US

- City
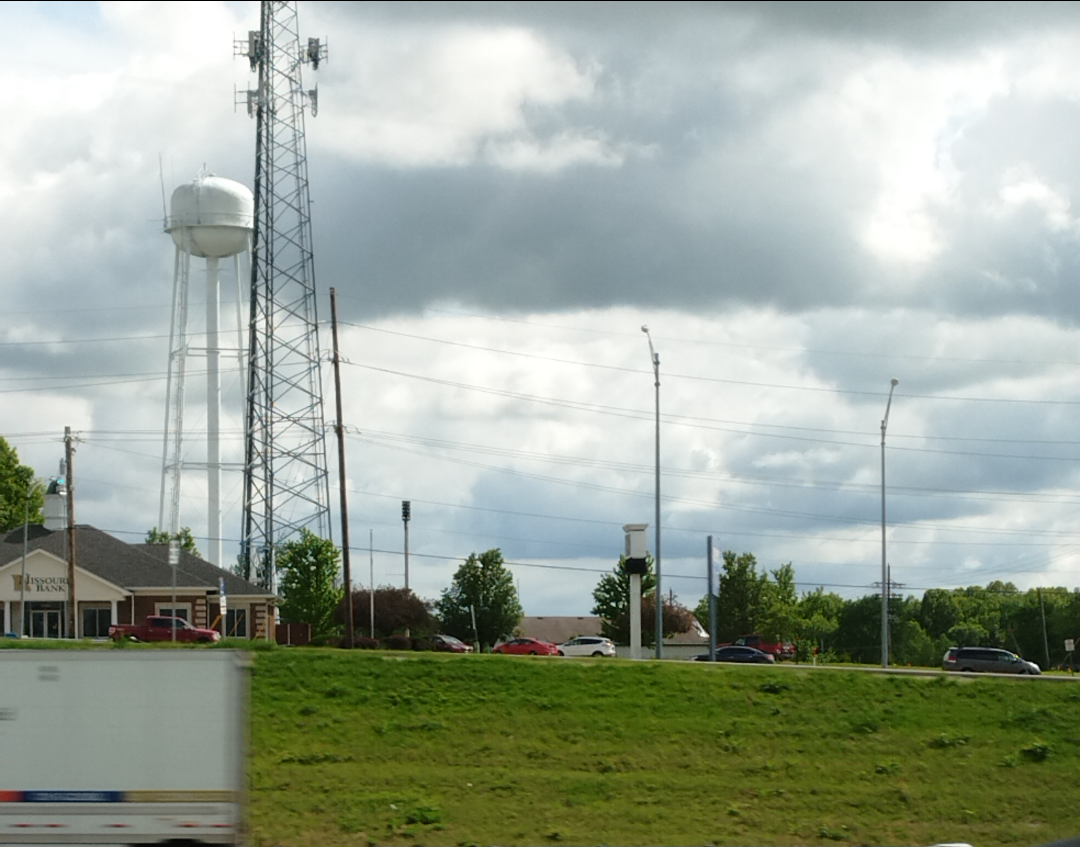
- Foristell in May 2024

- Location of Foristell, Missouri
- Coordinates: 38°48′56″N 90°57′46″W
- Country: United States
- State: Missouri
- Counties: St. Charles, Warren
- Established: 1856
- Named after: Pierre Foristell

Government
  - Mayor: Vacant

Area
  - Total: 6.16 sq mi (15.96 km^{2})
  - Land: 6.06 sq mi (15.70 km^{2})
  - Water: 0.10 sq mi (0.26 km^{2})
- Elevation: 705 ft (215 m)

Population (2020)
  - Total: 550
  - Density: 90.7/sq mi (35.02/km^{2})
- Time zone: UTC-6 (Central (CST))
  - Summer (DST): UTC-5 (CDT)
- ZIP code: 63348
- Area code: 636
- FIPS code: 29-25120
- GNIS feature ID: 2394791
- Website: www.cityofforistell.org

Foristell is a city in St. Charles and Warren counties in the U.S. state of Missouri. It is located approximately 43 miles west of St. Louis. As of the 2020 census, Foristell had a population of 550.

== Geography ==
Foristell is located on I-70 between Wright City to the west and Wentzville to the east. Peruque Creek flows past the south side of the city.

According to the United States Census Bureau, the city has a total area of 5.62 square miles (14.56 km^{2}), of which 5.53 square miles (14.32 km^{2}) is land and 0.09 square miles (0.23 km^{2}) is water.

== Demographics ==
Historical population
Census	Pop.	Note	%±
1980	119		—
1990	144		21.0%
2000	331		129.9%
2010	505		52.6%
2020	550		8.9%
U.S. Decennial Census

As of 2000 the median income for a household in the city was $52,386, and the median income for a family was $53,750. Males had a median income of $43,750 versus $33,333 for females. The per capita income for the city was $22,331. About 7.1% of families and 8.9% of the population were below the poverty line, including 16.3% of those under age 18 and 4.4% of those age 65 or over.

=== 2010 census ===
As of the census of 2010, there were 505 people, 192 households, and 151 families residing in the city. The population density was 91.3 inhabitants per square mile (35.3/km^{2}). There were 208 housing units at an average density of 37.6 per square mile (14.5/km^{2}). The racial makeup of the city was 93.3% White, 3.6% African American, 0.2% Native American, 0.2% Asian, 0.8% from other races, and 2.0% from two or more races. Hispanic or Latino of any race were 0.8% of the population.

There were 192 households, of which 31.8% had children under the age of 18 living with them, 69.3% were married couples living together, 5.7% had a female householder with no husband present, 3.6% had a male householder with no wife present, and 21.4% were non-families. 18.2% of all households were made up of individuals, and 4.7% had someone living alone who was 65 years of age or older. The average household size was 2.63 and the average family size was 2.98.

The median age in the city was 44.8 years. 23% of residents were under the age of 18; 6.9% were between the ages of 18 and 24; 20.5% were from 25 to 44; 35.2% were from 45 to 64; and 14.3% were 65 years of age or older. The gender makeup of the city was 51.5% male and 48.5% female.

== History ==
The city now known as Foristell started in 1856 under the name of "Millville". The first homes, as well as a railroad, were constructed in that year. In 1858, Millville built its first post office.

The community saw rapid growth during the Civil War. A mill and a tobacco factory were both established. It was during this time that a man by the name of Pierre Foristell gained respect throughout the community. The town of Millville officially changed its name to Foristell in 1875.

In 1979, Foristell was incorporated into a village. Just nine years later, however, the residents voted to make it a fourth-class city. This transition came about the following year, in 1989.

== Recreation ==
Foristell is home to Indian Camp Creek Park and Towne Park, which are operated by St. Charles County.

== Education ==
The portion in St. Charles County is in the Wentzville R-IV School District.

The portion in Warren County is in the Wright City R-II School District of Warren County.
