= Daniel Boone Home =

Historic house in Missouri, United States

- U.S. National Register of Historic Places
- U.S. Historic district
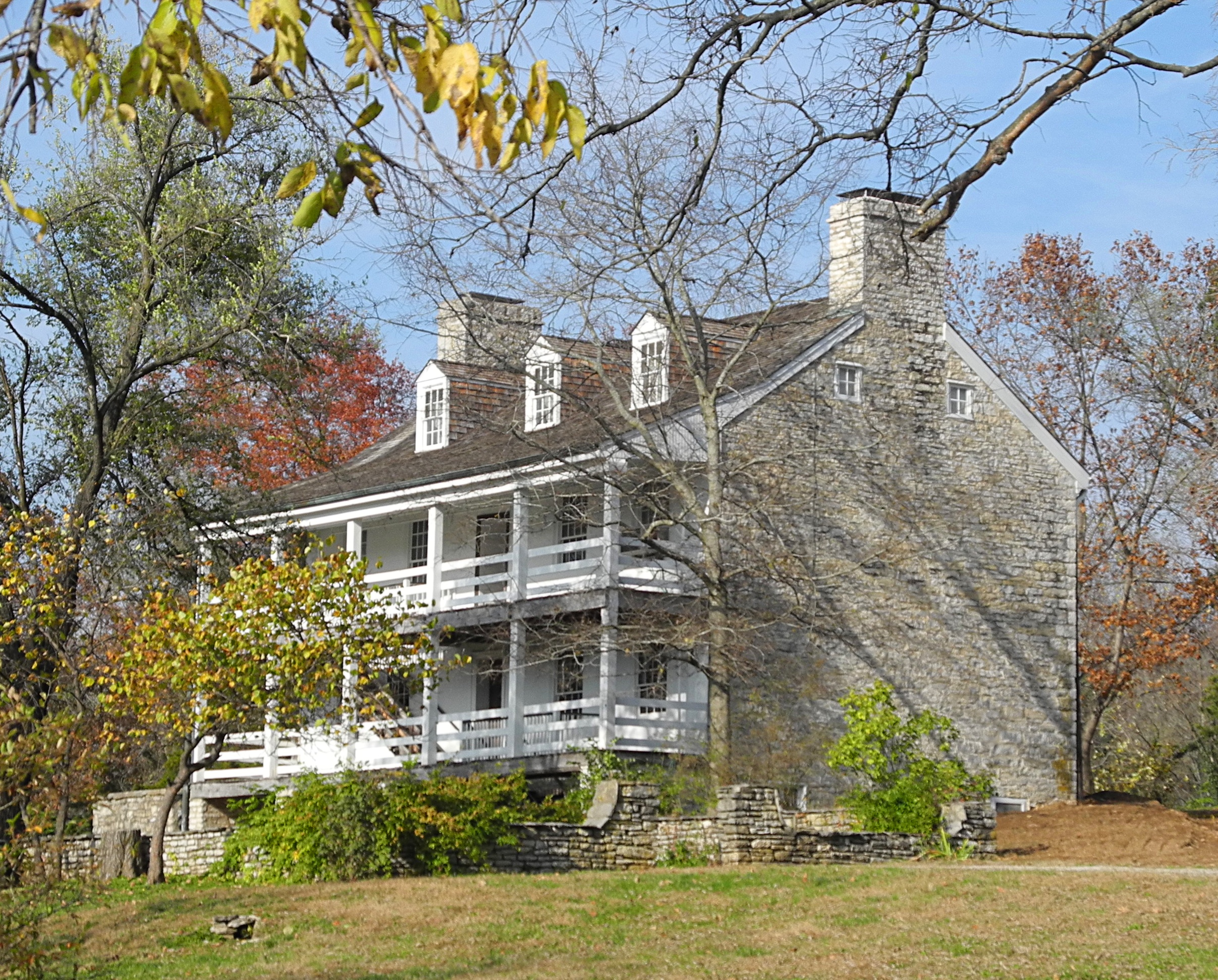

- Location within Missouri Location within the United States
- Location: Defiance, Missouri
- Coordinates: 38°39′6″N 90°51′14″W
- Architect: Boone Family
- Architectural style: Georgian
- NRHP reference No.: 73002175
- Added to NRHP: April 11, 1973

The Daniel Boone Home is a historic site in Defiance, Missouri, United States. The house was built by Daniel Boone's youngest son Nathan Boone, who lived there with his family until they moved further south in 1837. The Boones had moved there from Kentucky in late 1799. Nathan later said, "In the summer of 1800, I erected a good substantial log house, and several years after that I replaced it with a commodious stone building. My father, Daniel Boone, built himself a shop and had a set of tools, and when at home he would make and repair traps and guns. In fact he did all the needed smith work for the family and sometimes for neighbors to oblige them. But after a few years he disposed of his tools." Daniel and his wife Rebecca lived primarily with their son Nathan from at least 1804 to 1813, and then for much of the time from late 1816 to his death in 1820.

Daniel's move to Nathan's place is recorded in an official document from 1806 to the Federal Land Commission concerning Daniel's original (and unsettled) land grant: "Colonel D. Boone states to the Board, that, on his arrival in Louisiana, he took up his residence, with his lady, at his son Daniel M. Boone's, in the said district of Femme Osage, and adjoining the lands he now claims; that they remained there until about two years ago, when he moved to a younger son's, Nathan Boone, where he now lives. It is proved that the said claimant is of the age of about seventy years, and his wife about sixty-eight."

Daniel did at times visit the Callaway family near Marthasville, MO (the family of his daughter Jemima), and did so in the summer of 1820. Nathan describes the final events of Daniel's life, "During the whole summer of 1820, he was at the Callaway's. … He had an attack of fever, not severe, and while recovering was exceedingly anxious to be taken to my house. … Finally I took him back in a carriage…He died on the morning of September 26, 1820, about sunrise—the fourteenth day after his arrival here.”

The architecture of the home is Georgian style, and other various styles among the collection of 19th-century buildings that make up the adjacent Boonesfield Village.

The house was added to the National Register of Historic Places in 1973. In May 2016, the site was donated by Lindenwood University to St. Charles County. It was renamed the Historic Daniel Boone Home at Lindenwood Park and is operated by the county's Parks and Recreation Department.

== Park and tour hours ==
The park is open from 8:30 a.m. – 5 p.m. Monday–Saturday and 11:30 a.m. – 5 p.m. on Sunday. Guided tours are offered on the hour.

== Winter hours ==
Dec. 16 – Feb. 28

During winter hours, the park is open to self-guiders, but guided tours are only available on the weekend from 8:30 a.m. – 5 p.m. on Saturday, and 11:30 a.m. – 5 p.m. on Sunday.

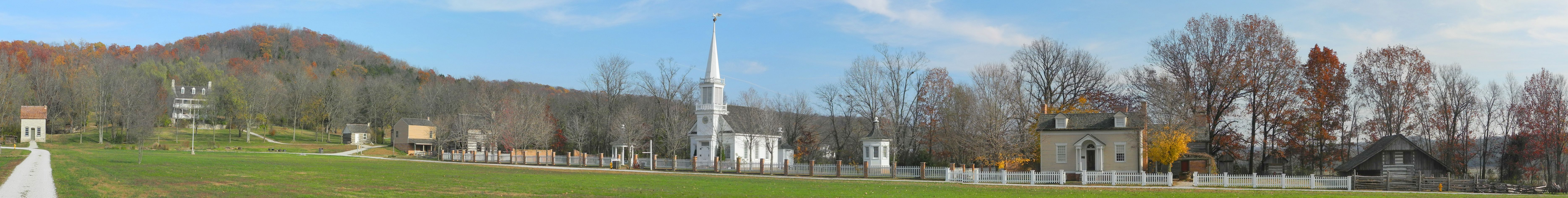
The Old Peace Chapel and other historic buildings have been relocated to create Boonesfield Village at the Daniel Boone Home historic site. In this panoramic image the Boone home sits on the hillside towards the left.

== See also ==
- List of the oldest buildings in Missouri
