= List of Missouri conservation areas – St. Louis region =

Map of Missouri conservation areas with the St. Louis region highlighted

The St. Louis administrative region of the Missouri Department of Conservation encompasses Crawford, Franklin, Jefferson, Lincoln, St. Charles, St. Louis, Warren, and Washington counties. The regional conservation office is in St. Charles.

Conservation Area	Description	Size		County	Location
Allenton Access	This area offers access to the Meramec River. There is a boat ramp.	9 acres	3.6 ha	St. Louis	38°28′25.29″N 90°39′37.81″W
Anderson (John N and Melba S) Memorial Conservation Area	From Steelville, take Hwy 19 south 2 miles (3.2 km), and turn east onto Valleyside Rd 1-mile (1.6 km) to the parking lot.	339 acres	137 ha	Crawford	37°55′0.24″N 91°18′8.47″W
Bellefontaine Conservation Area	Take Highway 367 south from I-270 approximately 1/2 mile to the entrance to the Missouri Veterans Home. Proceed east on the Veterans Home driveway to the entrance to the conservation area.	142 acres	57 ha	St. Louis	38°45′51.95″N 90°14′10.16″W
Bismarck Conservation Area	Facilities/features: boat ramp, fishing jetty, and DiSalvo Lake (210 acres).	1,160 acres	470 ha	St. Francois, Iron, Washington	37°43′37.62″N 90°38′18.68″W
Blanchette Landing Access	There is a boat ramp.	20 acres	8.1 ha	St. Charles	38°47′34.23″N 90°28′26.37″W
Blue Springs Creek Conservation Area	This area is mostly forest with grassland and old fields. Facilities/features: gravel boat ramp and 2 permanent streams (Blue Springs Creek, Meramec River).	856 acres	346 ha	Crawford	38°7′4.07″N 91°10′38.61″W
Bootleg Access	This forest area with old fields offers access to Big River. Facilities/features: primitive camping and viewing deck.	289 acres	117 ha	Washington	37°48′58.31″N 90°45′53.74″W
Brown's Ford Access	This area offers access to Big River. There is a boat ramp.	1.0 acre	0.40 ha	Jefferson	38°12′46.90″N 90°42′22.42″W
Buford Mountain Conservation Area	This is a forest area.	3,920 acres	1,590 ha	Iron, Washington	37°42′51.62″N 90°42′11.28″W
Busch (August A) Memorial Conservation Area	This 6,987-acre (28.28 km^{2}) area contains 3,000 acres (12 km^{2}) of forest in addition to grassland, cropland, old fields, prairie, and wetlands. Facilities/features: boat rentals, picnic areas, pavilion, hiking trails, 43 fishing jetties, fishing docks, staffed firearms range, archery range, five viewing blinds, and a visitor center.	7,007 acres	2,836 ha	St. Charles	38°42′35.04″N 90°44′26.18″W
Campbell Bridge Access	This area offers access to the Meramec River. There is a boat ramp and a canoe launch.	8 acres	3.2 ha	Crawford	38°4′56.05″N 91°9′0.86″W
Catawissa Conservation Area	This area is mostly forest and provides access to the Meramec River. There is a boat ramp.	216 acres	87 ha	Franklin	38°26′54.75″N 90°46′2.65″W
Chouteau Claim Access	This area offers access to the Meramec and Bourbeuse rivers. There is a boat ramp.	16 acres	6.5 ha	Franklin	38°23′52.82″N 90°53′26.04″W
Colter's Landing Access	This grassland area offers access to Boeuf Creek, which flows into the Missouri River. There is a boat ramp.	6 acres	2.4 ha	Franklin	38°35′20.24″N 91°9′45.45″W
Columbia Bottom Conservation Area	This area contains cropland, forest, wetlands, and old fields. There is a visitor center and office along with hiking and biking trails, interpretive sites and a boat ramp to the Missouri River. The unique feature of this area is the confluence of the Missouri and Mississippi rivers.	4,256 acres	1,722 ha	St. Louis	38°48′21.93″N 90°9′38.48″W
Crooked Creek Conservation Area	This is a forest area.	332 acres	134 ha	Crawford	37°51′24.30″N 91°24′33.48″W
Crouch (R H) Access	This provides walk-in fishing access to the West Fork of the Cuivre River.	3 acres	1.2 ha	Lincoln	39°1′45.94″N 91°1′27.08″W
Cuivre Island Conservation Area	This is a mostly forested area with old fields. Facilities/features: boat ramp and permanent stream (Mississippi River).	1,671 acres	676 ha	Lincoln, St. Charles	38°56′10.93″N 90°40′27.43″W
Daniel Boone Conservation Area	This is a predominantly forested area. Facilities/features: primitive camping, picnic area, 4 fishing ponds, and a multi-use trail.	3,616 acres	1,463 ha	Warren	38°46′37.32″N 91°22′50.03″W
Davidson (Claire Gempp) Memorial WA	This forest and grassland area has a small gazebo with a few benches.	13 acres	5.3 ha	St. Louis	38°32′28.27″N 90°22′53.70″W
Emmenegger Nature Park	This area, which features picnic areas and a pavilion, is just west of the Powder Valley Conservation Nature Center. It is leased by MDC to the city of Kirkwood.	117 acres	47 ha	St. Louis	38°33′3.48″N 90°26′0.22″W
Engelmann Woods Natural Area	This is a forest area. Facilities/features: old-growth forest with striking fall colors and spring wildflowers.	149 acres	60 ha	Franklin	38°33′59.98″N 90°46′36.12″W
Flamm City Access	There is a boat ramp on the Meramec River. This area is adjacent to Teszars Woods CA.	20 acres	8.1 ha	Jefferson	38°25′3.54″N 90°20′55.19″W
Forest 44 Conservation Area	This area is mostly forest with a staffed firearms range and a permanent stream (Williams Creek).	990 acres	400 ha	St. Louis	38°31′26.27″N 90°31′42.28″W
Glassberg Family Conservation Area	Glassberg Family CA is mostly forest with old fields in the LaBarque Creek watershed.	429 acres	174 ha	Jefferson	38°26′22″N 90°40′52″W
Goodson (Jean and Joan) Conservation Area	Goodson CA is also called Bittersweet Woods. Small tract of forest amongst St. Louis' suburban neighbors, it offers hiking and is connected with neighboring municipal parks. The area is leased to and maintained by City of Des Peres Parks and Recreation.	10 acres	4.0 ha	St. Louis	38°35′16.19″N 90°27′40.20″W
Gravois Creek Conservation Area	This is a forest area.	14 acres	5.7 ha	St. Louis	38°32′1.70″N 90°17′58.23″W
Hickory Woods Conservation Area	This is a forest area.	10 acres	4.0 ha	St. Louis	38°44′57.17″N 90°24′3.05″W
Howell Island Conservation Area	This island area is mostly forest surrounded by the Missouri River and Centaur Chute.	2,707 acres	1,095 ha	St. Louis, St. Charles	38°39′48.21″N 90°42′18.72″W
Hughes Mountain Natural Area	Half forest with glades, savanna, and old fields. Facilities/features: unique geological formations.	460 acres	190 ha	Washington	37°48′1.01″N 90°42′37.15″W
Huzzah Conservation Area	This area is predominantly forest. Facilities/features: primitive camping and 3 permanent streams (Meramec River, Courtois Creek, Huzzah Creek).	6,078 acres	2,460 ha	Crawford	38°2′18.31″N 91°12′19.62″W
Kessler Memorial WA	This area contains grassland, forest and some cropland.	155 acres	63 ha	Lincoln	39°3′50.85″N 90°54′37.77″W
Keysville Towersite	This forest area is 5 miles (8.0 km) south of Steelville on Route AA, then left on Tower Road.	81 acres	33 ha	Crawford	37°52′34.31″N 91°20′18.55″W
Kingston Access	This area offers access to Mineral Fork.	56 acres	23 ha	Washington	38°5′43.76″N 90°42′31.16″W
Klamberg (Roger) Woods Conservation Area	This is a forest area.	68 acres	28 ha	St. Louis	38°34′56.88″N 90°34′45.41″W
LaBarque Creek Conservation Area	The LaBarque watershed has a great variety of terrestrial natural communities, including small sandstone glades, acid seeps, forested fens and many kinds of woodland. Several neotropical migratory bird species depend on this large forest for breeding habitat.	570 acres	230 ha	Jefferson	38°24′59.69″N 90°42′23.04″W
Leach (B K) Memorial Conservation Area	This area borders the Mississippi River and contains wetlands, forest, and cropland. Facilities/features: waterfowl blinds, several fishable sloughs, and ponds.	4,322 acres	1,749 ha	Lincoln	39°8′6.90″N 90°43′33.18″W
Little Indian Creek Conservation Area	This is a forest area. Facilities/features: primitive camping, firearms range (includes shotgun), small fishing pond, and a permanent stream (Little Indian Creek).	3,890 acres	1,570 ha	Washington, Franklin	38°12′3.15″N 90°56′40.99″W
Little Lost Creek Conservation Area	This is a predominantly forested area with scattered glades, savannas, and fields. Facilities/features: primitive camping/picnicking, and a 7-mile (11 km) multi-use trail. Little Lost Creek is a partially spring-fed Ozark stream, characterized by clear water and a rocky stream bed. Brilliantly colored Ozark fish are found in the stream.	2,906 acres	1,176 ha	Warren	38°46′44.87″N 91°16′19.49″W
Logan (William R) Conservation Area	This area is mostly forest with a firearms range and several fishable ponds.	1,800 acres	730 ha	Lincoln	39°8′51.85″N 91°2′31.60″W
Long Ridge Conservation Area	This area contains forest and some savanna. Facilities/features: primitive camping and an intermittent stream (Little Spring Creek).	1,866 acres	755 ha	Franklin	38°17′10.83″N 91°10′3.78″W
Mammoth Access	This area offers access to Big River. There is a boat ramp.	4 acres	1.6 ha	Jefferson	38°7′15.78″N 90°40′34.47″W
Marais Temps Clair Conservation Area	This tract contains 500 acres (2.0 km^{2}) of wetlands in addition to cropland and some forest.	948 acres	384 ha	St. Charles	38°54′9.05″N 90°25′2.07″W
Mayers Landing Access	This grassland area offers access to the Bourbeuse River. There is a boat ramp.	7 acres	2.8 ha	Franklin	38°25′37.15″N 91°2′47.12″W
Meramec Conservation Area	This area is mainly forest. Facilities/features: viewing deck and a permanent stream (Meramec River).	3,938 acres	1,594 ha	Franklin	38°13′50.49″N 91°4′15.48″W
Merrill Horse Access	This area offers access to Big River. There is a boat ramp.	80 acres	32 ha	Jefferson	38°9′42.15″N 90°42′34.08″W
Mill Rock Access	It offers access to the Bourbeuse River.	9 acres	3.6 ha	Franklin	38°19′49.61″N 91°18′8.59″W
Mint Spring Access	Offers access to the Bourbeuse River.	7 acres	2.8 ha	Crawford, Gasconade	38°12′30.83″N 91°32′4.94″W
Onyx Cave Conservation Area	There is a permanent steam (Brazil Creek).	38 acres	15 ha	Crawford	38°6′42.00″N 91°8′15.94″W
Pacific Palisades Conservation Area	This area contains forest, cropland, and old fields. Facilities/features: a permanent stream (Meramec River) and sand and gravel pits which provide seasonal fishing.	732 acres	296 ha	Jefferson, St. Louis	38°28′33.74″N 90°43′29.43″W
Pea Ridge Conservation Area	This area is mostly forest. It contains Hi Pointe Lake (2 acres, fishable).	8,642 acres	3,497 ha	Washington	38°4′15.06″N 90°56′27.58″W
Pelican Island Access	Pelican Island Access is open during normal hours of operation for Sioux Passage Park except that boaters who wish to remain on the river past normal park hours may exit the area through an electronic gate. Normal park hours are 7 a.m. to one half hour after sunset.	43 acres	17 ha	St. Louis	38°51′33.81″N 90°16′17.86″W
Pelican Island Natural Area	In North St. Louis County, near Sioux Passage Park on the Missouri River. Public access is by boat only.	2,571 acres	1,040 ha	St. Louis	38°52′30.41″N 90°18′3.19″W
Phantom Forest Conservation Area	Phantom Forest CA is leased to and maintained by the City of Des Peres Parks and Recreation.	14 acres	5.7 ha	St. Louis	38°35′7.82″N 90°27′54.50″W
Port Hudson Lake Conservation Area	This area contains forest, old fields and grassland. Facilities/features: boat ramp, boat dock, picnic area, pavilion, fishing dock, and Port Hudson Community Lake (55 acres).	225 acres	91 ha	Franklin	38°28′19.93″N 91°16′0.61″W
Powder Valley Conservation Nature Center	This is a forested area with hiking trails. The nature center has 2 floors of interactive exhibits.	116 acres	47 ha	St. Louis	38°33′14.41″N 90°25′33.33″W
Prairie Slough Conservation Area	This forest and wetlands tract contains Prairie Sough Natural Area, a wet-mesic bottomland forest.	610 acres	250 ha	Lincoln, Pike	39°12′45.72″N 90°44′29.89″W
Redhorse Access	This area offers access to the Meramec River. There is a boat ramp.	46 acres	19 ha	Franklin	38°16′48.30″N 90°56′4.14″W
Reifsnider (Frank) State Forest	This is a forest area. Facilities/features: picnic area, firearms range, Reifsnider Forest Natural Area (22 acres of mature white oak forest), and an intermittent stream (North Fork of Charette Creek). There are also a couple of old clay mining pits which are stocked for fishing.	1,378 acres	558 ha	Warren	38°46′56.65″N 91°6′42.43″W
Reiker Ford Access	This is a forest area offering access to the Bourbeuse River.	7 acres	2.8 ha	Franklin	38°22′47.44″N 91°4′26.71″W
River 'Round Conservation Area	This area is about 1/2 forest with cropland and old fields. It offers access to the Meramec River. There is a boat ramp.	314 acres	127 ha	Franklin	38°21′13.69″N 90°52′18.00″W
Riverview Access	This area offers access to the Meramec River. There is a boat ramp.	4 acres	1.6 ha	Crawford	37°59′30.98″N 91°25′33.14″W
Rockwoods Range	From Interstate 44 west of St. Louis, take exit 261 (Allenton-Six Flags), then go north on Allenton Road and take an immediate left on Fox Creek; stay on Fox Creek for 2 miles (3.2 km).	1,393 acres	564 ha	St. Louis	38°31′14.57″N 90°41′57.87″W
Rockwoods Reservation	This is a predominantly forest area. Facilities/features: picnic areas and a pavilion, hiking trails, viewing blind, and a permanent stream (Hamilton Creek). The area also has a Conservation Education Center.	1,924 acres	779 ha	St. Louis	38°33′37.29″N 90°39′34.07″W
Sand Ford Access	This 30-acre (120,000 m^{2}) area offers access to the Meramec River. There are 2 boat ramps.	33 acres	13 ha	Franklin	38°15′13.67″N 91°4′46.98″W
Sandy Island Conservation Area	This is a forest area on the Mississippi River.	385 acres	156 ha	Lincoln	39°1′40.28″N 90°42′36.80″W
Sappington Bridge Access	This area offers access to the Meramec River. There is a boat ramp and a canoe launch.	9 acres	3.6 ha	Crawford	38°9′27.86″N 91°6′31.43″W
Scotts Ford Access	This forest area offers access to the Meramec River.	30 acres	12 ha	Crawford	37°58′46.98″N 91°27′29.04″W
Sizemore (Pearl G and John J) Memorial Conservation Area	From Steelville, go 2 miles (3.2 km) south on Highway 19, then east-southeast (left) on Valleyside Road 2.5 miles (4.0 km).	180 acres	73 ha	Crawford	37°54′27.76″N 91°16′40.18″W
Teszars Woods Conservation Area	This forest area is adjacent to the Meramec River.	93 acres	38 ha	Jefferson	38°24′31.69″N 90°21′8.50″W
Truman Access	This area offers access to the Mississippi River. There is a boat ramp.	20 acres	8.1 ha	Jefferson	38°8′12.68″N 90°16′6.43″W
Uhlemeyer (Dr Henry A and Amalia) Access	This forest and grassland area offers access to the Bourbeuse River. There is a boat ramp.	12 acres	4.9 ha	Franklin	38°26′22.11″N 90°54′22.15″W
Union Access	Offers access to the Bourbeuse River. There is a boat ramp.	10 acres	4.0 ha	Franklin	38°26′33.54″N 90°59′41.64″W
Upper Mississippi Conservation Area	These tracts are mostly forest along with old fields and wetlands. The area contains waterfowl blinds and Westport Island Natural Area, which is a bottomland wet-mesic forest.	13,079 acres	5,293 ha	Lincoln, Lewis, St. Charles, Pike	39°13′33.46″N 90°46′2.10″W
Valley View Glades Natural Area	This dolomite glade is a Designated Natural Area.	212 acres	86 ha	Jefferson	38°15′30.94″N 90°37′31.68″W
Victoria Glades Conservation Area	This area consists of glades and forest.	239 acres	97 ha	Jefferson	38°12′6.80″N 90°33′0.33″W
Vonaventure Memorial Forest and WA	This is a forest area with a small pond.	203 acres	82 ha	Lincoln	39°8′23.06″N 91°3′37.22″W
Weldon Spring Conservation Area	This is a mostly forested area with pasture, cropland, and some wetlands and glades. Facilities/features: boat ramp (on the river), hiking trails, fishable lakes and ponds (51 acres total), and a permanent stream (Missouri River).	8,359 acres	3,383 ha	St. Charles	38°39′53.17″N 90°44′7.62″W
Wenkel Ford Access	This forest area offers access to the Bourbeuse River.	5 acres	2.0 ha	Franklin	38°19′21.05″N 91°15′26.97″W
White (William G and Erma Parke) Memorial WA	Facilities/features: boat ramp, fishing jetty, fishable ponds, Lake Whiteside, and a managed dove hunt.	821 acres	332 ha	Lincoln	39°10′36.36″N 91°0′44.16″W
Woods (Woodson K) Memorial Conservation Area	This area is predominantly forest. Facilities/features: gravel bar boat launch (no concrete ramp) and 2 permanent streams (Dry Fork Creek, Meramec River).	5,739 acres	2,322 ha	Phelps, Crawford	37°57′42.42″N 91°30′59.84″W
Young Conservation Area	This area is mostly forest with prairie and old fields. Facilities/features: a permanent stream (LaBarque Creek).	969 acres	392 ha	Jefferson	38°26′25.73″N 90°39′47.99″W

== Notes ==
- Acreage and counties from MDCLand GIS file
- Names, descriptions, and locations from Conservation Atlas Online GIS file
