= Henry Shaw Ozark Corridor =

Conservation areas in Missouri, United States

The Henry Shaw Ozark Corridor is a long string of adjoining conservation areas in the US state of Missouri, running 24 miles (39 km) along Interstate 44 and 40 miles (64 km) along the Meramec River. The corridor is named after Henry Shaw, founder of the Missouri Botanical Garden.

The Henry Shaw Ozark Corridor Foundation is an organization founded officially in 1994 to preserve the Ozark foothills along Interstate 44 and promote maintenance and expansion of the Ozark Corridor series of parks.

Protected areas in the Henry Shaw Ozark Corridor include:

- Allenton Access
- Antire Valley County Park
- Beaumont Scout Reservation
- Buder Park
- Castlewood State Park
- Catawissa Conservation Area
- Emmenegger Nature Park
- Forest 44 Conservation Area
- Forest Staley County Park
- George Winter Park
- Greensfelder County Park
- Greentree Park
- LaBarque Creek Conservation Area
- Lone Elk County Park
- Myron and Sonya Glassberg Family Conservation Area
- Pacific Palisades Conservation Area
- Packwood Park
- Possum Woods Conservation Area
- Powder Valley Conservation Nature Center
- Riverside Park
- Robertsville State Park
- Rockwoods Range Conservation Area
- Rockwoods Reservation
- Route 66 State Park
- Simpson Park
- Shaw Nature Reserve
- Tyson Research Center
- Unger Park
- West Tyson County Park
- Young Conservation Area
