= Rockwoods Range Conservation Area =

Protected land in Missouri, U.S.

- IUCN category IV (habitat/species management area)
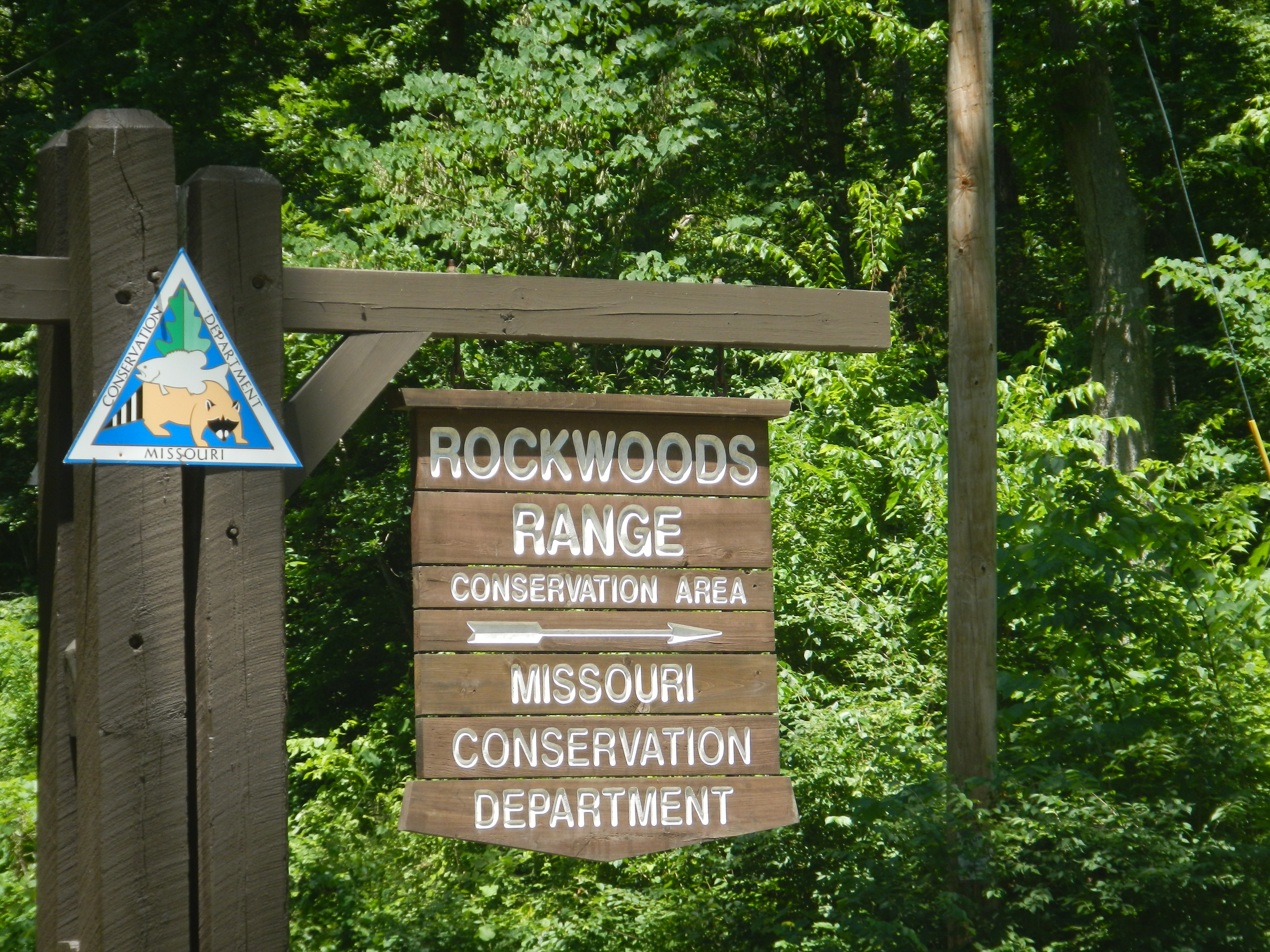

- Location within Missouri
- Location: St. Louis County, Missouri, United States
- Nearest city: Eureka, MO
- Coordinates: 38°31′11″N 90°41′30″W
- Area: 1,388 acres (5.6 km^{2})
- Established: 1943
- Governing body: Missouri Department of Conservation
- Website: Official website

Rockwoods Range Conservation Area consists of 1,388 acres (5.62 km^{2}) in western St. Louis County, Missouri. It is just north of Interstate 44 west of Eureka. The land is part of the Henry Shaw Ozark Corridor.

Most of the land was donated to the Missouri Department of Conservation in 1943 by A.P. Greensfelder to preserve it in public ownership. A memorial in the conservation area denotes the location of Greensfelder's large summer cottage.

Limestone rock outcroppings and sinkholes are common in the area, and it has been designated as an Important Bird Area by the Missouri Audubon Society. The area supports good populations of white-tailed deer, raccoons, and squirrels.

Young Conservation Area is open daily from sunrise to one half-hour after sunset. Activities include hiking, wildlife watching, mountain biking, horseback riding, and hunting (in season). Nearby Missouri Department of Conservation areas include Rockwoods Reservation, Young, Forest 44, Pacific Palisades, Allenton Access, and August A. Busch. Greensfelder County Park abuts Rockwoods Range on the east.

There are four trails in the area. The Green Rock Trail is for hiking only, but the other three are multi-use.

- Round House Loop Trail - 3.0 miles (4.8 km)
- Fox Creek Spur Trail - 0.6 miles (0.97 km)
- Fox Run Trail - 3.5 miles (5.6 km)
- Green Rock Trail - 2.9 miles (4.7 km) out of 14.5 miles (23.3 km) total length
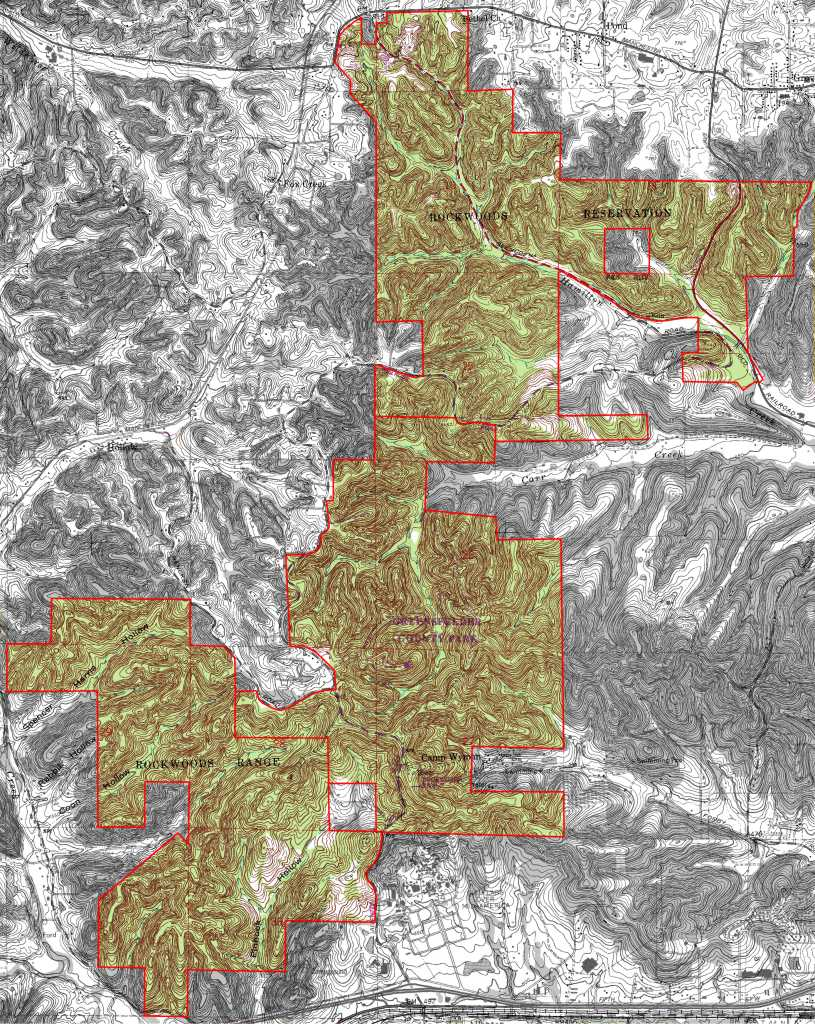
Map of Rockwoods Range, Greensfelder County Park, and Rockwoods Reservation

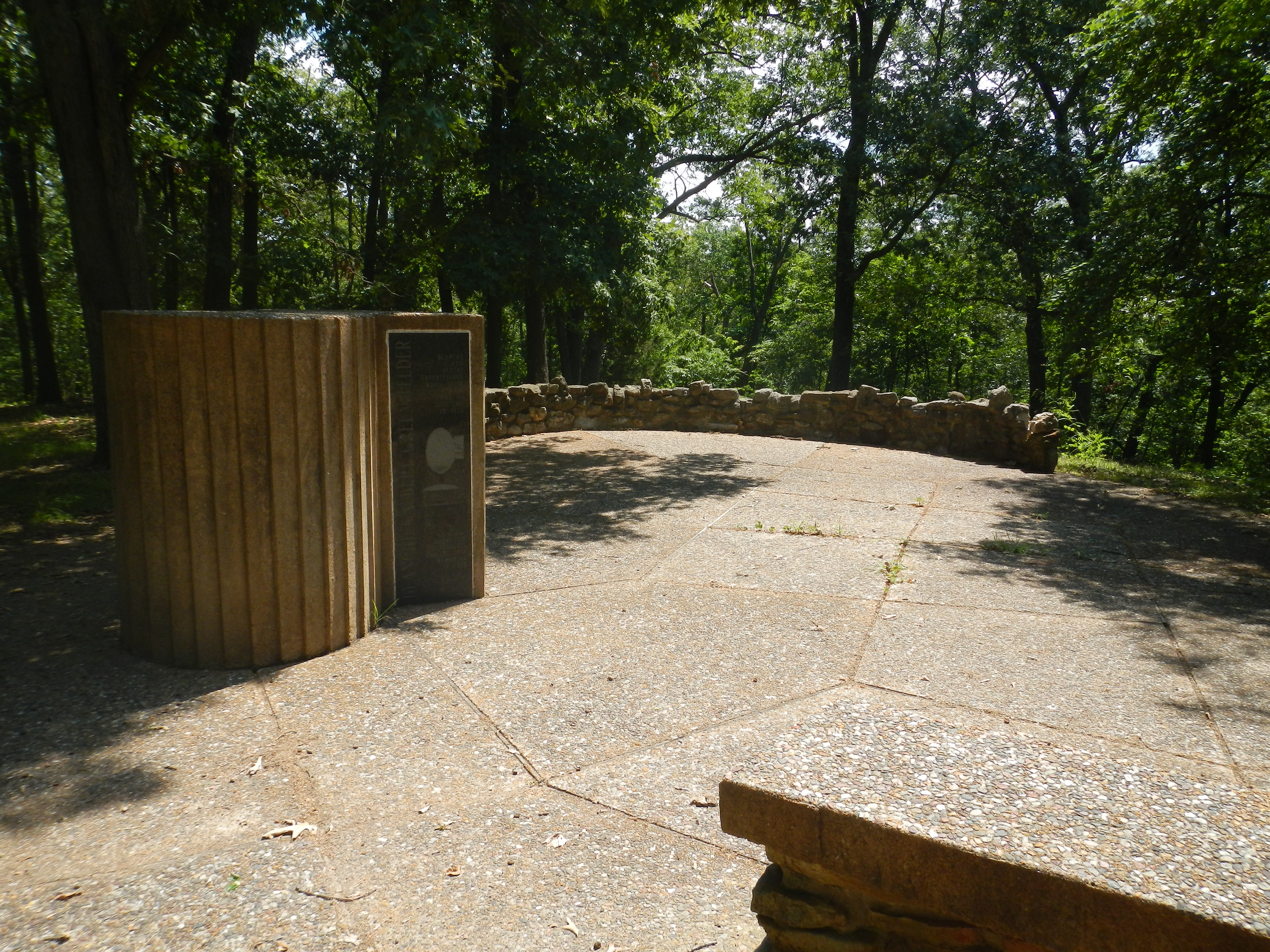
Roundhouse Memorial

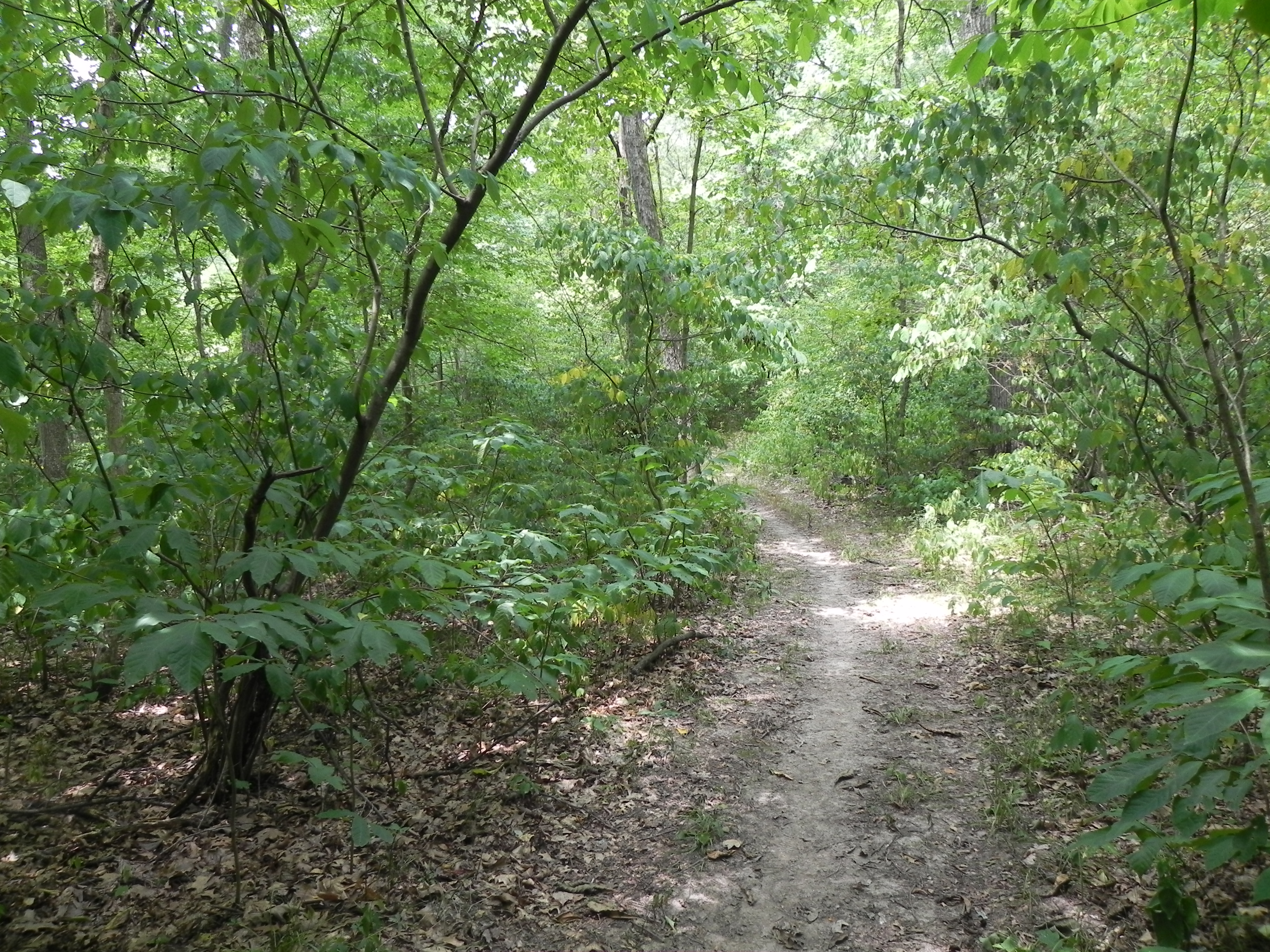
Fox Run Trail
