= Young Conservation Area =

Protected land in Missouri, U.S.

- IUCN category IV (habitat/species management area)
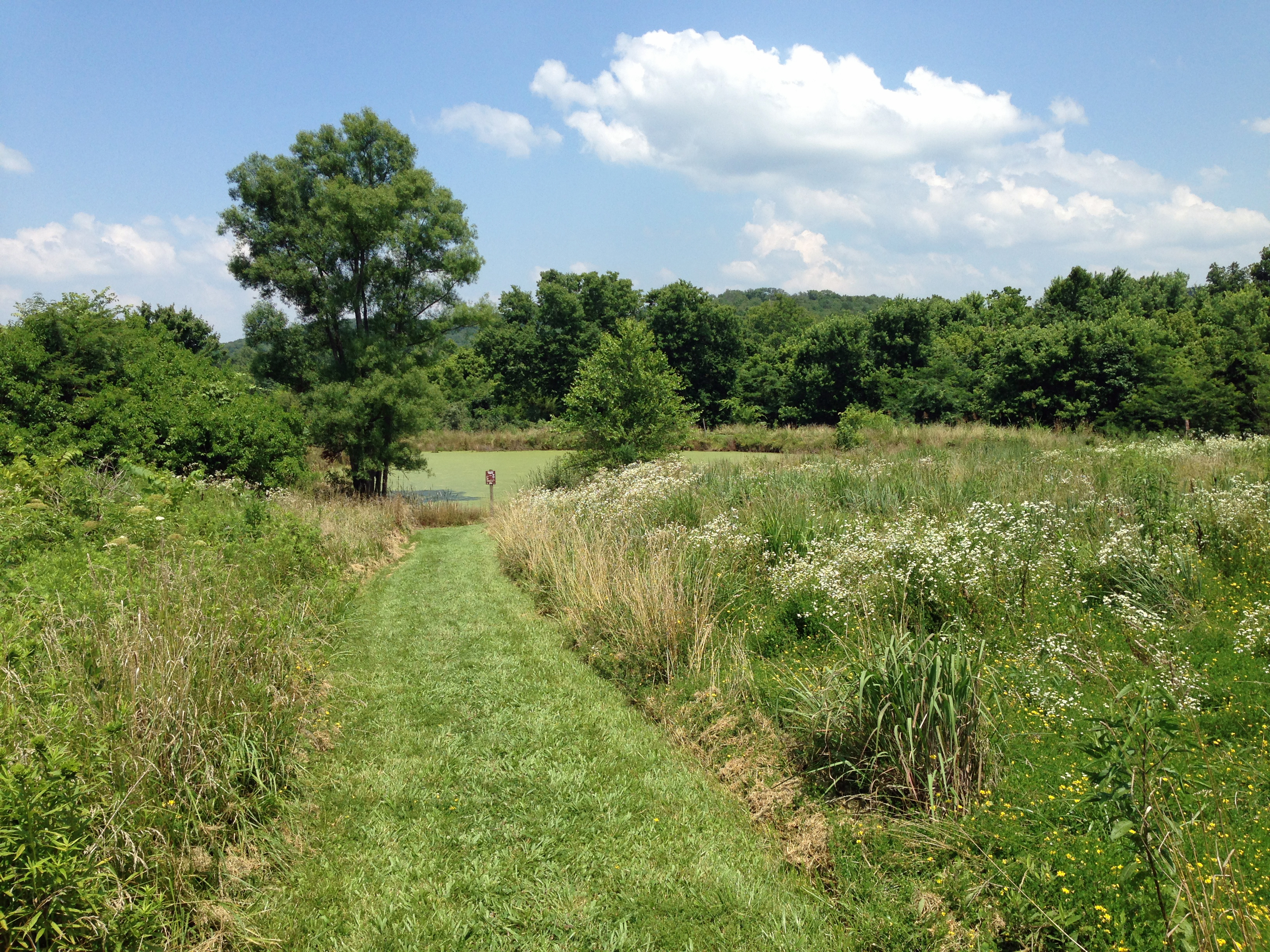
- A pond in the Young Conservation Area

- Location within Missouri
- Location: Jefferson County, Missouri, United States
- Nearest city: Eureka, MO
- Coordinates: 38.438°N 90.656°W
- Area: 970 acres (3.9 km^{2})
- Established: 1986
- Governing body: Missouri Department of Conservation
- Website: Official website

Young Conservation Area, formerly named Hilda Young Conservation Area, consisting of 970 acres (3.9 km^{2}), is located in the north central portion of Jefferson County, Missouri.

== Geography ==
The property is about 3 miles (4.8 km) west of County Highway W along Highway FF between LaBarque Creek and John McKeever Road.

== History ==
The area was acquired through a donation and purchase by the Missouri Department of Conservation in 1986.

== Features ==
The area is about 93 percent forested with oak, maple, hickory, and other native species. White-tailed deer, wild turkeys, and squirrels are abundant. LaBarque Creek, glades, tree plantations, and open fields provide diverse wildlife habitat.

The plantations on the area include a 3.5-acre (14,000 m^{2}) Austrian pine grove and a 3.5-acre (14,000 m^{2}) black walnut grove.

The 2.5-mile (4.0 km) Taconic Loop Trail winds along LaBarque Creek, and there are two man-made fishing ponds stocked with bass and bluegill. Hunting is permitted. Bow hunting is permitted in season. Single-projectile firearms are not allowed.

Young Conservation Area is open daily from 4:00 a.m. to 10:00 p.m. The area is recommended for hunting, fishing, nature study, outdoor photography, picnicking and frogging (in season). Free-running pets are not allowed. No camping, horseback riding, target shooting, open fires, or swimming is permitted.

== Nearby attractions ==
Nearby Missouri Department of Conservation areas include LaBarque Creek, Myron and Sonya Glassberg Family Conservation Area, Rockwoods Reservation, Rockwoods Range, Forest 44, Pacific Palisades Conservation Area, Allenton Access, Catawissa Conservation Area, and August A. Busch Memorial Conservation Area.

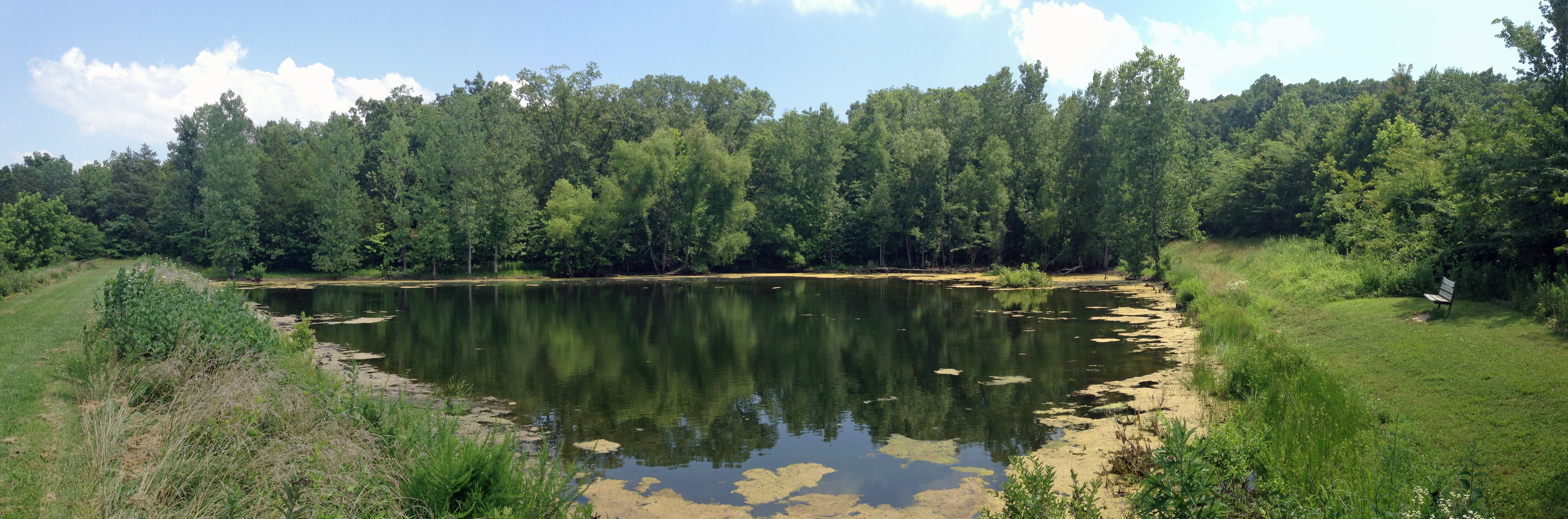
A pond in Young Conservation Area
