= Hobo (disambiguation) =

A hobo is a migratory worker or homeless vagabond, often penniless.

Hobo may also refer to:

== Arts and entertainment ==
- Hobo (book), an autobiographical book by Eddy Joe Cotton
- The Hobo, a 1917 film starring Oliver Hardy
- Hobo (band), a Yugoslav rock band
- The Hobos, a rock band from Latvia
- Hobo (Billy Bob Thornton album) (2005), the third album by Billy Bob Thornton
- Hobo (Charlie Winston album) (2009), the second album by Charlie Winston
- Hobo, a character in the Indian television series Hatim
- Hobo, a series of Adobe Flash games published by Armor Games

== People ==
- Percy Hobart (1885–1957), British major-general nicknamed "Hobo"
- Hobo Jim (born 1952), American folk singer-songwriter
- Hobo Johnson, American vocalist and frontman of Hobo Johnson and the LoveMakers

== Military ==
- Hobo, callsign of VFA-94, a United States Navy fighter squadron
- USS Hobo II (SP-783), a United States Navy patrol boat in commission from 1917 to 1919

== Places ==
- Hobo, Huila, a town and municipality in Colombia
- Hobo Station (Mie), a railway station in Yokkaichi, Mie Prefecture, Japan
- Hobo Branch, a stream in Missouri, United States

== Other uses ==
- Hobo bag, a style of handbag
- Hobo (typeface), a sans serif typeface
- Hobo spider, Eratigena agrestis
- Hobo (The Littlest Hobo), title character of The Littlest Hobo
- Hendy Hobo, a British monoplane built in 1929 by the Hendy Aircraft Company
- Hobo Railroad, part of the Plymouth & Lincoln Railroad, in New Hampshire, United States
