= List of Missouri conservation areas =

Administrative regions used by the Conservation Department as of 2010

The Missouri Department of Conservation (MDC) administers over a thousand conservation areas in all counties of the state, totaling nearly one million acres. Most areas are owned by the department; some are leased by the department; some areas are managed under contract by the department; and some areas are leased to other entities for management. The department has divided the counties of the state into eight administrative regions to locally manage these lands and provide conservation services to the public.

The headquarters for the Conservation Commission is in Jefferson City

== Central ==

The Central Region encompasses these counties:

- Audrain
- Boone
- Callaway
- Camden
- Cole
- Cooper
- Gasconade
- Howard
- Maries
- Miller
- Montgomery
- Moniteau
- Morgan
- Osage
- Saline

The regional office is in Columbia.

== Kansas City Area ==

The Kansas City Region encompasses these counties:

- Bates
- Benton
- Cass
- Clay
- Henry
- Jackson
- Johnson
- Lafayette
- Pettis
- Platte
- St. Clair
- Vernon

The regional conservation office is in Lee's Summit.

== Northeast ==

The Northeast region encompasses these counties:

- Adair
- Clark
- Knox
- Lewis
- Macon
- Marion
- Monroe
- Pike
- Putnam
- Ralls
- Randolph
- Schuyler
- Scotland
- Shelby
- Sullivan

The regional conservation office is in Kirksville.

== Northwest ==

The Northwest Region encompasses these counties:

- Andrew
- Atchison
- Buchanan
- Caldwell
- Carroll
- Chariton
- Clinton
- Daviess
- DeKalb
- Gentry
- Grundy
- Harrison
- Holt
- Linn
- Livingston
- Mercer
- Nodaway
- Ray
- Worth

The regional conservation office is in St. Joseph.

== Ozark ==

The Ozark Region encompasses these counties:

- Carter
- Dent
- Douglas
- Howell
- Oregon
- Ozark
- Phelps
- Pulaski
- Ripley
- Shannon
- Texas
- Wright

The regional conservation office is in West Plains.

== Southeast ==

The Southeast Region encompasses these counties:

- Bollinger
- Butler
- Cape Girardeau
- Dunklin
- Iron
- Madison
- Mississippi
- New Madrid
- Pemiscot
- Perry
- Reynolds
- Scott
- Ste. Genevieve
- St. Francois
- Stoddard
- Wayne

The regional conservation office is in Cape Girardeau.

== Southwest ==

The Southwest Region encompasses these counties:

- Barry
- Barton
- Cedar
- Christian
- Dade
- Dallas
- Greene
- Hickory
- Jasper
- Laclede
- Lawrence
- McDonald
- Newton
- Polk
- Stone
- Taney
- Webster

The regional conservation office is in Springfield.

== St. Louis Area ==

The St. Louis Region encompasses these counties:

- Crawford
- Franklin
- Jefferson
- Lincoln
- St. Charles
- St. Louis
- Warren
- Washington

The regional conservation office is in St. Charles.
