= Hobo Branch =

Stream in the American state of Missouri

Hobo Branch is a stream in Crawford County in the U.S. state of Missouri. It is a tributary of Blue Springs Creek within the Blue Springs Creek Conservation Area.

The stream headwaters arise at 38°05′48″N 91°11′58″W and it flows to the northeast passing under Missouri Route N just south of its confluence with Blue Springs Creek at 38°06′56″N 91°10′55″W. The confluence is at an elevation of 636 ft (194 m) and located about four miles southeast of Bourbon.

Hobo Branch took its name from a nearby mine, the Hobo Sulphur and Iron Mines, where it was claimed hoboes worked.
