= Pacific Palisades =

Pacific Palisades may refer to:

== Places ==
- Pacific Palisades, Los Angeles, a neighborhood, Los Angeles, California, US
- Pacific Palisades Conservation Area, a region near Pacific, Missouri, US
- Pacific Palisades, a suburban neighborhood, Pearl City, Oʻahu, Hawaiʻi, US

== Film and television ==
- Pacific Palisades (TV series), 1997, set in Pacific Palisades, Los Angeles, US
- Pacific Palisades (film), 1990, set in Pacific Palisades, Los Angeles, US
