= LaBarque Creek Conservation Area =

Protected land in Missouri, U.S.

- IUCN category IV (habitat/species management area)
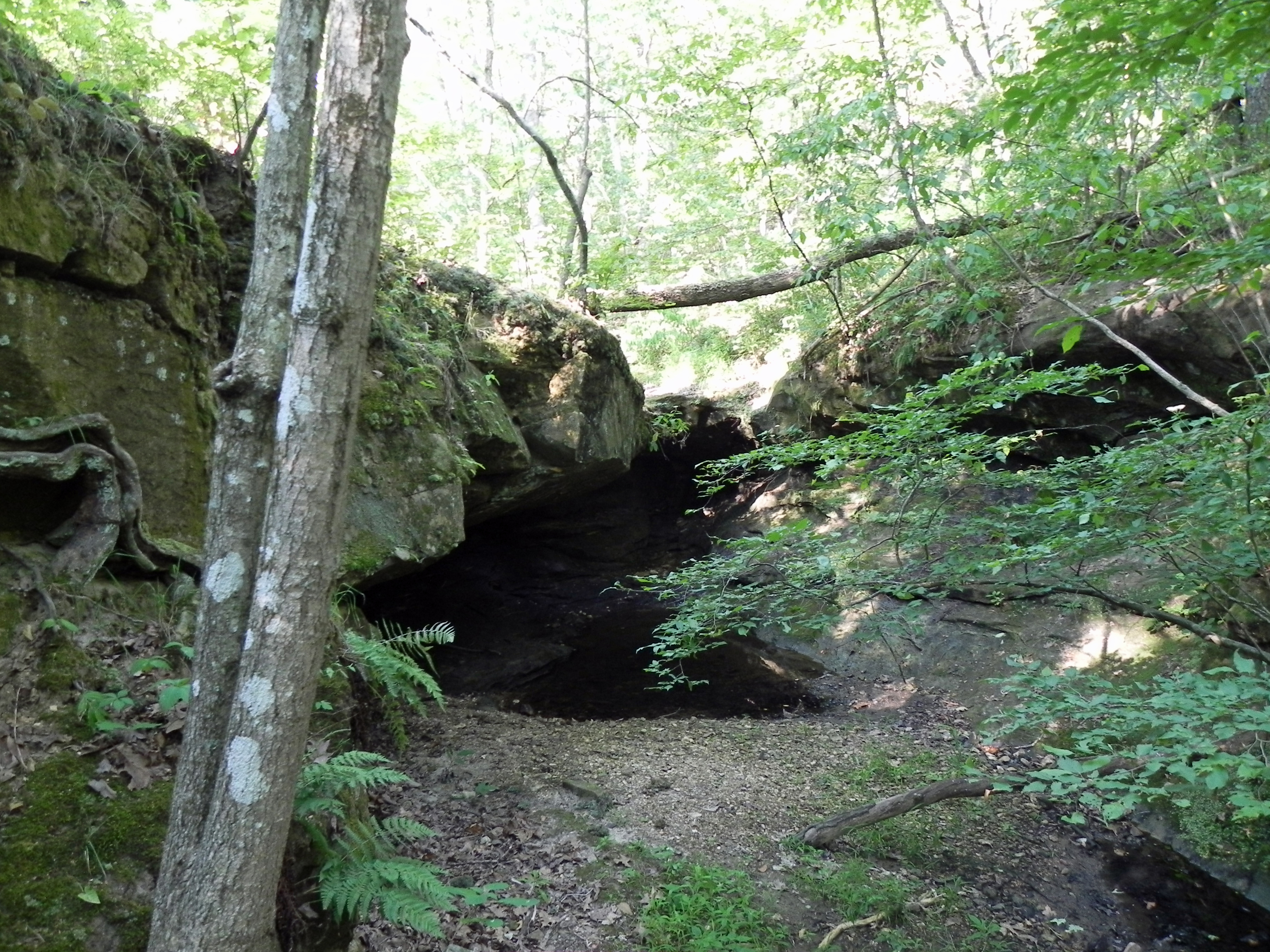

- Location within Missouri
- Location: Jefferson County, Missouri, United States
- Nearest city: Pacific, MO
- Coordinates: 38°25′00″N 90°42′23″W
- Area: 1,274 acres (5.2 km^{2})
- Established: 2005
- Governing body: Missouri Department of Conservation
- Website: Official website

LaBarque Creek Conservation Area (LCCA) consists of 1,274 acres (5.16 km^{2}) in northwestern Jefferson County, Missouri. The LCCA is part of the Henry Shaw Ozark Corridor. LaBarque Creek is the prominent stream in the conservation area and subsequently flows into the Meramec River shortly after leaving the park.

== History ==
In 2005 the Missouri Department of Conservation purchased 545 acres (221 ha) from The Nature Conservancy and a private landowner. Other acquisitions brought the total acreage to 639 acres (259 ha), and it opened to public use on November 15, 2007. In December 2010, these 639 acres (259 ha) became a part of the Missouri Natural Areas System as LaBarque Creek Natural Area. Three adjacent parcels of land totaling a combined 635 acres (257 ha) were added to LCCA, bringing its total area to 1,274 acres (516 ha) and connected it to land that will become Don Robinson State Park to the south, forming a 2,117-acre (857 ha) block of public protected land. None of the more recently acquired land is part of the designated natural area.

== Ecology ==
The LaBarque watershed has a great variety of terrestrial natural communities, including small sandstone glades, forested fens and many kinds of woodland. There are at least 54 fish species in LaBarque Creek; it is distinguished by its biodiversity among the tributaries of the Meramec River.

== Recreation ==
The LCCA has a 3 mi (4.8 km) loop trail on its eastern side open to hiking only. The LCCA is open to archery deer hunting only.

== Geography ==
The LaBarque Creek Conservation Area is about 5 mi (8.0 km) southeast of city of Pacific and 5 mi (8.0 km) northwest of Cedar Hill. Several other conservation areas are in LCCA's vicinity. The Young Conservation Area is about 2 miles (3.2 km) to the east, Myron and Sonya Glassberg Family Conservation Area is 1.2 mi (1.9 km) to the northeast, Pacific Palisades Conservation Area is 3.3 miles (5.3 km) to the north, Catawissa Conservation Area is 3.5 miles (5.6 km) northwest, and Robertsville State Park is 4.7 miles (7.6 km) west.
