= ENP =

ENP may refer to:

- Egyptian National Police
- Electroless nickel plating
- Emergency Nurse Practitioner
- Emergency Number Professional
- Emmenegger Nature Park, in Missouri
- English National Party
- Escuela Nacional Preparatoria, a high school system in Mexico
- European Neighbourhood Policy
- Effective number of parties
