= Possum Woods Conservation Area =

Protected land in Missouri, U.S.

- IUCN category IV (habitat/species management area)
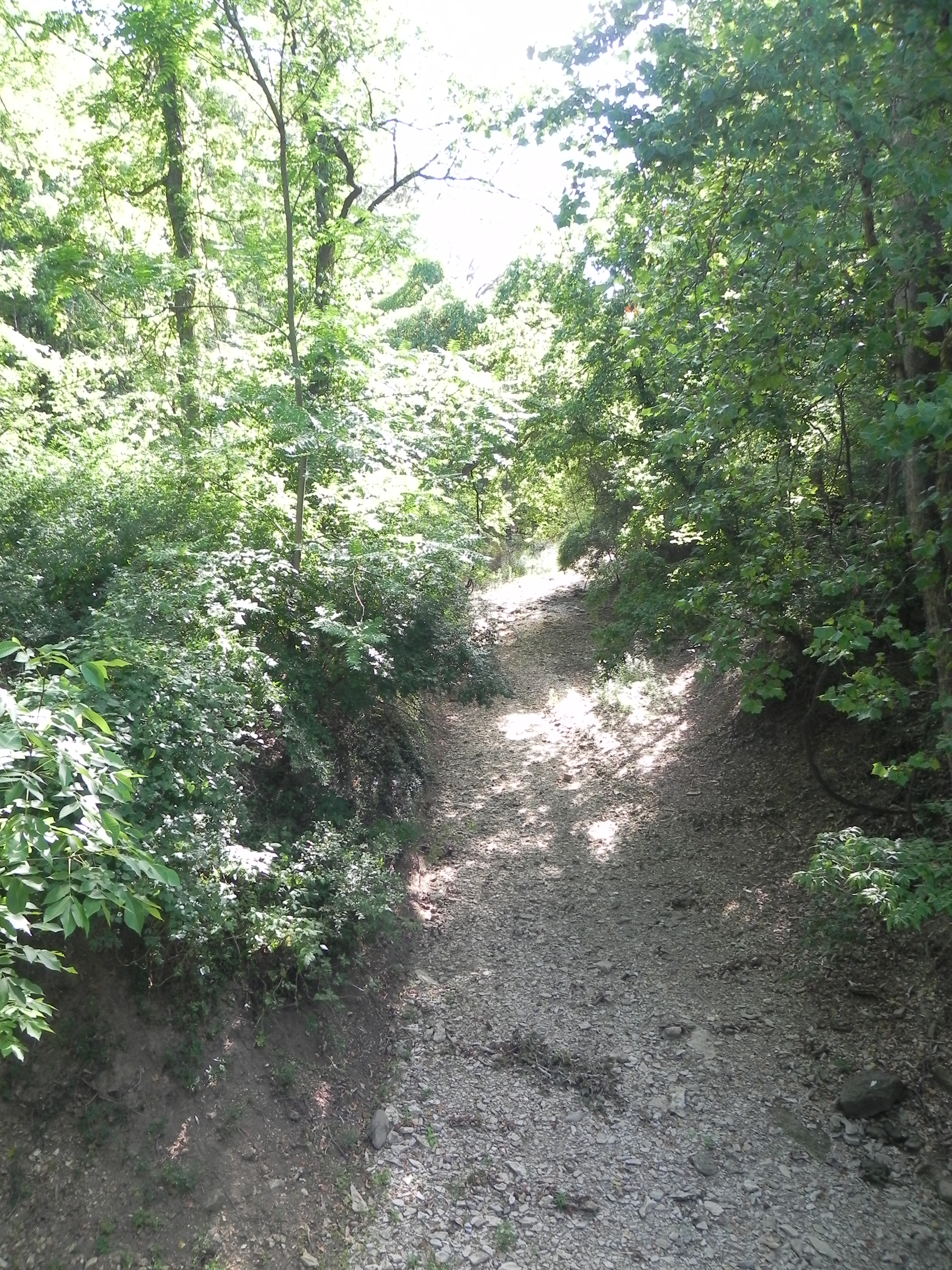

- Location within Missouri
- Location: St. Louis County, Missouri, United States
- Nearest city: Kirkwood, MO
- Coordinates: 38°32′52″N 90°25′51″W
- Area: 15 acres (0.1 km^{2})
- Governing body: Missouri Department of Conservation
- Website: Official website

Possum Woods Conservation Area consists of 15 acres (0.061 km^{2}) in St. Louis County, Missouri. It is located in the city of Kirkwood at the intersection of Interstates 44 and 270. It is adjacent to Emmenegger Nature Park along the Meramec River and part of the Meramec Greenway and Henry Shaw Ozark Corridor.

The area had been used at various times as an exotic animal breeding area for the St. Louis Zoo, a resort, public swimming pool, and tennis club. The land was purchased by real estate developer Russell. E. Emmenegger in the 1970s before he donated it to the city of Kirkwood. The land is currently leased by the Missouri Department of Conservation. Dogs are allowed on a 6 ft (1.8 m) leash.
