= Greensfelder County Park =

Park in Missouri, United States

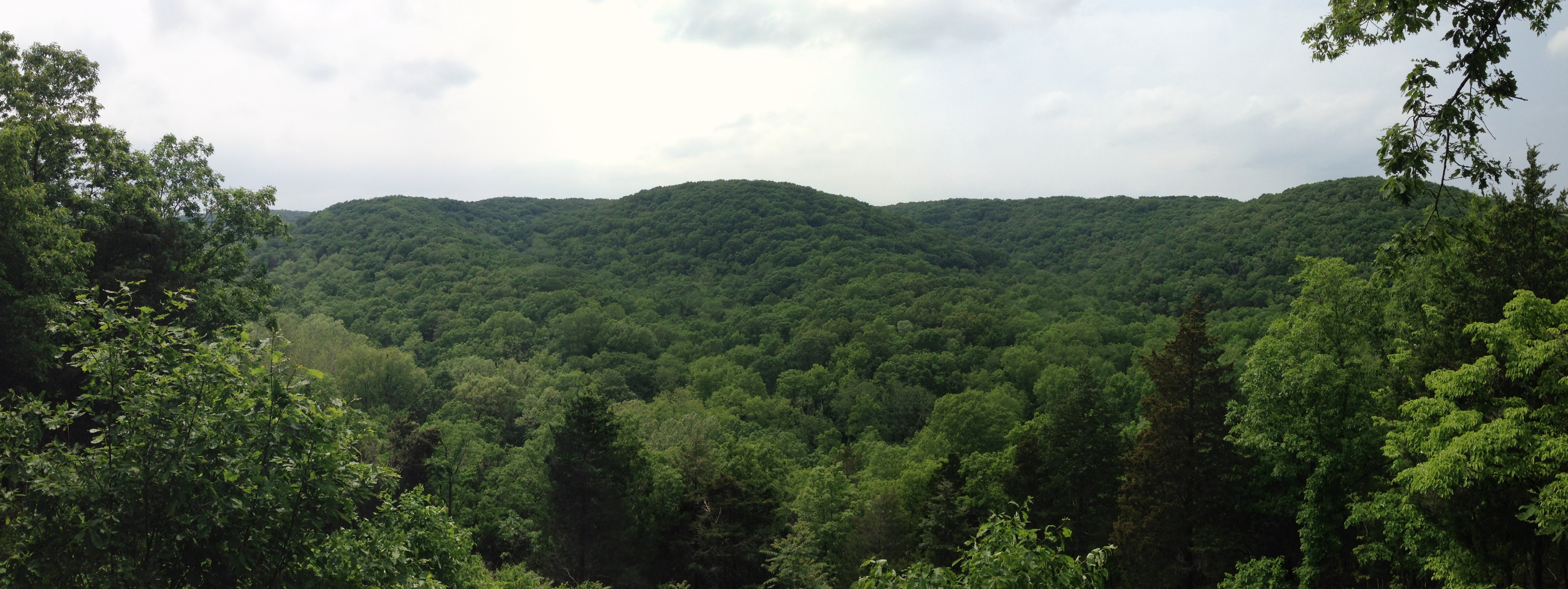
- View from the overlook in Greensfelder County Park

- Location within Missouri
- Location: St. Louis County, Missouri, United States
- Nearest city: Wildwood, MO
- Coordinates: 38.5342201°N 90.6751279°W
- Area: 1,734 acres (7.0 km^{2})
- Established: 1963
- Governing body: St. Louis County Parks and Recreation
- Website: Official website

Greensfelder County Park consists of 1,734 acres (7.02 km^{2}) in western St. Louis County, Missouri. It is located in the city of Wildwood and bordered to the south by the Eureka and Six Flags St. Louis. Greensfelder is part of the Henry Shaw Ozark Corridor. The park's land was donated to St. Louis County in 1963 by the trustees of the St. Louis Regional Planning and Construction Foundation, which had been established in 1939 by Albert P. Greensfelder. The park was originally named Rockwood Park, but was renamed in 1965 in honor of A.P. Greensfelder.

The park has a nature center, playgrounds pavilions, scenic loop road, stables, a campsite, and eight trails open to hiking, mountain biking, and horseback riding. The park's trails connect to the Rockwoods Reservation to the northeast and the Rockwoods Range Conservation Area to the west, forming a network of 25 miles (40 km) of trails.
