= Missouri Conservationist =

US magazine focusing on conservation of resources

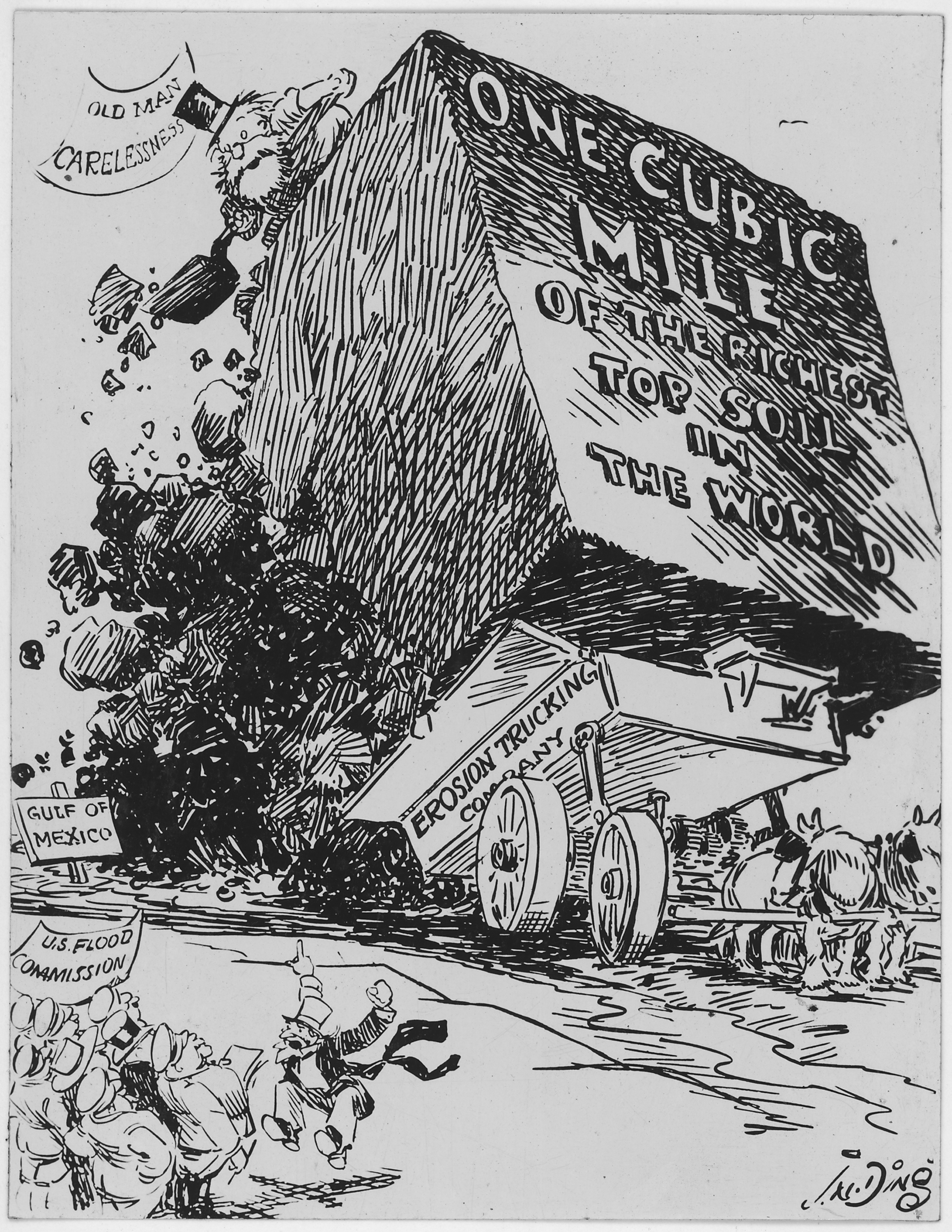
- 1930s editorial cartoon from the Missouri Conservationist
- Editor: Angie Daly Morfeld
- Categories: Wildlife conservation
- Frequency: Monthly
- First issue: 1938
- Company: Missouri Department of Conservation
- Country: United States
- Based in: Jefferson City, Missouri
- Language: English
- Website: www.mdc.mo.gov/conmag/
- ISSN: 0026-6515

The Missouri Conservationist is a monthly periodical published by the Missouri Department of Conservation. It was first published in 1938 by the department's predecessor, the Missouri Conservation Commission. The magazine focuses on educating the general public on issues pertaining to the conservation and management of Missouri's natural resources.

The magazine is free to all residents of the State of Missouri. The cost of its production and postage is supported by a portion of the statewide conservation sales tax. Non-residents can subscribe for a fee. All issues since July 1995 are published online by the Missouri Department of Conservation. Angie Daly Morfeld is the editor as of July 2017. The magazine has an ISSN number of 0026-6515.

== History ==
=== 1938-1943 as a quarterly pamphlet ===
The first issue of the Missouri Conservationist was published by the Missouri Conservation Commission in July 1938. It had 8 pages and a section dedicated to the commissioner. In 1941, the magazine contained a short series called "Conservation Briefs." The January 1942 issue showcased a Ding Darling cartoon on the cover. 1942's spring and summer issues only contained 4 pages. The autumn 1942 issue was the last pamphlet issue before the magazine became monthly in 1943.

=== 1943-1949 early monthly years ===
In April 1943, the Conservationist changed from quarterly to monthly, and they added both a content page and a new feature called "Notes from the Field." This feature focused on conservation agents at work. In 1944, the magazine introduced a bimonthly feature called "Letters from Readers," which showcased readers' feedback on the magazine and its content. From 1943 to 1946, the magazine had a feature that showed the conservation commission members who served during the years of World War II. In August 1946, they moved the editorial to the inside front cover with the contents. In June 1948, the cover honored Aldo Leopold, a famous conservationist who died in the spring of that year. In August 1948, they changed the format in the letters, and in December 1948, the cover featured the former Commissioner E. Sydney Stephens.

=== 1950-1959 ===
In November 1950, the Conservationist changed their letters feature. Then, in August 1951, they changed the inside front cover, removed the contents feature, and changed the letters feature again. In September 1951, they added a cartoon called Consy Coon and in August 1953, they changed the letters in the Conservationist. In January 1955 the Conservationist went from a two-column page to a three-column page, and in January 1956 Consy's Scrapbook appeared on the back cover of the Conservationist. "Notes from the field" appeared for the final time in March 1956, and in June, the Missouri's Outdoor Almanac appeared on the Conservationist. It had quotes about topics previously covered by "Notes from the Field." In July 1957, the cover format changed, andin July 1958, Missouri's Wildlife Trail appeared in the magazine.

=== 1960-1969 ===
The 25th anniversary issue of the Conservationist was published in July of 1962. In August 1964, the inside front cover changed format and added the contents feature back for the first time since its removal in 1951. In May 1967, the contents feature changed format. The May 1968 issue featured a booklet called "A Prairie is Forever," and in July of that year, the Conservationist turned 30 years old. In January 1969, the Conservationist debuted "Field Notes," a feature that only lasted for a year, and in May 1969 the cover changed format.

=== 1970-1979 ===
In June 1970, the typical Conservationist was replaced by a special issue called the "Missouri Conservation Program Report" (also known as the MCP Report). In August 1971, the Conservationist expanded its pages from 20 to 24, with the inclusion of 6 pages in full color. In September 1971, a special issue called "Design for Conservation" appeared in the Conservationist. In January 1972, the Conservationist decreased from three columns to two columns. In July 1973, the magazine turned 35 years old, and in December 1973, the first Conservationist Index appeared.

== List of editors ==
- Townsend Godsey (1938–1941)
- Harold W. Clover (1941–1943)
- Charles H. Callison (1943–1947)
- Dan Saults (1947–1957)
- Jim Keefe (1957–1985)
- Mac Johnson (1985–1989)
- Kathy Love (1989–1997)
- Tom Cwynar (1997–2005)
- Ara Clark (2005–2014)
- Nichole LeClair (2014–2015)
- Angie Daly Morfeld (2015–present)

== Circulation history ==
- Amelia Ferguson (1946–1949)
- Barbara E. Bales (1949–1953)
- Judy Jones (1953–1954)
- Aleda Renken (1954–1968)
- Sharon Mortenson (1968–1969)
- Janet Kauffman (1969–1971)
- Nova Woodall (1971–1972)
- May Shikles (1972–1992)
- Bertha Bainer (1993–2002)
- Laura Scheuler (2002–present)

== Photography History ==
- Rex Gary Schmidt (1943–1949)
- Don Wooldridge (1949–1978)
- Bill Gamble (1949–1950)
- Russ Reagan (1978–1984)
- Mark Sullivan (1978–1990)
- Jim Rathert (1984–2006)
- Paul Childress (1990–1996)
- Cliff White (1996–2005)
- Noppadol Paothong (2006–Present)
- David Stonner (2007–present)
