= John N and Melba S Anderson Memorial Conservation Area =

Protected land in Missouri, U.S.

- IUCN category IV (habitat/species management area)
- Location within Missouri
- Location: Crawford County, Missouri, United States
- Nearest city: Steelville, MO
- Coordinates: 37.916647°N 91.302436°W
- Area: 341 acres (1.4 km^{2})
- Established: March 2007
- Governing body: Missouri Department of Conservation
- Website: Official website

John N and Melba S Anderson Memorial Conservation Area consists of 341 acres (1.38 km^{2}) in Crawford County, Missouri. It is located southeast of the town of Steelville and northwest of Cherryville.

Anderson Conservation Area is forested and does not include any trails. The area is open to hunting with the appropriate permit during hunting seasons.
