= Bellefontaine Conservation Area =

Protected land in Missouri, U.S.

- IUCN category IV (habitat/species management area)
- Location within Missouri
- Location: St. Louis County, Missouri, USA
- Nearest city: Castle Point, MO
- Coordinates: 38.764434°N 90.235818°W
- Area: 133 acres (0.5 km^{2})
- Established: 1995
- Governing body: Missouri Department of Conservation
- Website: Official website

Bellefontaine Conservation Area consists of 133 acres (0.54 km^{2}) in St. Louis County, Missouri. It is located along Interstate 270 in Castle Point.

Bellefontaine Conservation Area is primarily grassland and includes sections of forest and ponds open to fishing. The area was previously owned by the Missouri Department of Mental Health and was transferred to the Missouri Department of Conservation in 1995 because of the unique urban fishing opportunities it provides.
