= Engelmann Woods Natural Area =

Protected land in Missouri, U.S.

- IUCN category IV (habitat/species management area)
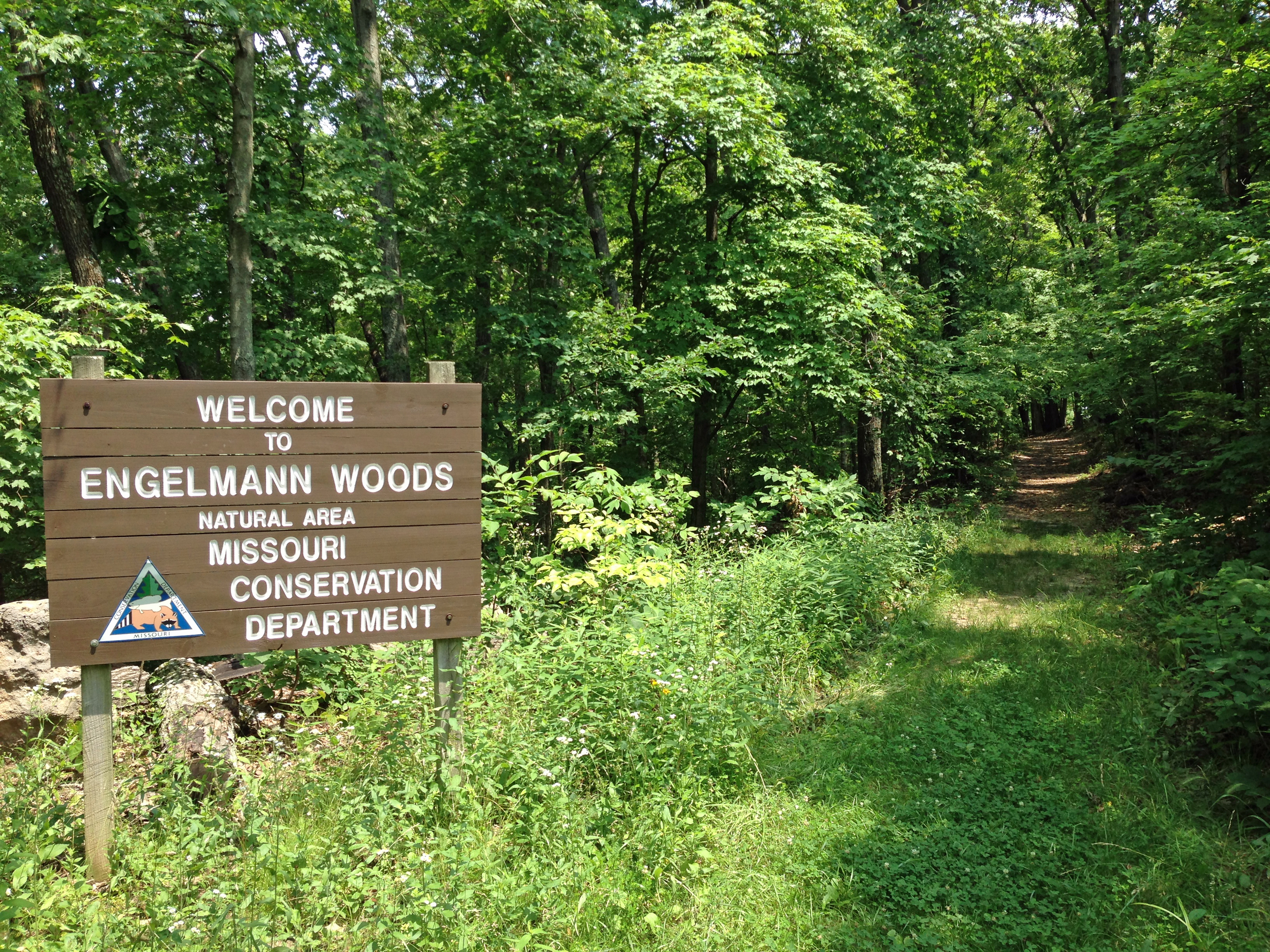

- Location within Missouri
- Location: Franklin County, Missouri, United States
- Nearest city: St. Albans, MO
- Coordinates: 38.570331°N 90.778181°W
- Area: 149 acres (0.6 km^{2})
- Established: 1942
- Governing body: Missouri Department of Conservation
- Website: Official website

Engelmann Woods Natural Area consists of 149 acres (0.60 km^{2}) in northeastern Franklin County, Missouri. It is located southwest of the town of St. Albans on a bluff overlooking the Missouri River.

Engelmann Woods preserves one of the last old growth forests in Missouri. Some of the trees in the area are approximately 3 feet (0.91 m) in diameter, 100 feet (30 m) tall, and 200 years old. In 1942, private landowners, primarily Mrs. Oscar Johnson, donated the land to the Missouri Botanical Garden. The Missouri Department of Conservation acquired the area in the 1980s, and it was designated a natural area in 1983.

There is a 1.5-mile (2.4 km) hiking trail in the area, and hunting and fishing are not permitted in the area.
