= Blanchette Landing Access =

Public riverside in Missouri, U.S.

- IUCN category V (protected landscape/seascape)
- Location within Missouri
- Location: St. Charles County, Missouri, United States
- Nearest city: St. Charles, MO
- Coordinates: 38.793377°N 90.474112°W
- Area: 20 acres (0.1 km^{2})
- Governing body: Missouri Department of Conservation
- Website: Official website

Blanchette Landing Access consists of 20 acres (0.081 km^{2}) in St. Charles County, Missouri. It is located in the city of St. Charles, and provides access to the Missouri River.

The area consists of a boat launch, parking lot, pavilion, and restrooms. Fishing is permitted in the conservation area, and there are no designated trails.
