= Brown's Ford Access =

Public riverside in Missouri, U.S.

- IUCN category IV (habitat/species management area)
- Location within Missouri
- Location: Jefferson County, Missouri, United States
- Nearest city: De Soto, MO
- Coordinates: 38.213028°N 90.706228°W
- Area: 1.47 acres (0.6 ha)
- Governing body: Missouri Department of Conservation
- Website: Official website

Brown's Ford Access consists of 1.47 acres (0.59 ha) in Jefferson County, Missouri northwest of De Soto. The access is owned and managed by the Missouri Department of Conservation and provides access to the Big River via a boat launch.
