= Myron and Sonya Glassberg Family Conservation Area =

Protected land in Missouri, U.S.

- IUCN category IV (habitat/species management area)
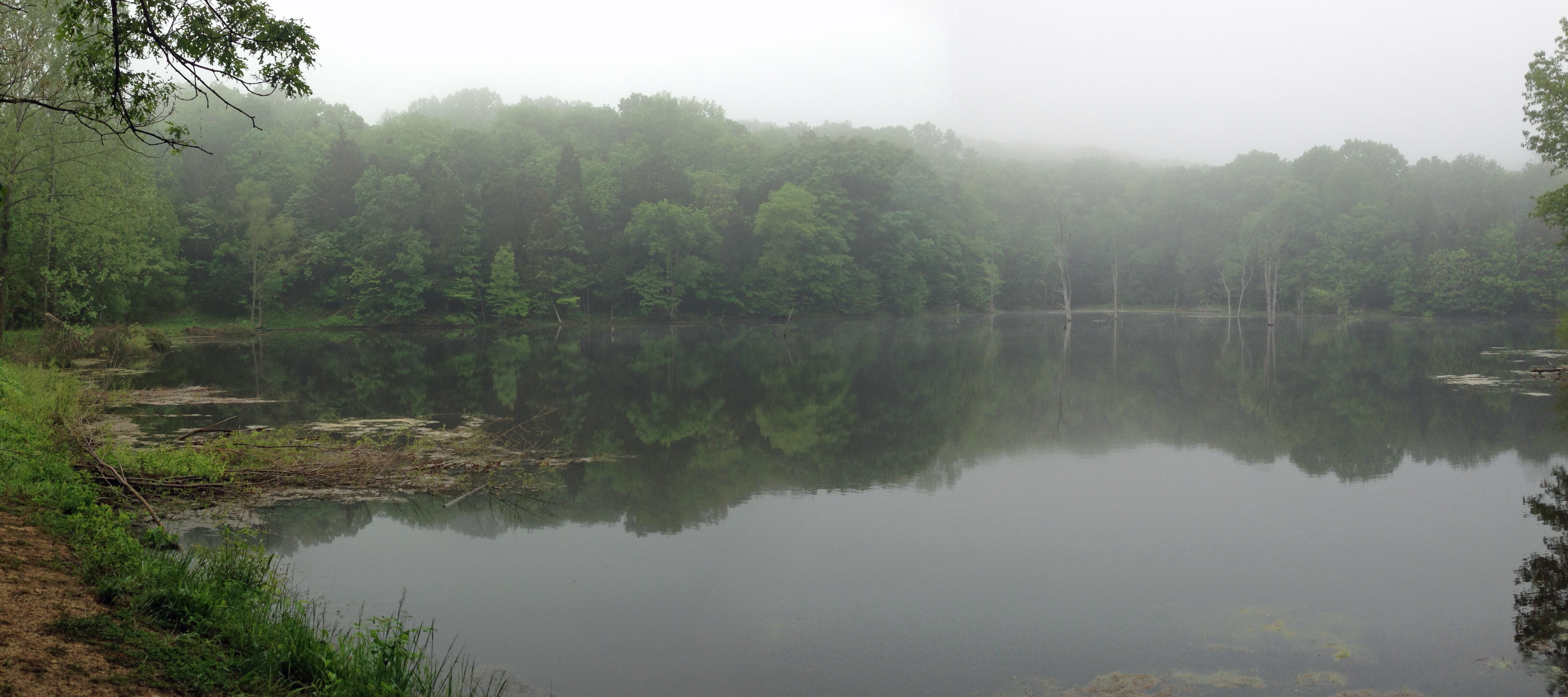
- Buder Lake

- Location within Missouri
- Location: Jefferson County, Missouri, United States
- Nearest city: Eureka, MO
- Coordinates: 38°26′22″N 90°40′52″W
- Area: 429 acres (1.7 km^{2})
- Established: 2012; 14 years ago
- Governing body: Missouri Department of Conservation
- Website: Official website

Myron and Sonya Glassberg Family Conservation Area is a 429-acre (1.74 km^{2}) protected area in northwestern Jefferson County, Missouri. It is south of Eureka and southeast of Pacific. The Glassberg Family Conservation Area is located within the watershed of the Meramec River, primarily in the watershed of LaBarque Creek. The Young Conservation Area is about 0.2 miles (0.32 km) to the east and LaBarque Creek Conservation Area is about 1.2 miles (1.9 km) to the southwest.

The acquisition of the conservation area's land was made possible by a donation from the Myron and Sonya Glassberg Family and the Forest Legacy Program run by the U.S. Forest Service. The land was acquired to protect the water quality of LaBarque Creek, which is one of the highest quality streams in the St. Louis area, with at least 42 species of fish. The area was opened to the public in December 2012.

There is a 3 miles (4.8 km) loop hiking trail, a 0.5 miles (0.80 km) trail around 3-acre (1.2 ha) Buder Lake, which is open to fishing, and a scenic overlook above the Meramec River. There are five additional fishless ponds. A limestone monument designed by Gail Cassilly and dedicated to the Glassberg family is located near the parking area. No horses, camping, motorized vehicles, or bicycles are permitted in the area.
