= Blue Springs Creek =

Stream in the American state of Missouri

Coordinates: 38°07′16″N 91°09′39″W

Blue Springs Creek is a stream in Crawford County in the U.S. state of Missouri. It is a tributary of the Meramec River.

The stream headwaters arise just south of Bourbon. It flows east past the south side of Bourbon and turns to the southeast parallel to Missouri Route N. The stream flows through the Blue Springs Creek Conservation Area to enter the Meramec just east of the conservation area. The headwaters are at and the confluence with the Meramec is at .

The stream was named for the large spring along its course known as Blue Spring. The stream was also referred to as Thicketty Creek due to the presence of numerous brush thickets along its banks.
