= Emmenegger Nature Park =

Protected land in Missouri, U.S.

- IUCN category IV (habitat/species management area)
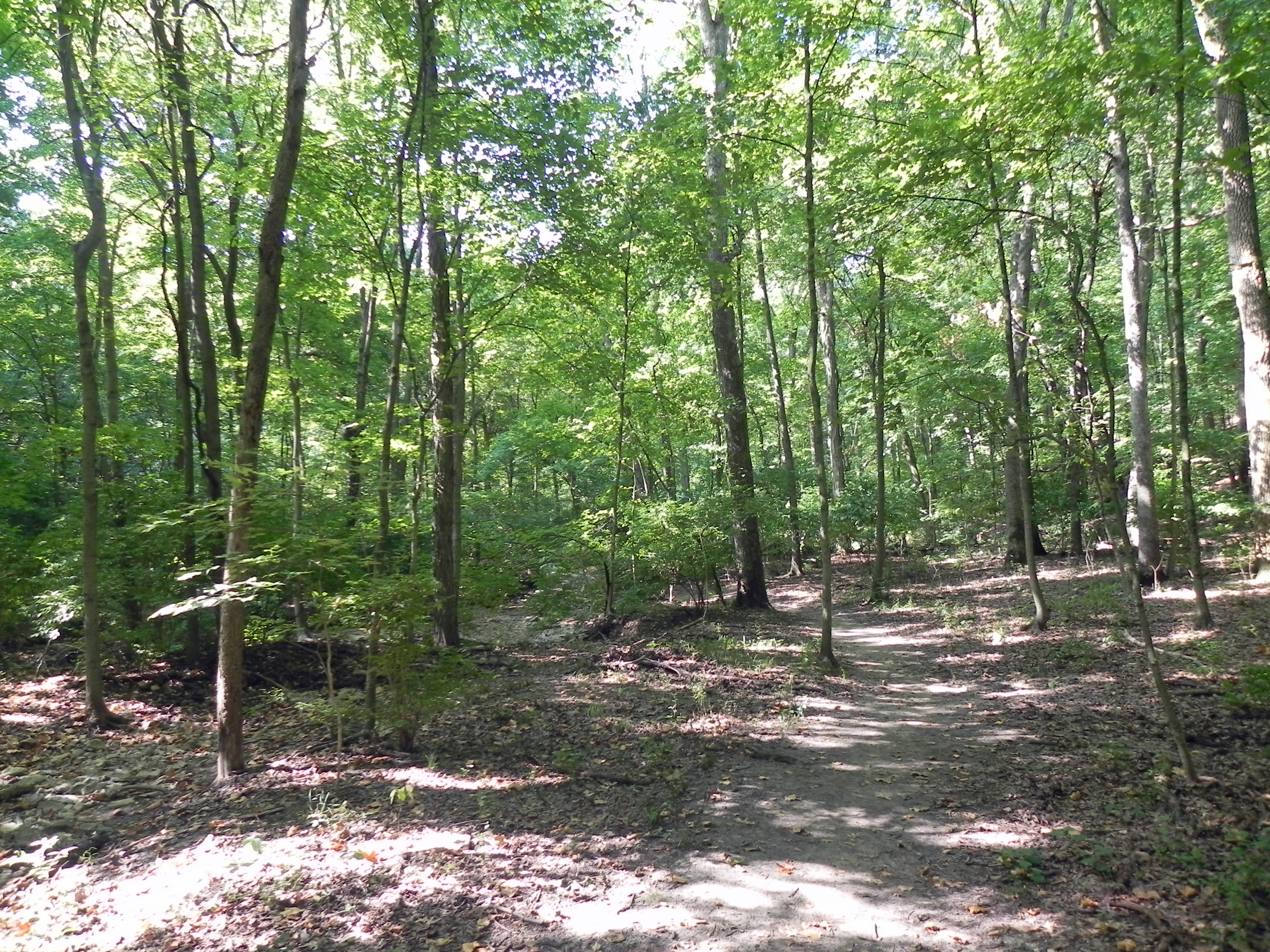

- Location within Missouri
- Location: St. Louis County, Missouri, United States
- Nearest city: Kirkwood, MO
- Coordinates: 38.551358°N 90.434152°W
- Area: 93 acres (0.4 km^{2})
- Established: March 6, 1975
- Governing body: Missouri Department of Conservation
- Website: Official website

Emmenegger Nature Park (ENP) consists of 93 acres (0.38 km^{2}) in southwestern St. Louis County, Missouri. It is located in the city of Kirkwood and bordered to the west by the Meramec River, to the south by Interstate 44 and the Possum Woods Conservation Area, and to the east by Interstate 270. The ENP is part of the Henry Shaw Ozark Corridor. The Powder Valley Nature Center is directly to the east of ENP across Interstate 270.

The area had been used at various times as an exotic animal breeding area for the St. Louis Zoo, a resort, public swimming pool, and tennis club. The land was purchased by real estate developer Russell. E. Emmenegger in the 1970s before he donated it to the city of Kirkwood. The land is currently leased by the Missouri Department of Conservation.

The land of Emmenegger Nature Park was originally owned by Edwin A. Lemp as part of his Cragwold estate.

The ENP has a 1 mi (1.6 km) hiking trail and a .5 mi (0.80 km) disabled-accessible trail in addition to a pavilion, picnic table, and recreation fields.
