= Blue Springs Creek Conservation Area =

Protected land in Missouri, U.S.

- IUCN category IV (habitat/species management area)
- Location within Missouri
- Location: Crawford County, Missouri, United States
- Nearest city: Bourbon, MO
- Coordinates: 38.117797°N 91.177392°W
- Area: 859 acres (3.5 km^{2})
- Established: 1983
- Governing body: Missouri Department of Conservation
- Website: Official website

Blue Springs Creek Conservation Area consists of 859 acres (3.48 km^{2}) about 2.5 miles (4.0 km) southwest of Bourbon, Missouri. It is named for, and crossed by, Blue Springs Creek for 3.7 miles (6.0 km), which flows into the Meramec River at the area's eastern boundary. The creek is fed by four springs located on private property in its watershed. Blue Springs Creek is managed for rainbow trout, while the area supports abundant populations of white-tailed deer, wild turkey, and squirrels. Current management is focused on improving quail habitat. Hunting and fishing are permitted as long as appropriate regulations are followed.

The conservation area has 598 acres (242 ha) of forest, 251 acres (102 ha) of grasslands, and 10 acres (4.0 ha) of glades. The area was originally acquired by the Missouri Department of Conservation from the Army Corps of Engineers in 1983 and was expanded when an additional tract was added in 1992. There is a boat launch and three parking areas in the conservation area.
