= Hobo, Colombia =

Hobo, Huila
- Municipality and town
- Flag Coat of arms

- Location of the municipality and town of Hobo, Huila in the Huila Department of Colombia.

- Location in Colombia
- Coordinates: 2°34′54″N 75°26′59″W
- Country: Colombia
- Department: Huila Department
- Time zone: UTC-5 (Colombia Standard Time)

Hobo is a town and municipality in the Huila Department, Colombia.
