= Allenton Access =

Public riverside in Missouri, U.S.

- IUCN category V (protected landscape/seascape)
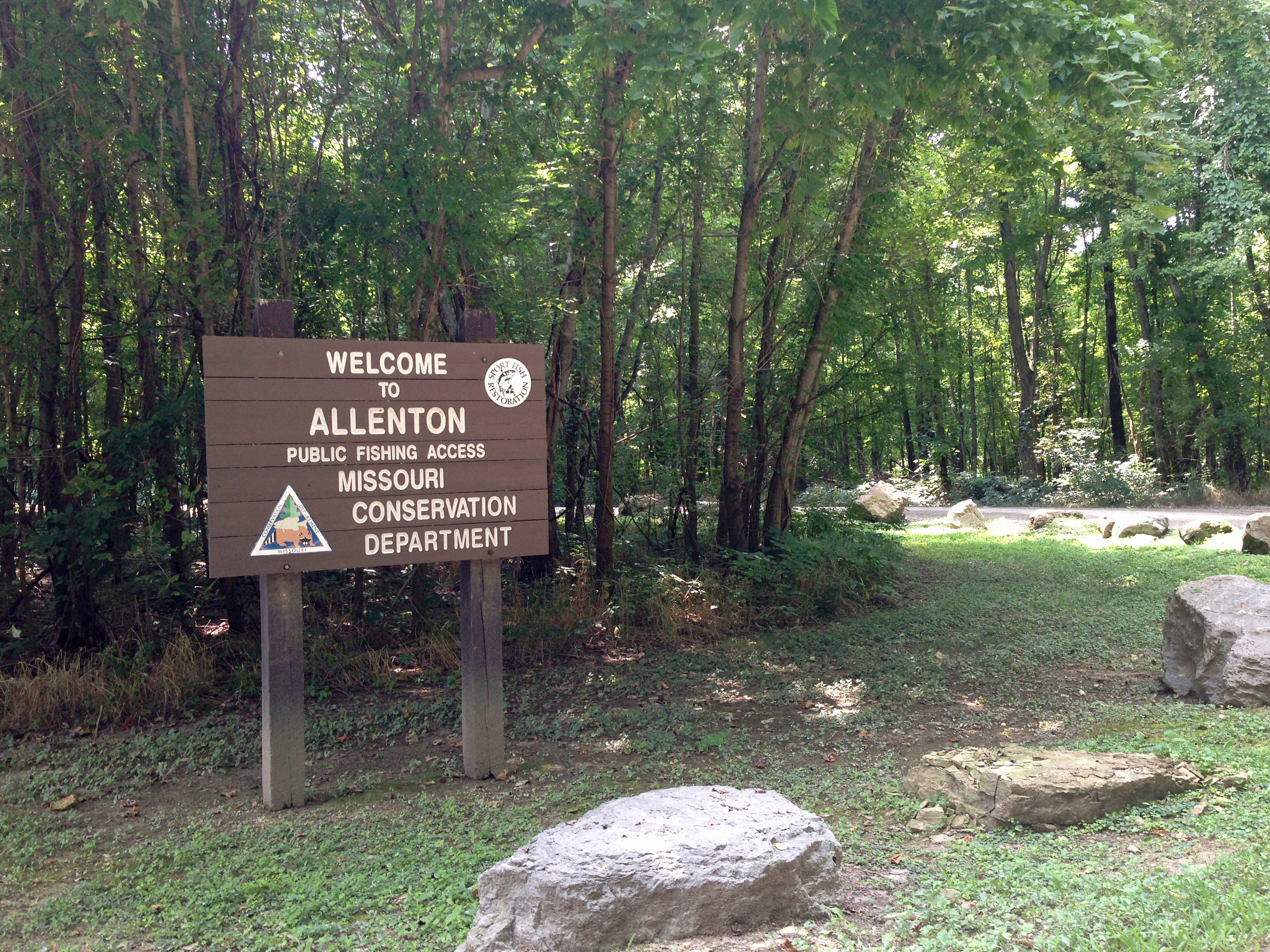

- Location within Missouri
- Location: St. Louis County, Missouri, United States
- Nearest city: Eureka, MO
- Coordinates: 38.474215°N 90.660456°W
- Area: 9 acres (0.0 km^{2})
- Governing body: Missouri Department of Conservation
- Website: Official website

Allenton Access is a protected nature area consisting of 9 acres (0.036 km^{2}) in western St. Louis County, Missouri. It is located southwest of the town of Eureka, east of the town of Pacific and bordered to the south by the Meramec River. It is part of the Meramec Greenway and Henry Shaw Ozark Corridor.

Allenton Access consists of a boat launch, parking lot, and restroom surrounded by forest. Fishing is permitted with the appropriate permit. There have been 46 bird species recorded at Allenton Access.

The area was acquired in 1968 by the Missouri Department of Conservation to "provide better public access to the Meramec River".
