= Rockwoods Reservation =

Protected land in Missouri, U.S.

- IUCN category V (protected landscape/seascape)
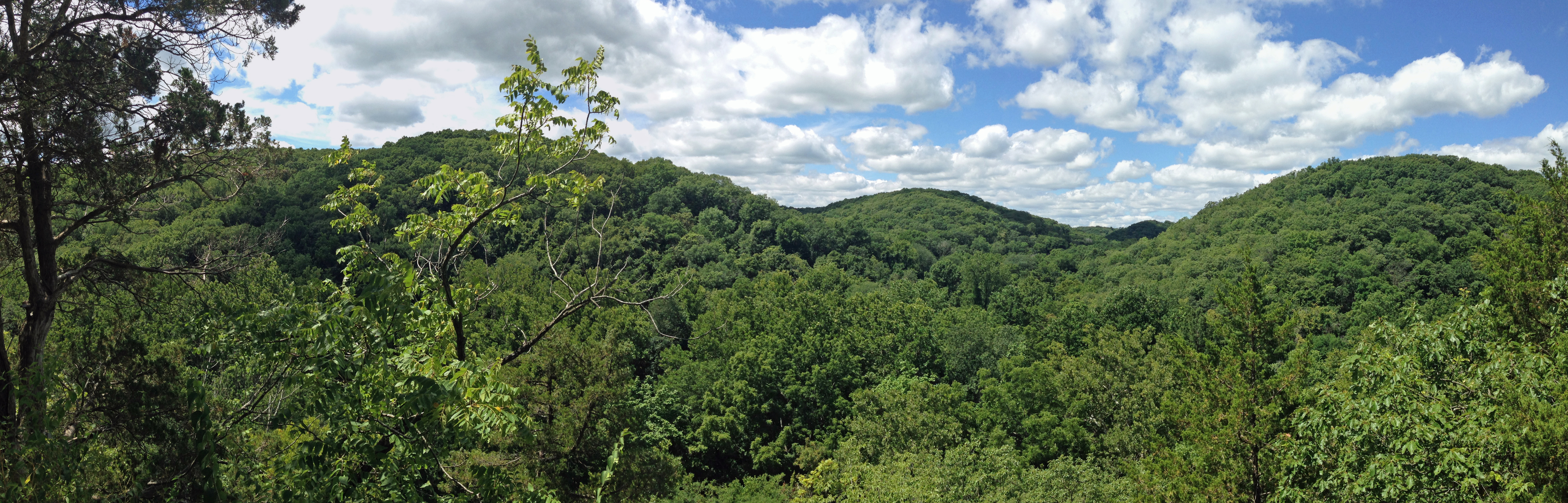
- View from the overlook on the Trail Among the Trees

- Location within Missouri
- Location: St. Louis County, Missouri, United States
- Nearest city: Wildwood, MO
- Coordinates: 38°33′59″N 90°39′47″W
- Area: 1,843 acres (7.46 km^{2})
- Established: 1938
- Governing body: Missouri Department of Conservation
- Website: Official website

Rockwoods Reservation is a 1,843 acres (746 ha) state forest and wildlife conservation area in St. Louis County, Missouri. It was established in 1938, making it one of the oldest conservation areas established by the Missouri Department of Conservation.

Rockwoods is significant for its close location in a rapidly developing suburban area and close to a major urban area. It supports a diverse array of native plant and animal life, contains geologically-interesting rock formations, and ecologically-important springs and caves. Rockwoods Reservation is not a pristine wilderness untouched by human hands, however; remnants of extensive former limestone, clay and gravel quarrying operations are hidden in the dense second growth hardwood forest. Most of the original forest was clearcut to feed lime kilns.

Rockwoods Reservation adjoins St. Louis County's 1,724 acres (698 ha) Greensfelder County Park to the south, which itself abuts the state's 1,388 acres (562 ha) Rockwoods Range Conservation Area. Together, these three parcels constitute a contiguous green belt of almost 5,000 acres (2,000 ha). The 14.5-mile (23.3 km) Greenrock Trail is a hiking trail that crosses all three areas with one terminus in Rockwoods Reservation.

There are six trails in Rockwoods Reservation:

- Wildlife Habitat Discovery Trail 0.1 miles (0.16 km)
- Rock Quarry Trail - 2.2 miles (3.5 km)
- Trail Among the Trees - 1.5 miles (2.4 km)
- Lime Kiln Trail - 3.2 miles (5.1 km)
- Green Rock Trail - 3.6 miles (5.8 km) of the trail's 14.5 miles (23.3 km)
- Turkey Ridge Trail - 2 miles (3.2 km)
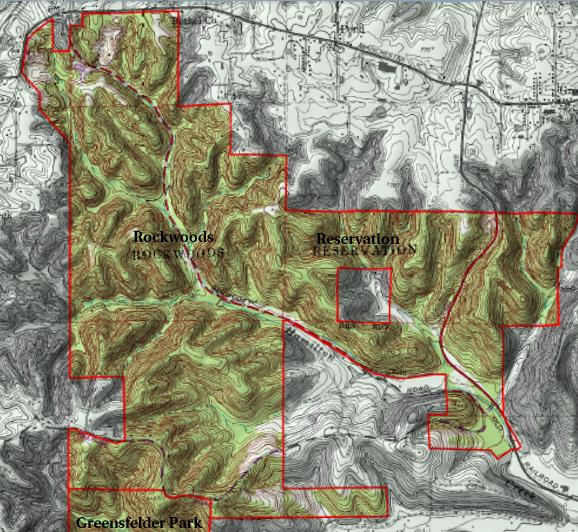
Rockwoods Reservation map

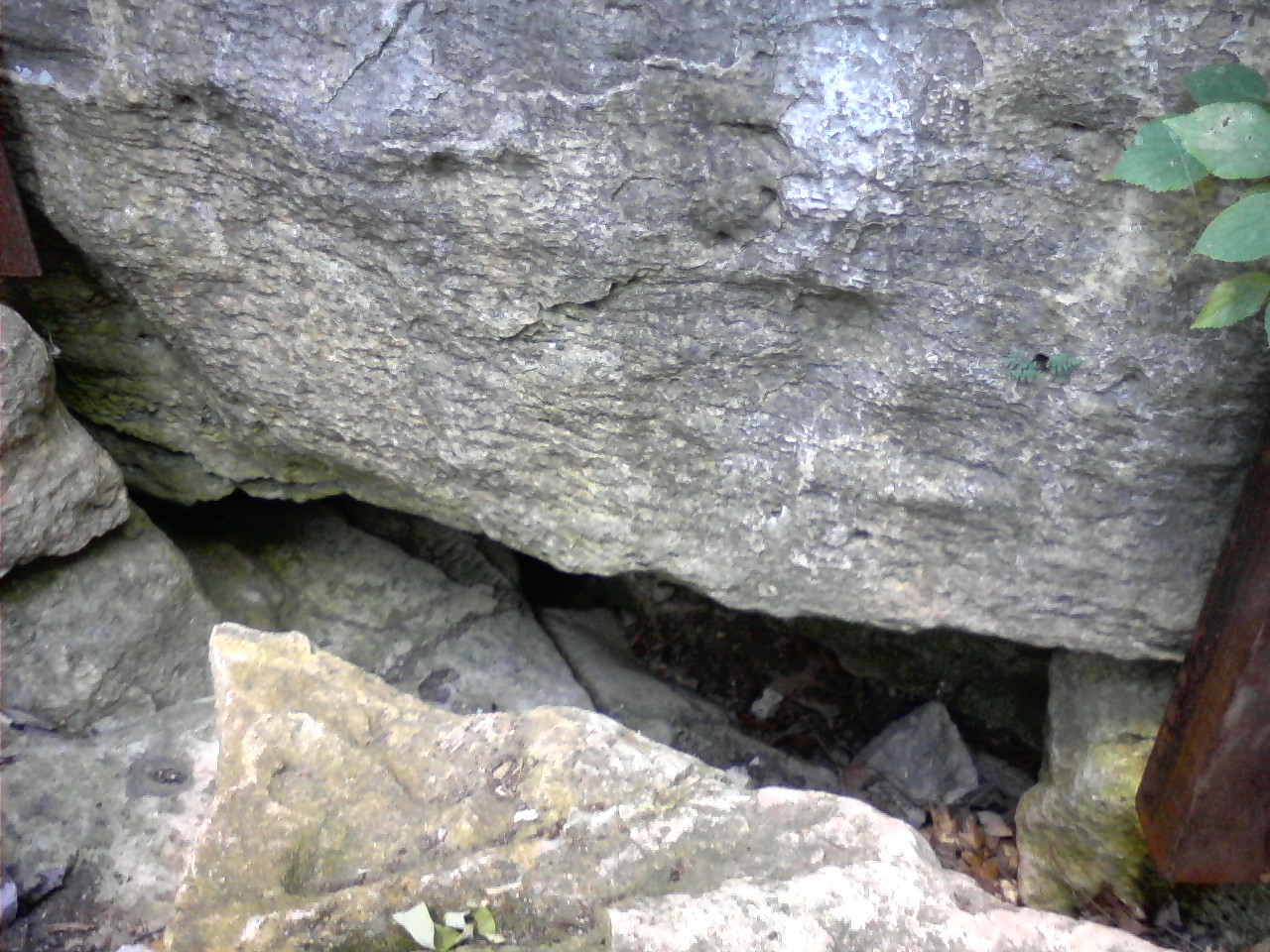
Rockwoods Cave entrance

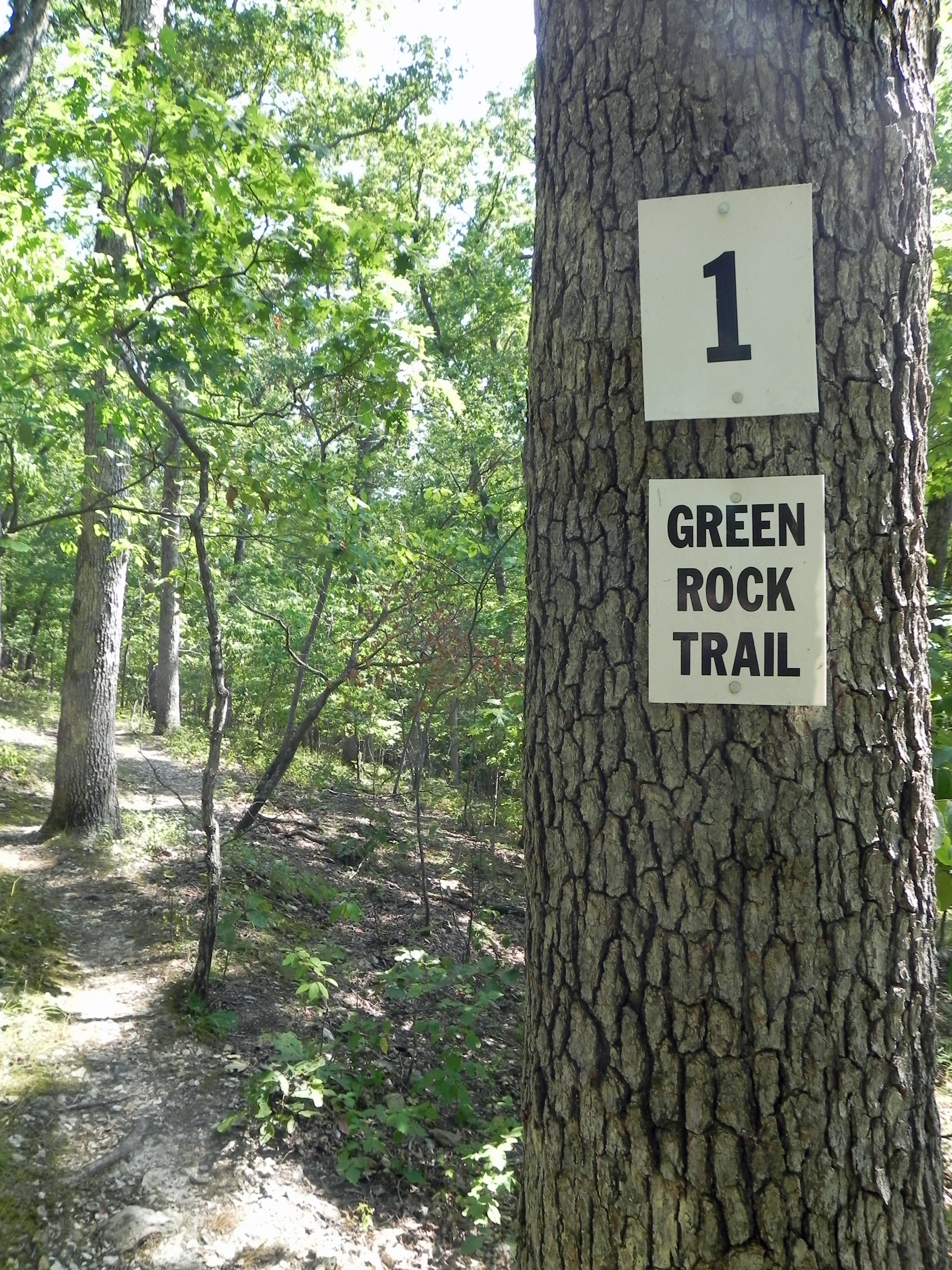
Green Rock Trail
