= Forest 44 Conservation Area =

Protected land in Missouri, U.S.

- IUCN category IV (habitat/species management area)
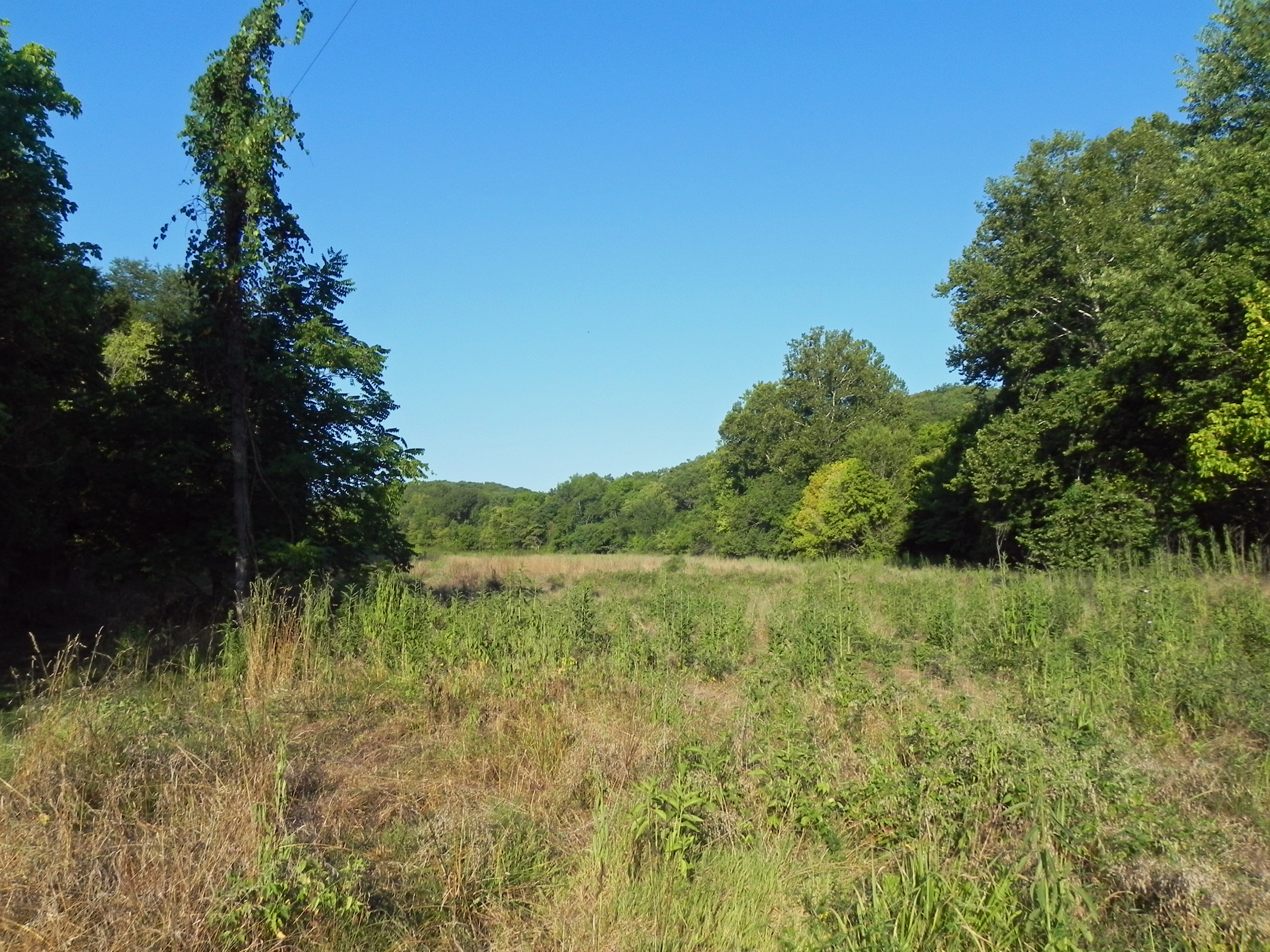

- Location within Missouri
- Location: St. Louis County, Missouri, United States
- Nearest city: Valley Park, MO
- Coordinates: 38.522221°N 90.532918°W
- Area: 998 acres (4.0 km^{2})
- Established: 1990
- Governing body: Missouri Department of Conservation
- Website: Official website

Forest 44 Conservation Area consists of 998 acres (4.04 km^{2}) in western St. Louis County, Missouri. It is located near the town of Valley Park, Missouri, and is bordered to the north by Interstate 44. It is part of the Henry Shaw Ozark Corridor.

Forest 44 was once part of a cattle ranch that covered 10,000 acres (40 km^{2}). The land was purchased in 1990 by the Missouri Department of Conservation from the heirs of the Reinken Estates. An additional 40 acres (0.16 km^{2}) were acquired by partial donation and is known as the Dorothy E. Aselman Memorial Addition.

Forest 44 has a 0.4 miles (0.64 km) paved disabled-accessible trail, a 2.2 miles (3.5 km) hiking only trail, and 11.8 miles (19.0 km) of multi-use trails open to hiking and horseback riding. The area is open to hunting and fishing with permits during the appropriate seasons. There is also a staffed shooting range. There are 914 acres (3.70 km^{2}) of forest and 44 acres (0.18 km^{2}) of grassland.

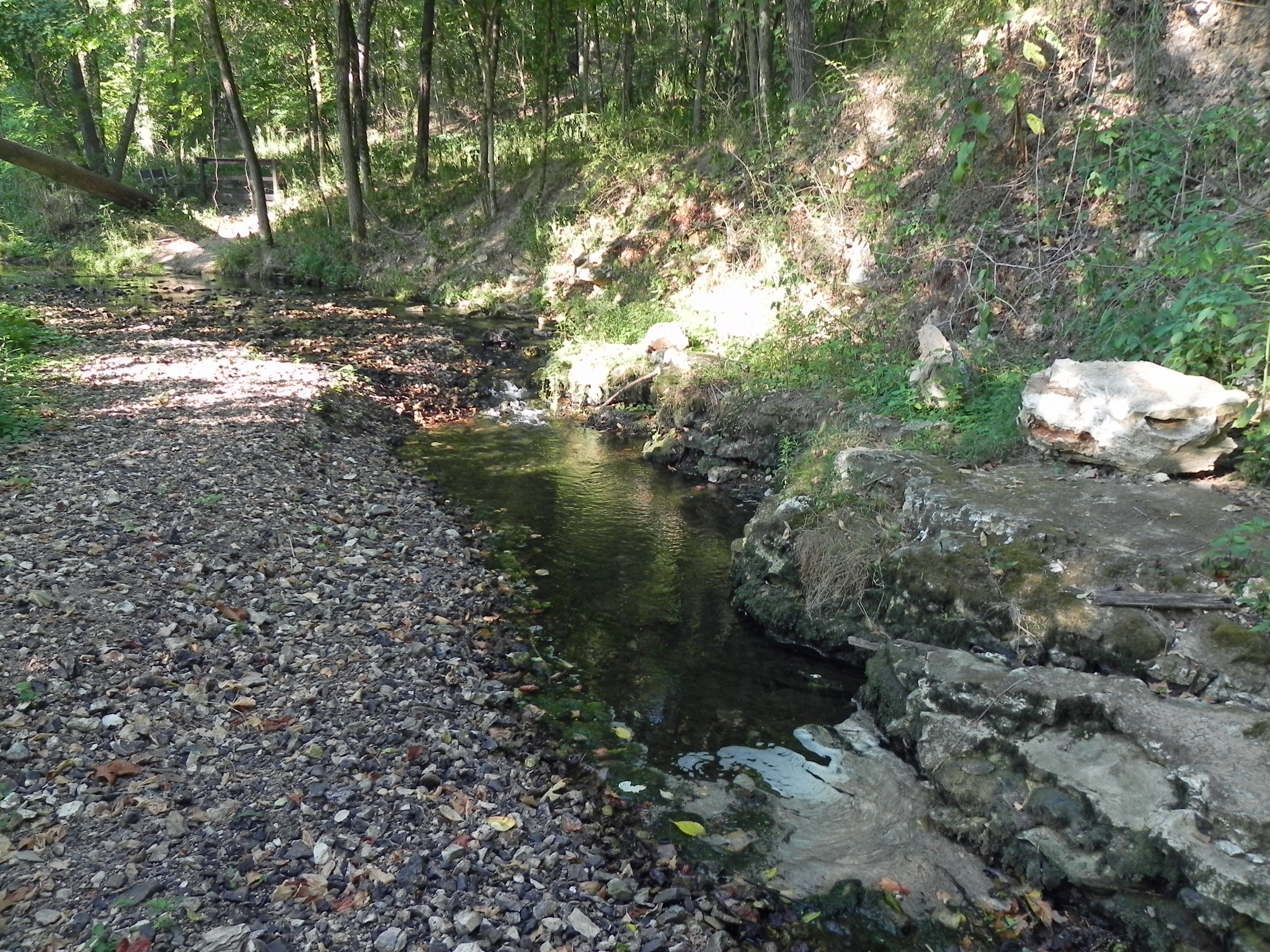
Williams Creek

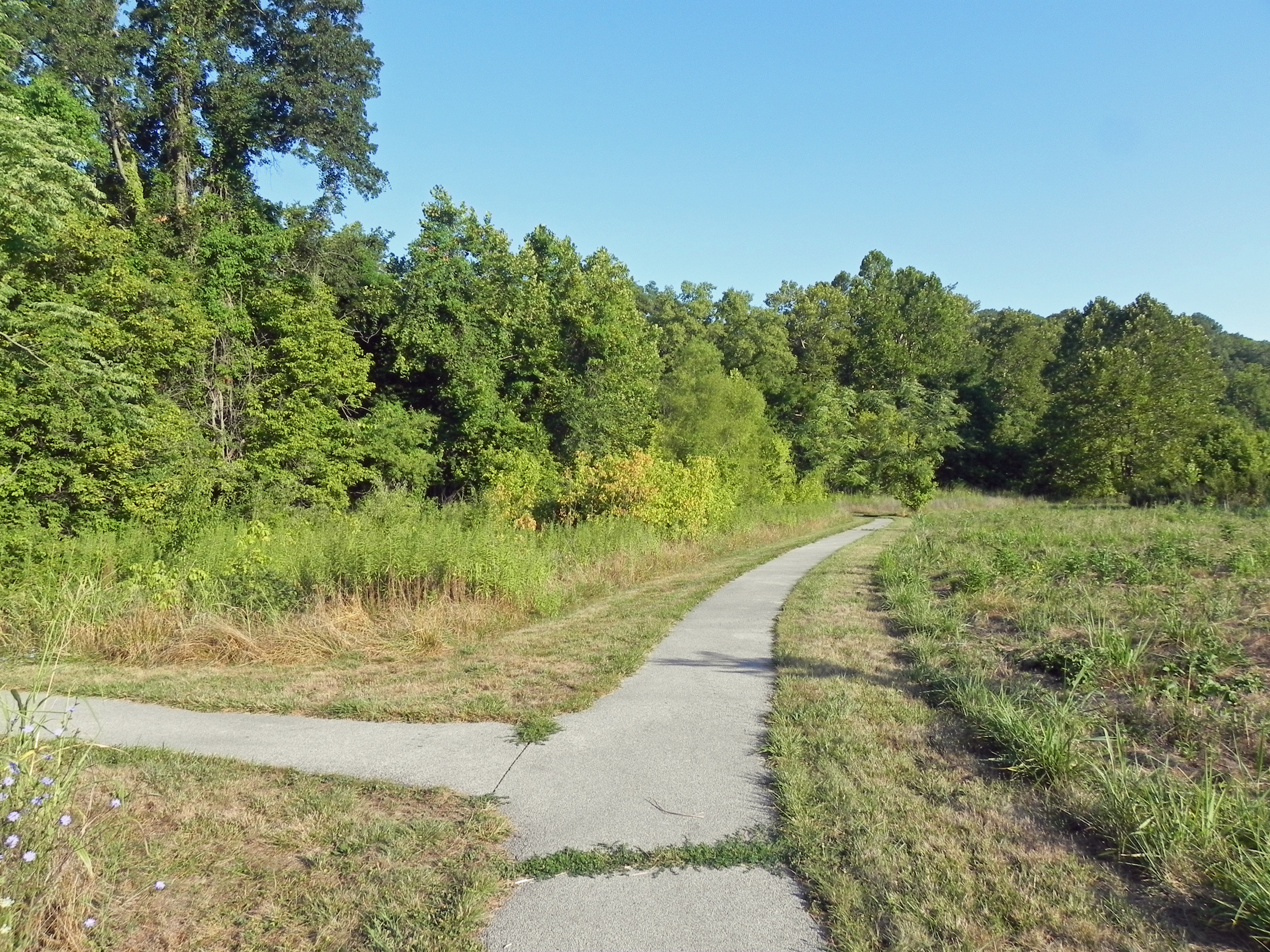
Losing Stream Trail

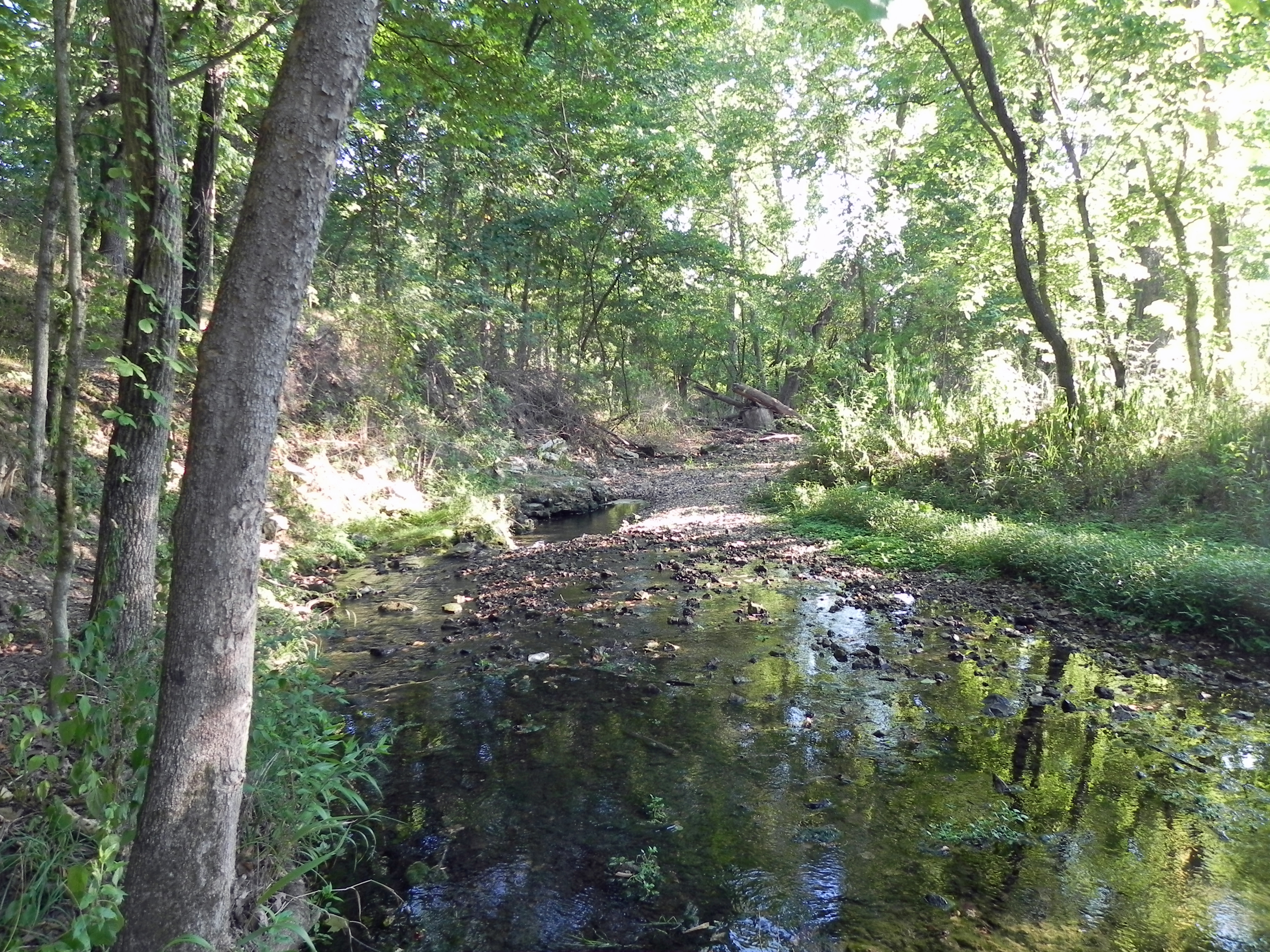
Williams Creek
