= Robertsville State Park =

State park in Missouri, United States

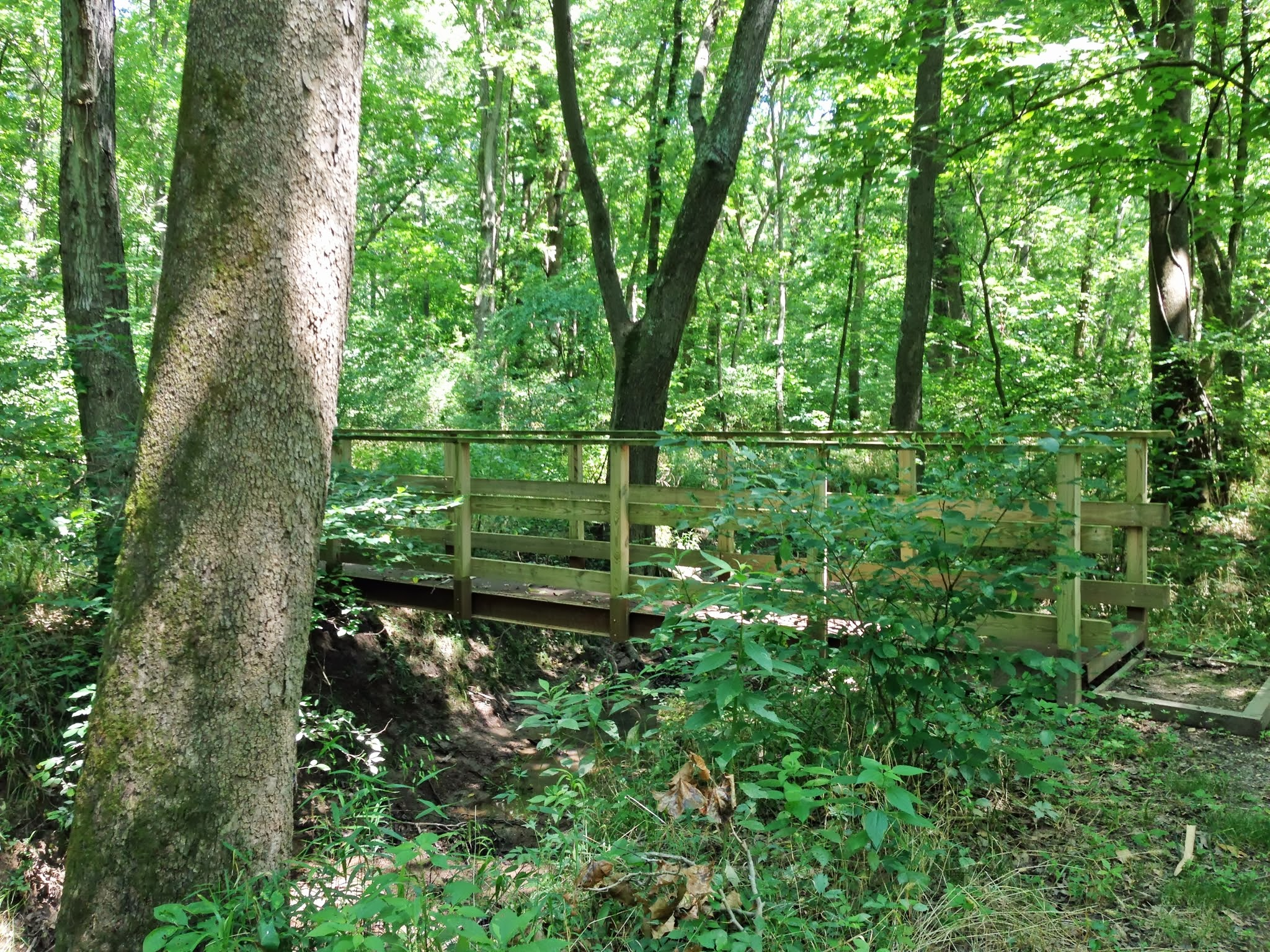
- A footbridge on the Spice Bush Trail

- Location within Missouri Location within the United States
- Location: Franklin County, Missouri, United States
- Coordinates: 38°25′24″N 90°48′50″W
- Area: 1,224.65 acres (495.60 ha)
- Established: 1979
- Administrator: Missouri Department of Natural Resources
- Visitors: 136,959 (in 2023)
- Website: Official website

Robertsville State Park is a public recreation area bordering the Meramec River in unincorporated Robertsville in Franklin County, Missouri. The state park's 1,225 acres (496 ha) include a boat launch, campground, playground, picnic shelters, and the Spice Bush and Lost Hill hiking trails. The land was once owned by Edward James Roberts, who moved to the area at age 14 in 1831.
