= Pacific Palisades Conservation Area =

Protected land in Missouri, U.S.

- IUCN category IV (habitat/species management area)
- Location within Missouri
- Location: Jefferson and St. Louis counties, Missouri, United States
- Nearest city: Pacific, MO
- Coordinates: 38°28′27″N 90°43′19″W
- Area: 695 acres (281 ha)
- Governing body: Missouri Department of Conservation
- Website: Official website

The Pacific Palisades Conservation Area is a conservation area located along the Meramec River where St. Louis, Jefferson, and Franklin counties meet in Missouri, USA. It is named for the rock and sand formations along this portion of the Meramec River. The LaBarque Creek Conservation Area is about 3.3 miles (5.3 km) to the south.

Pacific Palisades Conservation Area is a 695-acre tract between St. Louis and Jefferson counties. The area is divided into a wildlife area in Jefferson County and an access area, in St. Louis County. River access is only available from the St. Louis county section. Hunting is allowed only in the Jefferson County section.

The access area is located in St. Louis county 800 yards (730 m) west of Eureka on Franklin Road. The access area hosts a Meramec River access and is on the north shore of the Meramec River.

The wildlife area is in Jefferson County, off English Road, 1.5 miles (2.4 km) south of Pacific, Missouri. The wildlife area has a diverse ecology with two lakes, 300 acres (120 ha) of forest, 50 acres (20 ha) of prairie, 145 acres (59 ha) of field, 200 acres (81 ha) of cropland, a once-prominent ramp, and large bluffs along south bank of the Meramec River.

The area is good for hunting deer, turkey, and doves. Herons and other waterfowl typically nest around the lakes. A large number of mussel beds are also located along this section of the Meramec River. Game fish species include bluegill, largemouth bass, and crappie.
