= Missouri Department of Conservation =

State government agency in Missouri, U.S.

Department of Conservation overview
- Formed: 1936
- Jurisdiction: Missouri
- Department of Conservation executive: Jason Sumners
- Website: Official website

Map
- Lands managed by the MDC in 2007

The Missouri Department of Conservation (MDC) and the Missouri Conservation Commission were created by Article IV Sections 40-42 of the Missouri Constitution, which were adopted by the voters of the state in 1936 as Amendment 4 to the constitution. The Commission is vested with control, management, restoration, conservation, and regulation of fish, forest, and wildlife resources of the state. The Department of Conservation owns and oversees hatcheries, sanctuaries, refuges, and reservations, and enforces the state wildlife code. The Commission consists of four individuals appointed by the Governor of Missouri to serve unpaid 6-year terms. No more than two of the individuals may be from the same political party.

== Leadership ==
As of June 2024, the tenth and current director of the Department of Conservation is Jason Summers.

== Publications ==
The department publishes the Missouri Conservationist, a monthly periodical that is free to all residents of the state of Missouri.

== Conservation areas ==
Administrative regions used by the Conservation Department as of 2010

The MDC administers hundreds of parcels of land in all counties of the state. Most areas are owned by the department, but some are leased to the department, and some areas are leased by the department to other entities for management. The department only acquires land from willing sellers and compensates local taxing authorities for the loss of property taxes.

The department has divided the counties of the state into eight administrative regions for the purpose of managing these lands and providing conservation services to the citizens of the state.

== See also ==
- List of law enforcement agencies in Missouri
- List of state and territorial fish and wildlife management agencies in the United States
