= Statue of Artemas Ward =

Statue by Leonard Crunelle in Washington, D.C., U.S.

- General Artemas Ward
- U.S. Historic district – Contributing property
- D.C. Inventory of Historic Sites
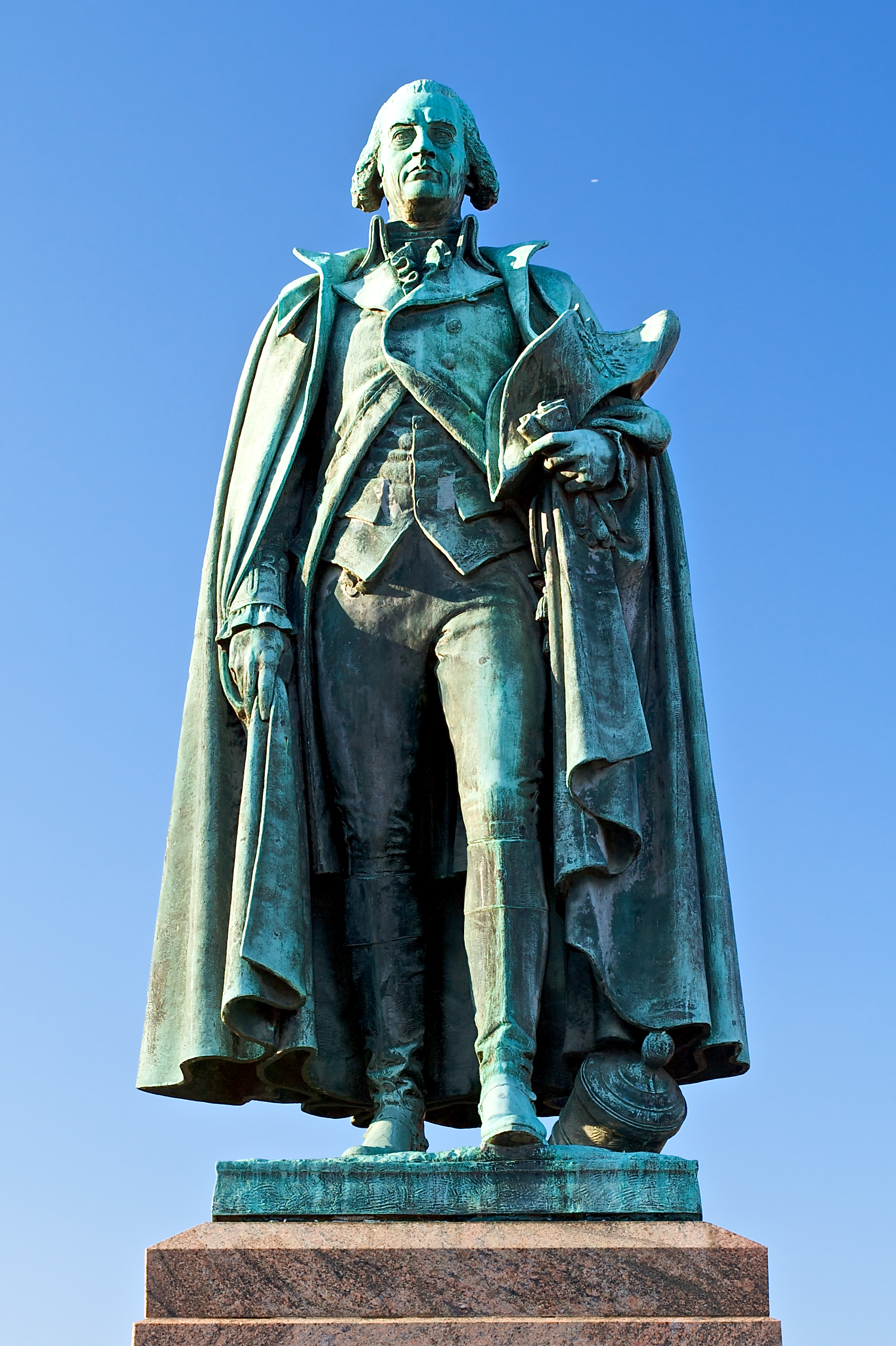
- Statue of Artemas Ward in 2008
- Location: Ward Circle, Washington, D.C., United States
- Coordinates: 38°56′16.44″N 77°5′9.24″W
- Built: Completion (1938); Dedication (1938)
- Architect: Leonard Crunelle
- Part of: American Revolution Statuary (ID78000256)

Significant dates
- Designated CP: July 14, 1978
- Designated DCIHS: March 3, 1979

General Artemas Ward is a bronze statue of American Revolutionary War general Artemas Ward. It is sited in the center of Ward Circle, which was specifically made for the statue, at the intersection of Nebraska and Massachusetts Avenue in the American University Park neighborhood of Washington, D.C. The 10-foot (3.0 m) statue of Ward was completed in 1936, but was not unveiled for two years. Ward was the first Commander-in-Chief of colonial forces during the Revolutionary War and served in a number of government roles, including as representative to the United States House of Representatives.

Congress authorized the installation of a statue in 1928. Sculptor Leonard Crunelle from Chicago was chosen to create the statue. The pedestal was made from granite from Stony Creek, Connecticut. The president and fellows of Harvard College donated the funds to cover the cost of the statue. The donation fulfilled the terms of the will of Artemus Ward, an alumnus of Harvard and the great-grandson of Major General Artemus Ward, who donated $5,000,000 to the university. The statue was unveiled on November 3, 1938, by the great-great-great-granddaughter of Ward. Secretary of War Harry Hines Woodring spoke at the unveiling and accepted it on behalf of the president and the nation. The figure of Ward is wearing a Revolutionary War general's uniform, with a hat and gloves in his left hand, and a cannon at his feet.

The Ward statue is one of 14 American Revolution statues in Washington, D.C., that were collectively listed on the National Register of Historic Places in 1978. They were listed on the District of Columbia Inventory of Historic Sites the following year.

== History ==
=== Biography ===
Artemas Ward was born on November 26, 1727, in Shrewsbury, Province of Massachusetts Bay (today's Massachusetts). His father found success in various careers, including local and state government jobs. Ward attended common schools followed by Harvard College, where he graduated in 1748 and briefly taught. He married Sarah Trowbridge in 1750, with whom he had eight children. In 1752, Ward was appointed Justice of the Peace and later elected to the Massachusetts Provincial Assembly, where he served for numerous terms.

When the French and Indian War broke out, Ward split his time between fighting the enemy and serving in the Massachusetts General Court. He was promoted to Lieutenant Colonel in the Provincial Army during the war. After the war's conclusion, Ward moved back to his hometown and worked in the local court system. A year before the American Revolutionary War began in 1775, Ward was commissioned as a Brigadier General by the Massachusetts Provincial Congress on October 27, 1774. Ward was promoted to Commander in Chief of Massachusetts' colonial army on May 19, 1775. The next month the Continental Congress promoted him to Major General. George Washington was the only military officer who held seniority over Ward. He led forces defending Boston during the siege of the city until the arrival of Washington. His health deteriorated during the war, resulting in him giving orders from his bed to acting officers. Ward retired from the military in 1777, citing health reasons.

Ward was well enough to serve in the Continental Congress from 1780-1782, and also served as president of the Massachusetts Governor's Council. He was repeatedly elected to the Massachusetts House of Representatives and eventually became Speaker of the Massachusetts House in 1786. He was elected to the United States House of Representatives in 1791 and served two terms. Ward retired from public life in 1797, spending his last few years in Shrewsbury until his death on October 28, 1800.

=== Memorial and dedication ===
==== Memorial plans ====
Ward's accomplishments were often overlooked by historians and the public, despite him being the first Commander-in-Chief of colonial forces in the Revolutionary War. His great-grandson, also named Artemas Ward, bequeathed $5,000,000 to Harvard University, on the grounds that Ward's home be maintained and turned into a museum, and by other means which would highlight Ward's contribution to U.S. history. Officials at Harvard chose to commission a statue of Ward, one that would be located in the nation's capital. Additional memorials were erected in Cambridge, Massachusetts, and Shrewsbury. The person the United States Commission of Fine Arts (CFA) chose to create the statue was Leonard Crunelle, a sculptor from Chicago, whose other works include the statue of Richard J. Oglesby, the Victory Monument, and the Heald Square Monument.

With assistance from another descendant, Florence Ward, Crunelle was able to see some of Ward's original clothing, including his sash. An Act of Congress on May 21, 1928, authorized the plan to install a statue. In July 1931, Harvard officials told Crunelle what type of statue and pedestal they had in mind, including a bronze statue, granite pedestal, and allegorical figures. The compensation for the statue was $49,000, and in the contract the statue and pedestal were to be ready by 1936. U.S. Representative Robert Luce of Massachusetts had been trying for years to have a statue of Ward made. There were hopes in 1931 that the statue would be dedicated in time for the George Washington Bicentennial the following year. The area chosen for the statue was to be a new traffic circle, specifically made to feature Ward.

Due to the rising costs of bronze, the equestrian design was changed to Ward standing. The designs depicted Ward as "tall, thin, and majestic-looking", reportedly the opposite of his actual features. Meanwhile, the engineering department of Washington, D.C.'s government worked on creating the traffic circle, with plans for American University to expand around it. In June 1935 the CFA approved the statue's final design. In September 1937, the National Capital Parks issued a permit for the statue and announced the traffic circle would be named Ward Circle.

==== Dedication ====
In October 1938, it was announced the recently installed Ward statue, which was completed in July 1936, would be dedicated the following month. It was noted that for many years the number of people who participated in the Revolutionary War and were honored with a statue or memorial in Washington, D.C., were underrepresented compared to the prominently-placed statues from the Civil War. On November 3, 1938, the unveiling and dedication ceremony took place, attended by military and government officials, active military, and members of the public.

A small viewing stand was built inside the circle and Frederic Adrian Delano, chairman of the National Capital Planning Commission, served as head of ceremonies. The event started with the playing of My Country, 'Tis of Thee by the United States Army Band, as a cavalry troop stood at attention. Ward's great-great-great granddaughter pulled a patriotic-colored rope to unveil the statue. The main speech was given by Harvard University's Henry Lee Shattuck, who talked about Ward's life and his contributions during and after the Revolutionary War. Secretary of War Harry Hines Woodring accepted the statue on behalf of the president and the nation. Woodring said "The Army of the United States holds in peculiar honor the man under whose command the forces of liberty were first rallied in Massachusetts." Also in attendance were Crunelle, Gilmore David Clarke from the CFA, Chancellor Joseph M. M. Gray from American University, and former Assistant Attorney General Charles R. Warren.

==== Later history ====
The statue of Ward is one of 14 American Revolution statues that were collectively listed on the National Register of Historic Places on July 14, 1978. The following year the statues were added to the District of Columbia Inventory of Historic Sites on March 3, 1979.

== Location and design ==
=== Location ===
The Ward statue is located in the center of Ward Circle, a traffic circle at the intersection of Massachusetts Avenue NW and Nebraska Avenue NW in the American University Park neighborhood of Washington, D.C. The statue and other areas of the park measure 30,000 square-feet (2,787 sq m). Due to its location in a busy traffic circle, the statue is difficult for pedestrians to visit. The area around the circle is surrounded by American University on three sides, and the United States Department of Homeland Security on the fourth side. The statue and park are owned and maintained by the National Park Service.

=== Design ===
The statue is made of bronze and measures 10-feet (3 m) tall, 5-feet (1.5 m) long, and 4-feet (1.2 m) wide. The granite pedestal, made from Stony Creek granite, shares the same measurements. Ward is depicted standing erect, looking forward, and wearing his Continental Army uniform. The uniform includes a long cape modelled from Ward's actual cape, a double-breasted coat, vest, and boots. His three-cornered hat and gloves are held in his left hand. He is walking forward, with his left foot out in front of the other. His sword handle is barely visible by his left side. At the base of the statue is a cannon ball. Ward's face was modelled from a portrait made by Charles Willson Peale.

The base of the statue bears the inscription:

ARTEMAS WARD

1727–1800
SON OF MASSACHUSETTS
GRADUATE OF HARVARD COLLEGE
JUDGE AND LEGISLATOR
DELEGATE 1780–1781 TO THE CONTINENTAL CONGRESS
SOLDIER OF THREE WARS
FIRST COMMANDER OF THE PATRIOT FORCES

== See also ==
- List of public art in Washington, D.C., Ward 3
- National Register of Historic Places in Washington, D.C.
- Outdoor sculpture in Washington, D.C.
