= Fort Zumwalt Park =

Park in O'Fallon, Missouri, U.S.

Coordinates: 38°47′47″N 90°42′30″W

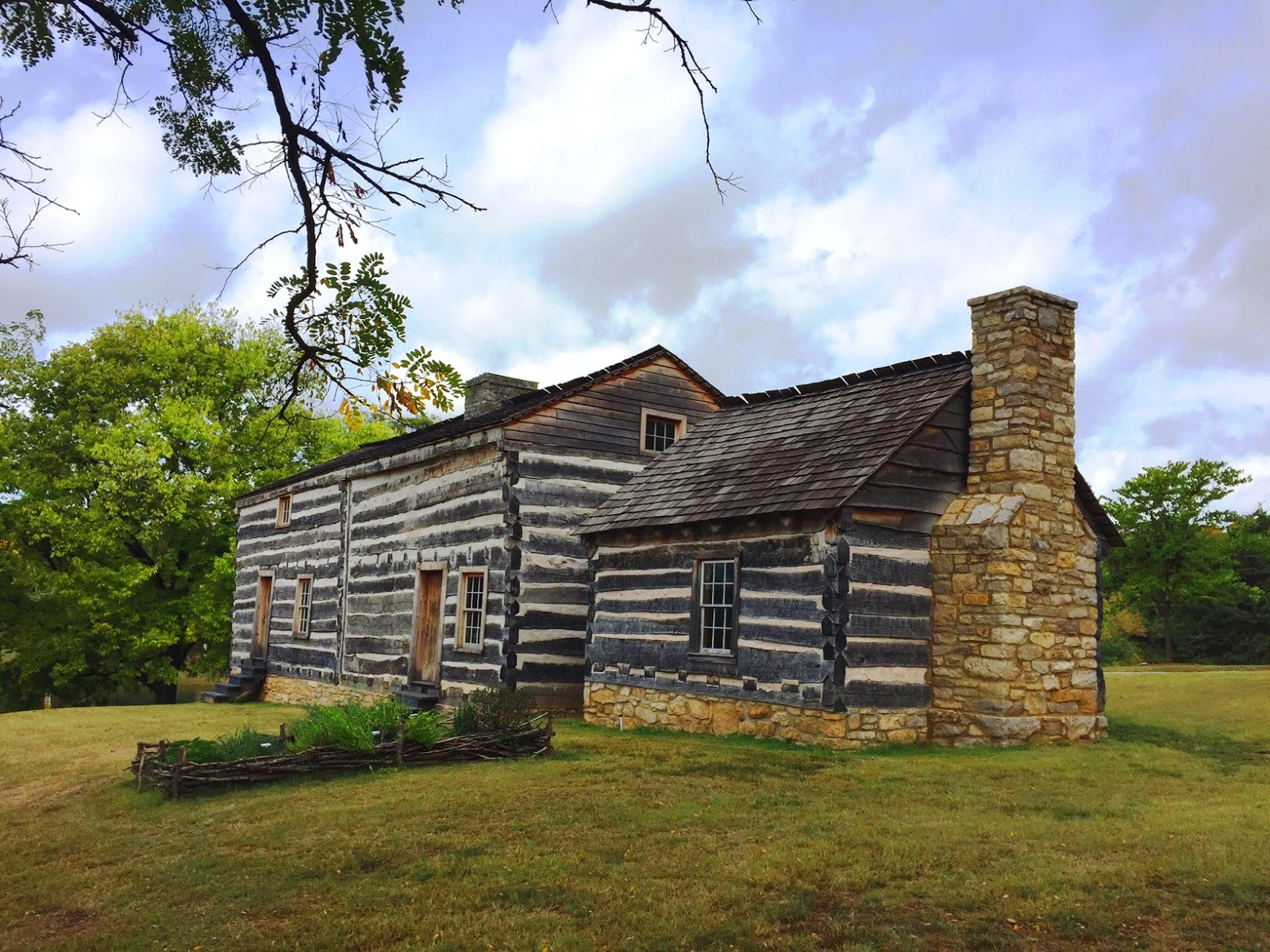
- Reconstructed Fort Zumwalt, 2017

- Location within Missouri Location within the United States
- Location: O'Fallon, Missouri

History
- Built: 1798 (Zumwalt), 1884 (Heald)
- Rebuilt: 2015 (Zumwalt)

Site notes
- Area: 48 acres (19 ha)
- Restored: 2001 (Heald)
- Restored by: O'Fallon Community Foundation
- Governing body: City of O'Fallon

Fort Zumwalt Park is a park in O'Fallon, Missouri, that features the rebuilt homestead fort of Jacob Zumwalt.

The park's total area is 48 acres (19 ha) with 4-acre (1.6 ha) Lake Whetsel, a picnic pavilion, a shelter house, and a children's playground with equipment. The lake is open for fishing from February though October (7 am–7 pm). Fort Zumwalt Park hosts O'Fallon's annual Celebration of Lights, a drive-through display of light decorations, every Christmas season, and is home to the St. Charles Model Railroad Club. The site also includes the Darius Heald Home. Formerly a state park since 1939, the State of Missouri sold the property to the City of O'Fallon in 1978 for one dollar. The Heald Home was restored in 2001, and reconstruction of Zumwalt's fort was completed in 2015.

== Zumwalt's Fort ==
The hill on which Jacob Zumwalt built his home was part of a nearly 384-acre (155 ha) Spanish land grant that he accepted in 1796, with land on both sides of Belleau Creek. Zumwalt was a Revolutionary War veteran, one of only a few who settled in Saint Charles County, Missouri. His family originally came from Pennsylvania and spent some time in Kentucky before moving to Missouri.

Zumwalt's extended family helped him complete the first section of the home in 1798, with additions made in following years. It is believed to have been the first hewn-log house north of the Missouri River, and its four rooms, stone foundation, double fireplace, and other Pennsylvania German construction details set it apart from other homes. The family was of Methodist faith and the first Methodist sacrament in Missouri was in the home in 1807.

The home was called "Zumwalt's Fort" because area families gathered there for protection from raids during the War of 1812. Seven such homestead forts were built in St. Charles County. Area fighting with Native Americans ended by 1815, when peace treaties were signed nearby.

Zumwalt raised 10 children from two wives, and in 1817, moved adjacent to a son-in-law in Callaway County, Missouri, where he died in 1820.

=== After Zumwalt ===
Upon moving, Zumwalt sold his homestead fort to disability-discharged US Army officer Nathan and Rebekah Heald for $1000 in 1817. Their son Darius was born there in 1822, and lived in the homestead for most of his life. After the Heald family owned the land for nearly 100 years, it was sold outside the family in 1914, and then split among three owners. The portion that contained the fort was sold to Fred Gentemann, who converted it into use as a barn. In September 1929, primarily through efforts by two Heald family members, a commemorative marker was placed along nearby U.S. Highway 40 (aligned then through St. Peters to St. Charles) to share the history of the site. In 1936, a state historical group presented resolutions to petition the state legislature to buy 87 acres (35 ha) surrounding the fort for a state park. The following year, funds to expand the state park system were approved, and in 1938, the state filed condemnation proceedings to acquire 40.63 acres (16.44 ha) for the park, which it bought from three owners (including Gentemann) for $9,000 in early 1939.

Initially, the state park was used mostly by O'Fallon residents, though it gradually became a popular camping and relaxation point for travelers on U.S. 40 (and later Interstate 70). The central chimney was rebuilt in 1960, apparently from only reclaimed pieces of the fort's foundations, as no stone was ordered for the job. As part of an archaeological survey of all its parks, and with initial plans for reconstruction of the fort, the state of Missouri sponsored excavations around parts of the fort for several weeks in 1975, the findings of which suggested the prior presence of a smokehouse and blacksmithing activity. In 1978, the state sold the park to the City of O'Fallon for $1, requiring that it continue to be maintained as a public park. In 2005, with permission by the city, the O'Fallon Community Foundation resumed long-delayed plans to restore the fort, and hired the Archaeology Research Center of St. Louis to complete excavations around it.

=== Reconstruction and legacy ===
All that remained of the original Zumwalt home as of September 2008 was its internal stone chimney with two fireplaces, one on either side. In 2008, the O'Fallon Community Foundation began work on the reconstruction of Zumwalt's home. On September 30, 2009, the foundation held a ribbon cutting to celebrate the completion of the first phase of the reconstruction of Jacob Zumwalt's homestead fort. The plan was to have all three phases of Zumwalt's log structures reconstructed by 2012 in timing with the bicentennial of the War of 1812. By the end of 2013, however, delays had put the completion time in doubt. The reconstructed fort opened in 2015.

The local Fort Zumwalt School District R-II was renamed after this fort in 1966; the district's first high school has been named for the fort since 1960. A total of four high schools in the district now have the Fort Zumwalt name, appended with their relative compass directions. In the 1970s, a spring on the property was dammed to form Lake Whetsel, named for Ed Whetsel, a member of the O'Fallon Parks Board.

== Heald Home ==
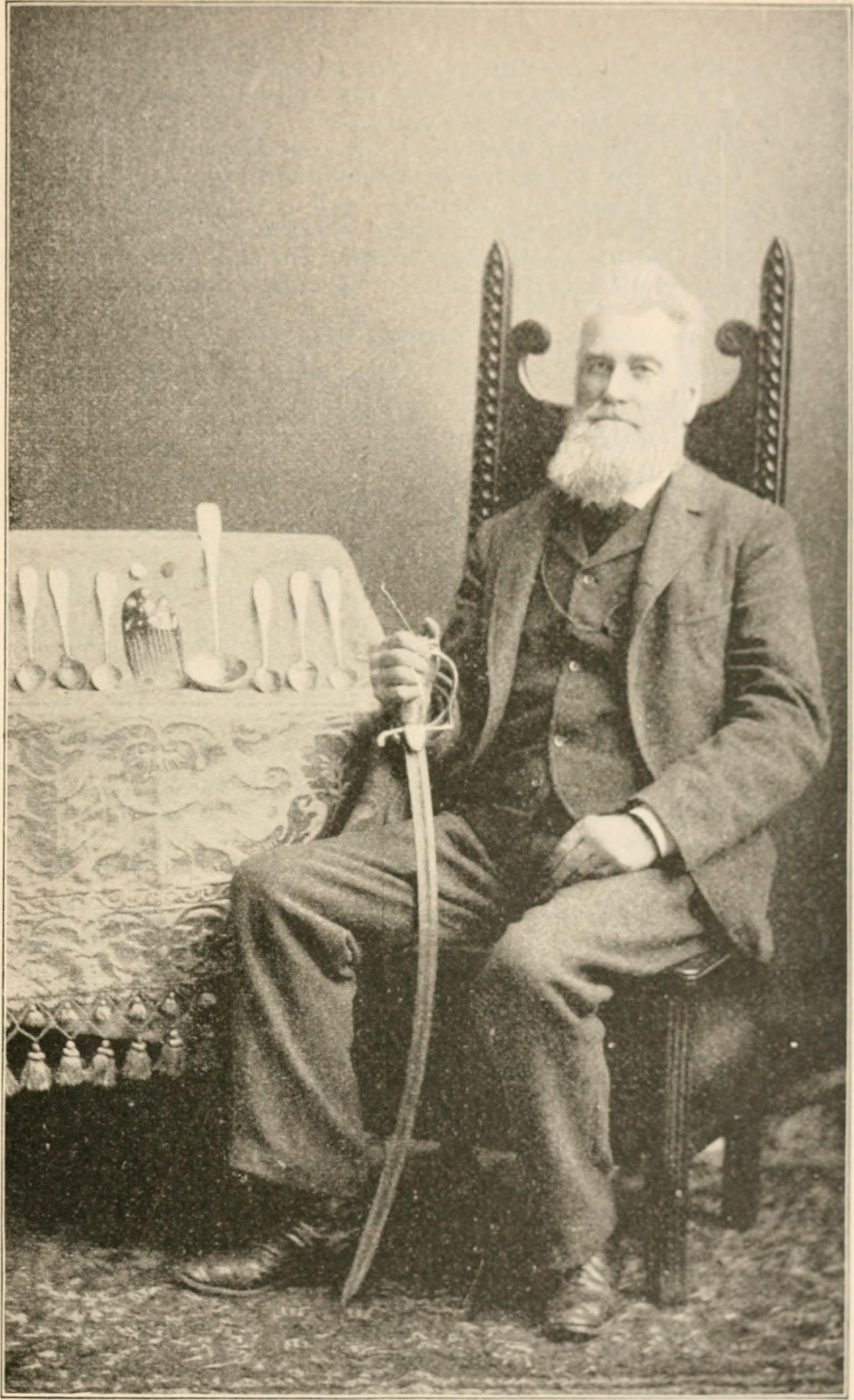
Darius Heald in 1893, holding his father's sword among other relics

Darius Heald built a new large brick home near the fort in 1884 and called it "Stony Point". Its architecture has been referred to as "German-Italianate-Victorian" – primarily of German construction, with Italian influence in the porch columns and balcony railing. Heald died in 1904, and a tornado destroyed the upper floor of the house in 1915. Before selling the home in 1916, the family rebuilt its upper story with original recovered bricks, though it was about a foot shorter in height. A state park superintendent is known to have lived in the home in 1959. Beginning in 1961, the state removed what had been the Heald's brick smokehouse, and took its bricks to Arrow Rock for reuse, apparently in restoration of the Dr. Hall House. After decades of use and nonuse, the Heald house was in need of repair, and was restored in 2001 by the City of O'Fallon and the O'Fallon Community Foundation.

== See also ==
- Parks in Greater St. Louis
