= Haym Salomon =

Polish-born Jewish American merchant (1740–1785)

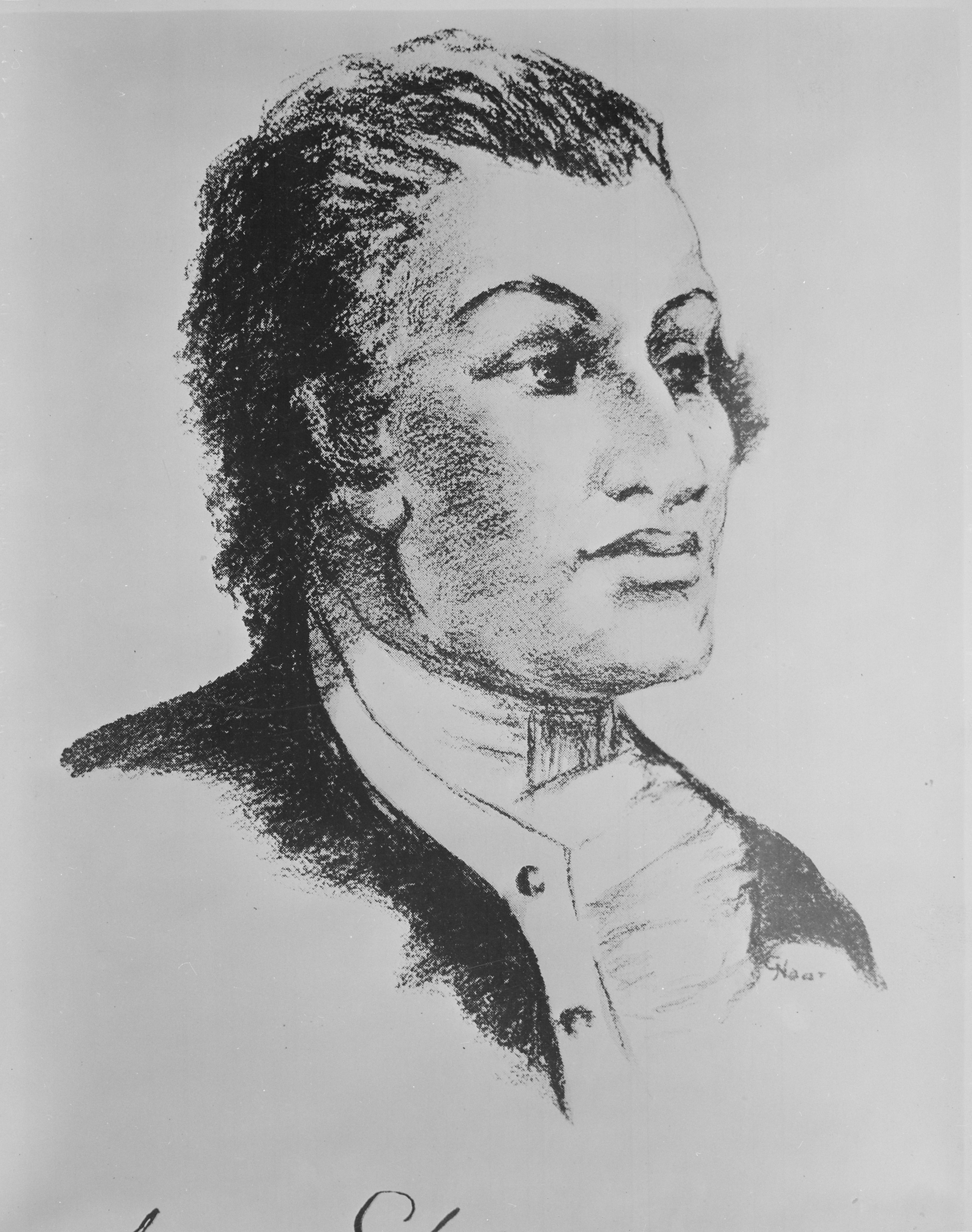
- An illustration of Salomon
- Born: April 7, 1740; Leszno, Polish–Lithuanian Commonwealth (modern day Poland)
- Died: January 6, 1785 (aged 44); Philadelphia, Pennsylvania, U.S.
- Resting place: Mikveh Israel Cemetery, Philadelphia
- Occupation: Broker
- Known for: Financier and broker during the American Revolutionary War

Haym Salomon (also Solomon; April 7, 1740 – January 6, 1785) was a Polish-born American merchant best known for his actions during the American Revolution, where he was one of the primary financiers for the Continental Congress.

Born to a Jewish family in Leszno, Polish–Lithuanian Commonwealth, Salomon studied finance in Western Europe before emigrating to New York City in 1775. After the American Revolutionary War broke out in the same year, Salomon supported the Patriots by providing financial services while working alongside financier Robert Morris, the Superintendent of Finance of the United States, and risked his life as a member of the Sons of Liberty, leading to multiple arrests by the British for espionage.

Salomon helped convert French loans into hard currency by selling bills of exchange on Morris' behalf, and also brokered large donations to the Patriot cause. This included a critical $20,000 loan in 1781 that enabled George Washington’s decisive Yorktown campaign, a turning point for American independence. From 1781 to 1784, Salomon helped provide over $650,000 ($15.1 million in 2025). He was also an advocate for religious liberty by co-founding Philadelphia’s Mikveh Israel synagogue and challenging discriminatory laws. Despite donating his entire fortune to the Continental Army and several Founding Fathers of the United States, Salomon was still in debt when he died of a heart attack in Philadelphia in 1785, due to the failure of government officials and private lenders to repay the debt they owed him.

== Early life and education ==
Haym Salomon was born on April 7, 1740 in Leszno, Polish–Lithuanian Commonwealth to a Sephardic Jewish family descended from Spanish and Portuguese Jews who gradually migrated to Poland following the expulsion of Jews from Spain in 1492. Although most Jews in Central and Eastern Europe spoke Yiddish, it has been claimed that because Salomon left Poland with his family while he was still young, he could not read and write Yiddish; Sephardic Jews typically spoke Judaeo-Spanish (Ladino), a language based on Hebrew and Spanish, rather than Yiddish. In his youth, he studied Hebrew, which gave him a reading knowledge of the language, though not a writing capability.

During his adult travels in Western Europe, Salomon acquired a knowledge of finance and fluency in some of the languages of the day. He returned to Poland in 1770, but left for England two years later in the wake of the First Partition of Poland. In 1775, Salomon immigrated to New York City, where he established himself as a financial broker for American merchants engaged in overseas trade.

== Revolutionary activity ==
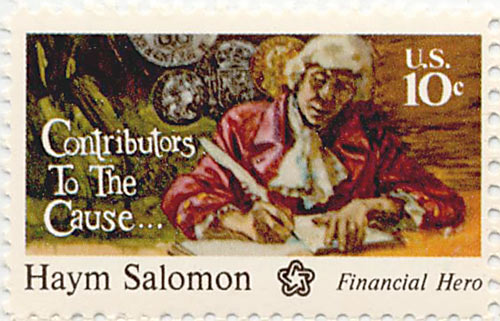
Haym Salomon commemorative stamp (1975)

Sympathizing with the Patriot cause, Salomon joined the New York branch of the Sons of Liberty. In September 1776, he was arrested by the British as a spy, but quickly pardoned. However, the British authorities detained him for 18 months on a boat as an interpreter for Hessian troops, since Salomon could speak German. Salomon used his new position to help prisoners of war from the Continental Army escape, encouraged Hessian troops to desert, and collaborated with Hercules Mulligan and Cato to carry out other acts of espionage. In 1778, Salomon was arrested again, convicted of espionage, and sentenced to death. He eventually escaped and made his way with his family to Philadelphia, where the Continental Congress was located.

=== Financing of the American Revolutionary War ===
Once resettled in Philadelphia, Salomon resumed his activities as a broker. He became the agent to the French consul as well as the paymaster for all French forces in North America. In 1781, Salomon began working extensively with Robert Morris, the newly appointed Superintendent of Finance of the United States.

From 1781 to 1784, records show that Salomon's fundraising and personal lending helped provide over $650,000 ($15.1 million in 2025) in financing to General George Washington in his war effort. However, Salomon's most meaningful financial contribution came immediately prior to the Siege of Yorktown.

In August 1781, the Continental Army trapped Lieutenant General Charles Cornwallis in the Virginia coastal town of Yorktown. George Washington and the main army, and Comte de Rochambeau with his French army, decided to march from the Hudson Highlands to Yorktown and deliver the final blow. However, Washington's war chest was completely empty, as was that of Congress. Without food, uniforms and supplies, Washington's troops were close to mutiny.

Washington determined that he needed at least $20,000 to finance the campaign. When Morris told him there were no funds and no credit available, Washington said: "Send for Haym Salomon". Salomon raised $20,000, through the sale of bills of exchange. With that contribution, Washington conducted the Yorktown campaign, which proved to be the final battle of the Revolution.

Salomon brokered the sale of a majority of the war aid from France and the Dutch Republic, selling bills of exchange to American merchants. Salomon also personally supported various members of the Continental Congress during their stay in Philadelphia, including James Madison and James Wilson. He requested below-market interest rates, and he never asked for repayment.

Salomon is believed to have granted outright bequests to men who he thought were unsung heroes of the revolution who had become impoverished during the war. One example is Bodo Otto, a senior surgeon in the continental army. Otto joined the army at the age of 65 and served for the entire war. Among other things, he established the hospital at Valley Forge, where he often used his own funds to purchase medical supplies. Due to Salomon's bequest, Otto was able to rebuild his medical practice in Reading, Pennsylvania, at war's end.

The Treaty of Paris, signed on September 3, 1783, ended the Revolutionary War but not the financial problems of the newly established nation. America's war debt to France was never properly repaid, which was part of the cascade of events leading to the French Revolution.

=== Jewish community ===
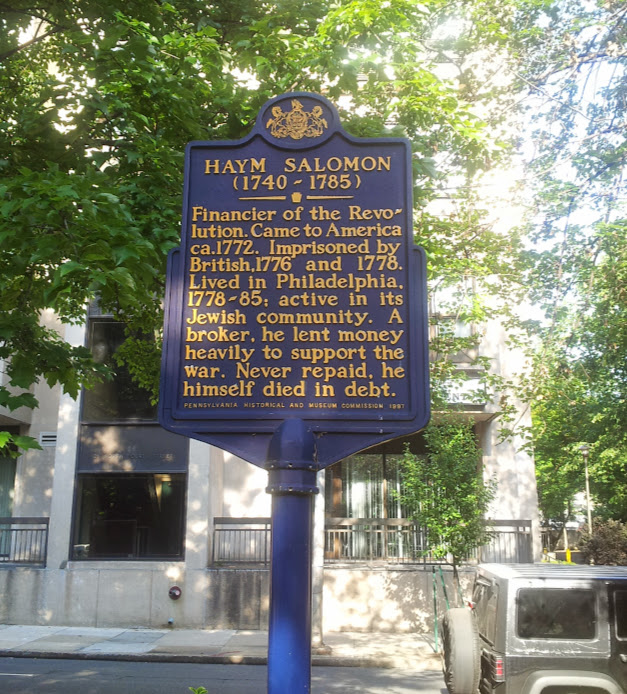
Pennsylvania Historical Marker, 44 N 4th Street, Philadelphia (July 2014)

Salomon was involved in Jewish community affairs, being a member of Congregation Mikveh Israel in Philadelphia, and in 1782 made the largest individual donation toward the construction of its main building. In 1783, Salomon was among the prominent Jews involved in the successful effort to have the Pennsylvania Council of Censors remove the religious test oath required for office-holding under the State Constitution. These test laws were originally written to disenfranchise the Quaker majority (Quakers objected to taking oaths at all), but many were caught up in this anti-democratic ploy. It was Salomon's old friend Robert Morris who actually introduced legislation to end the test laws in Pennsylvania. In 1784, Salomon answered antisemitic slander in the press by stating: "I am a Jew; it is my own nation; I do not despair that we shall obtain every other privilege that we aspire to enjoy along with our fellow-citizens."

=== Freemasonry ===
Like Washington and many prominent men associated with the American revolution, Salomon was a Freemason. He received his first two degrees in Philadelphia's Lodge No. 2, Ancient York Rite in 1764. After the war, Salomon's Master Mason degree was conferred in 1784 (possibly in Maryland Lodge, No. 27), the year before his death.

== Death ==
Salomon died suddenly and in poverty on January 6, 1785, in Philadelphia. Due to the failure of governments and private lenders to repay the debt incurred by the war, his family was left penniless at his death at age 44. The hundreds of thousands of dollars of Continental debt Salomon bought with his own fortune were worth only about 10 cents on the dollar when he died.

Salomon's obituary in the Independent Gazetteer read, "Thursday, last, expired, after a lingering illness, Mr. Haym Salomon, an eminent broker of this city, was a native of Poland, and of the Hebrew nation. He was remarkable for his skill and integrity in his profession, and for his generous and humane deportment. His remains were yesterday deposited in the burial ground of the synagogue of this city."

== Legacy ==
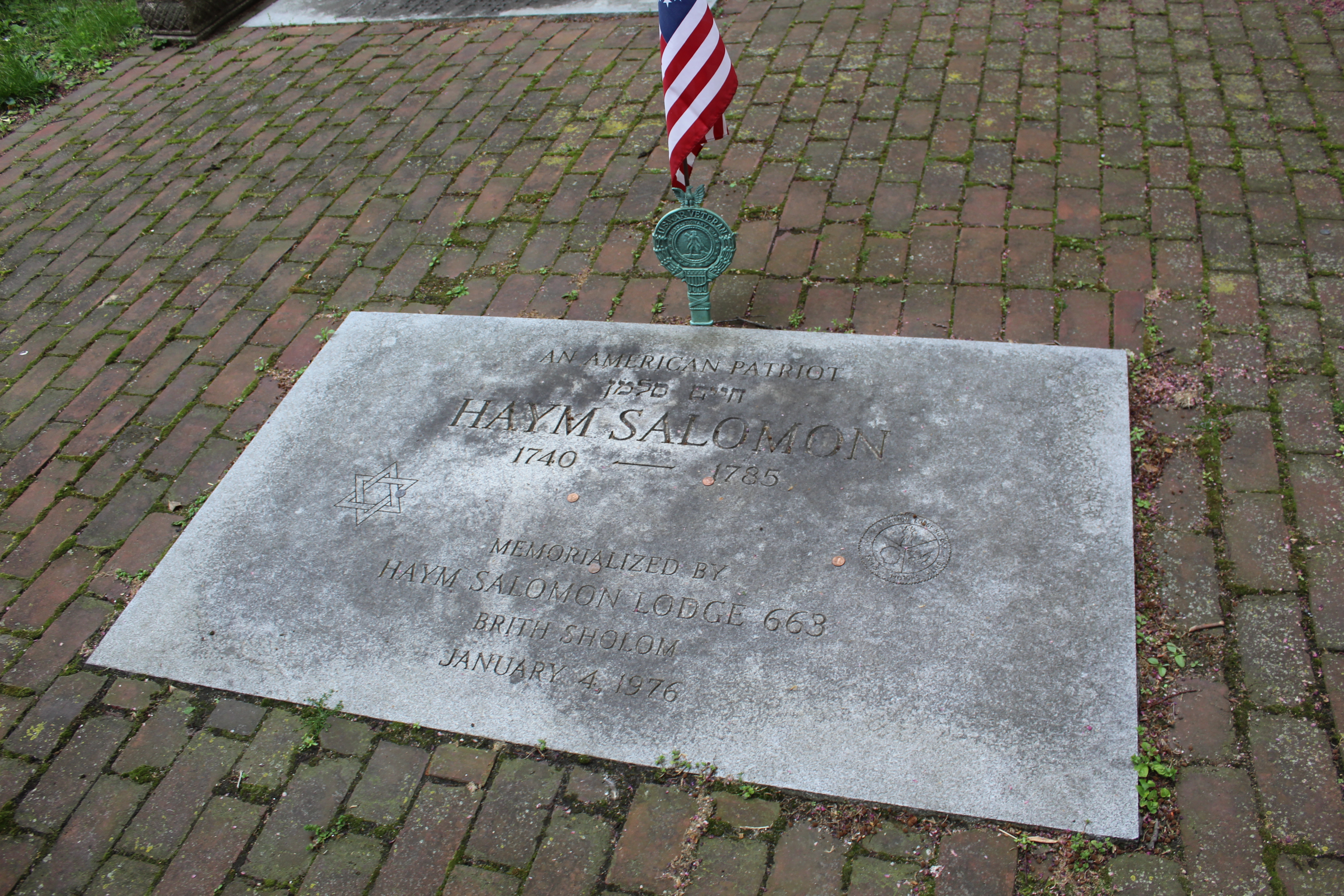
Haym Salomon marker, Mikveh Israel Cemetery, Philadelphia

The gravesite of Haym Salomon is located in the Mikveh Israel Cemetery in Philadelphia. Though it is unmarked, there are two plaque memorials. The east wall has a marble tablet that was installed by his great-grandson, William Salomon, and a granite memorial is set inside the cemetery gate. In 1980, the Haym Salomon Lodge #663 of the fraternal organization B'rith Sholom sponsored a memorial in the Mikveh Israel Cemetery. A blue ribbon panel and committee, including Robert S. Whitman, Sidney Bruskin and Marvin Abrams, all lodge past presidents; and Philadelphia residents, arranged for the renovation of the walls and walkways of the cemetery. They then arranged for and oversaw the installation of a large, engraved memorial marker of Barre Granite just inside the cemetery gates, inscribed "An American Patriot". A memorial bronze marker with an American flag was installed by Robert S. Whitman, marking the dedicated space for the American patriot.

=== Commemoration ===
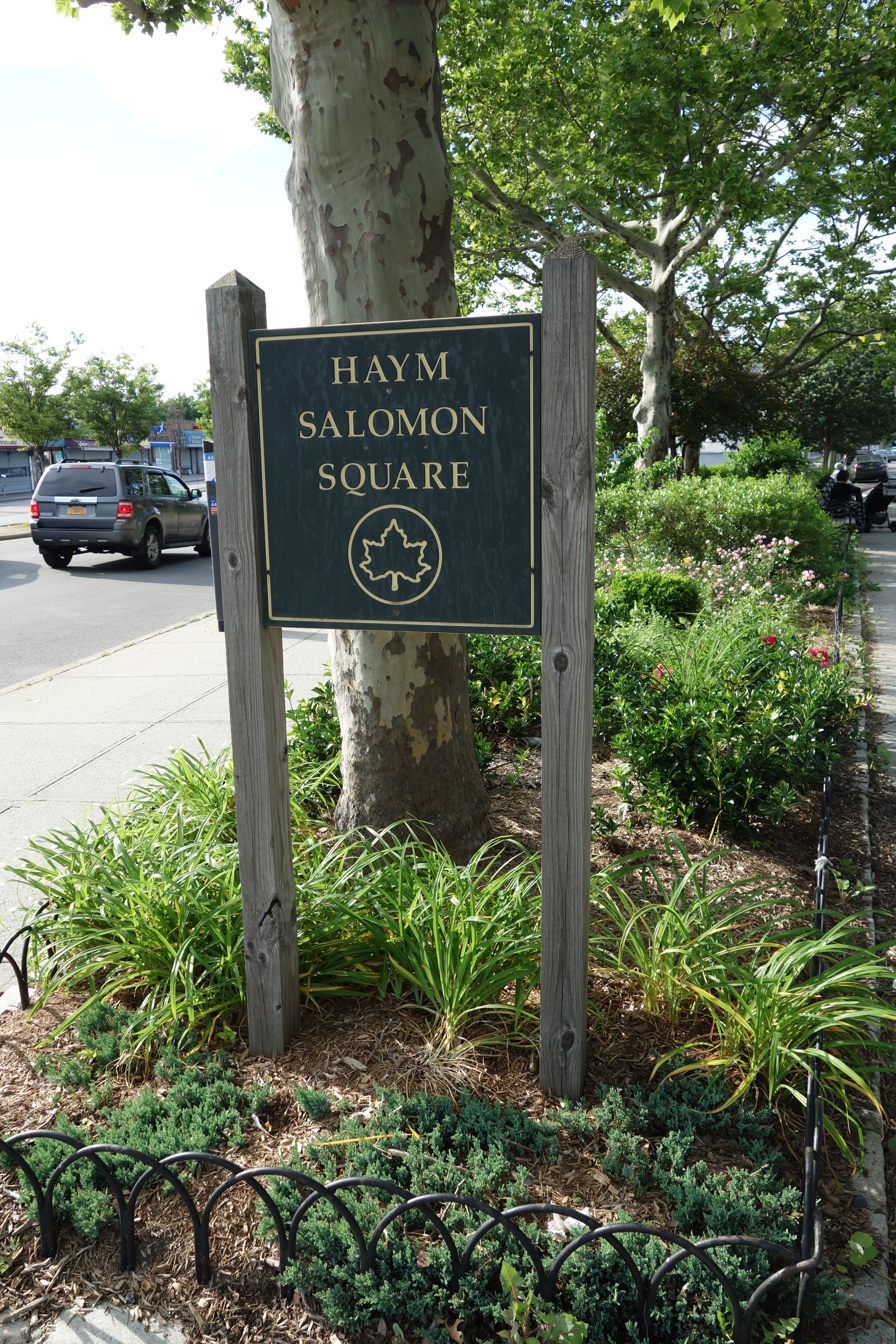
Haym Salomon Square in Kew Gardens Hills, Queens, New York City

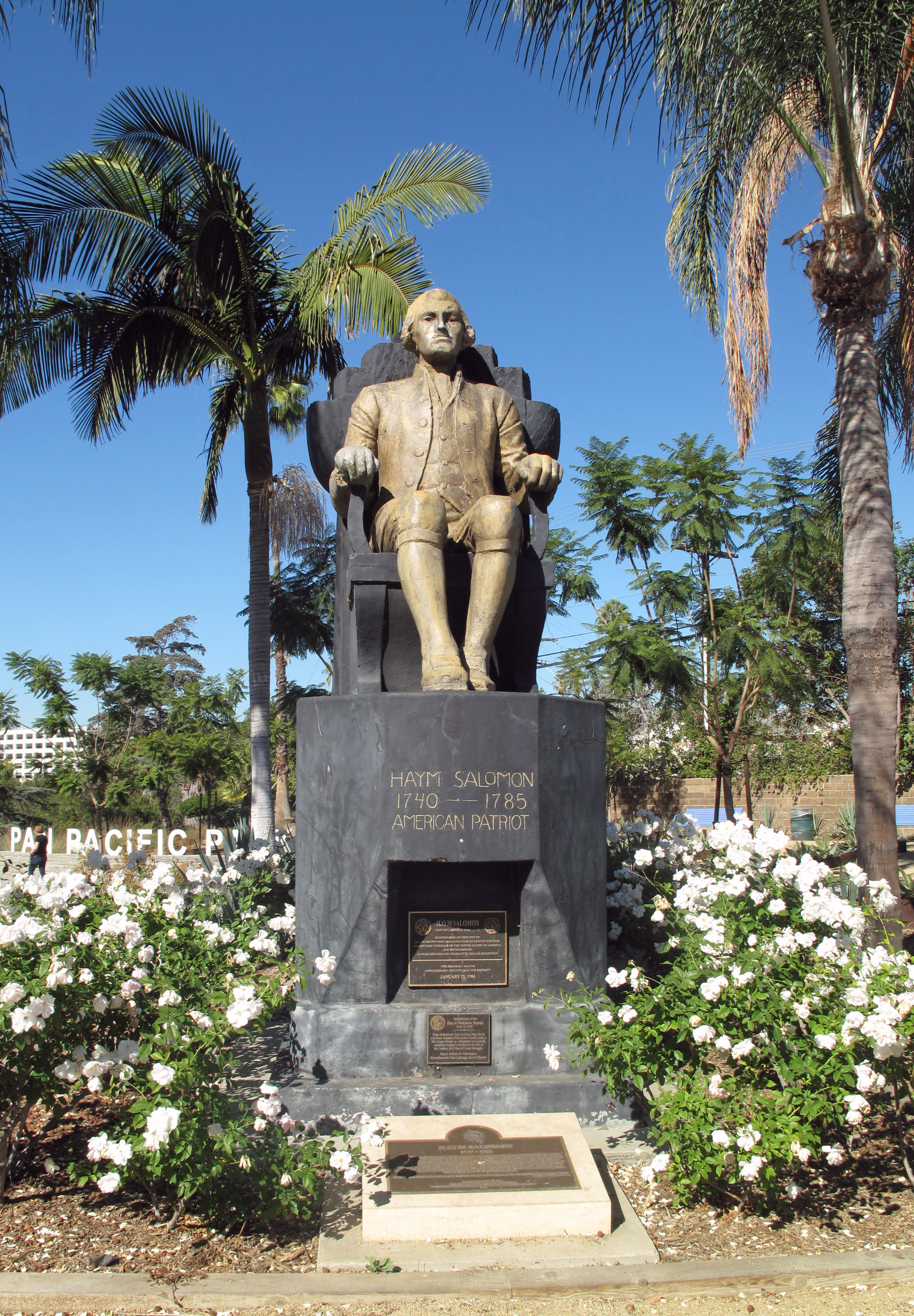
Haym Solomon statue in Pan-Pacific Park, Los Angeles

There is a legend that during the design process of the Great Seal of the United States, Washington asked what compensation Salomon wanted in return for his financial contributions to the American Revolutionary War. He replied that "he wanted nothing for himself but that he wanted something for his people". While there is no evidence, there is a theory that the 13 stars representing the colonies on the seal were arranged in the shape of the Star of David in commemoration of Solomon's contributions. This appears to have little basis in fact, however, although it is oft-repeated.

- In 1893, a bill was presented before the 52nd United States Congress ordering a gold medal be struck in recognition of Salomon's contributions to the United States.
- In 1939, Warner Brothers released Sons of Liberty, a short film starring Claude Rains as Salomon.
- In 1941, the writer Howard Fast wrote a book Haym Salomon, Son of Liberty. That same year, the Heald Square Monument, a sculpture designed by Lorado Taft was erected in today's Heald Square in downtown Chicago. Taft began the work but died in 1936. It was completed by his associate, Leonard Crunelle. The monument depicts George Washington flanked by Salomon and Robert Morris and grasping hands with both men.
- In 1946, a memorial statue was erected to Salomon at Hollenbeck Park in Los Angeles. The statue was rededicated in 2008 at Pan-Pacific Park in the Fairfax District, where it can be found on the corner of Gardner and Third Street.
- In 1975, the United States Postal Service issued a commemorative stamp honoring Haym Salomon for his contributions to the cause of the American Revolution. This stamp, like others in the "Contributors to the Cause" series, was printed on the front and the back. On the glue side of the stamp, the following words were printed in pale green ink: "Financial Hero – Businessman and broker Haym Salomon was responsible for raising most of the money needed to finance the American Revolution and later to save the new nation from collapse".
- The Congressional Record of March 25, 1975 reads:

When Morris was appointed Superintendent of Finance, he turned to Salomon for help in raising the money needed to carry on the war and later to save the emerging nation from financial collapse. Salomon advanced direct loans to the government and also gave generously of his own resources to pay the salaries of government officials and army officers. With frequent entries of "I sent for Haym Salomon", Morris' diary for the years 1781–84 records some 75 transactions between the two men.

- In World War II, the United States liberty ship SS Haym Salomon was named in his honor. The ship was launched on May 17, 1943. It was sold for private use in 1947 and scrapped in 1971.
- The Haym Salomon Nursing Home in Brooklyn, New York, is named in his honor.
- Haym Salomon Square is located Kew Gardens Hills, Queens, New York City.
- Haym Salomon Memorial Park in Frazer, Pennsylvania, is a Jewish cemetery in suburban Philadelphia. It is the final resting place of musician Jim Croce.
- The Haym Salomon Center is a nonprofit organization located in Northbrook, Illinois, that advocates for pro-Western, pro-democracy values.

== See also ==
- Haym Salomon, Son of Liberty, a 1941 historical novel by Howard Fast
