= Haym Salomon Nursing Home =

Nursing home & medical rehabilitation facility

Coordinates: 40.59489°N 73.99650°W

Haym Salomon Nursing Home is a long-term nursing home and short-term medical rehabilitation facility located in Bensonhurst, Brooklyn.

== History ==
It was named after Haym Salomon (1740—1785), a Jewish businessman and political financial broker who was involved in the American Revolutionary War. The facility, also known as Haym Salomon Home for Nursing and Rehabilitation, moved from an earlier location. In 1982, The New York Times described it as bankrupt. In the following decades, they continued operation, even through the COVID-19 pandemic.

== See also ==
- Sephardic Home for the Aged
