= Ward Circle =

Traffic circle in Northwest, Washington, D.C.

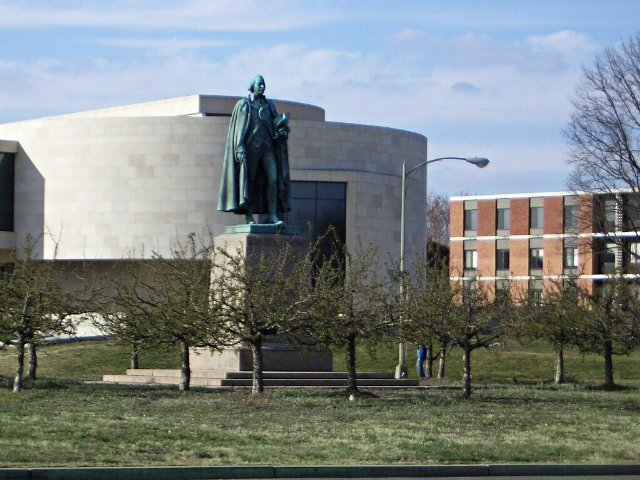
- Ward Circle and Katzen Arts Center in 2006
- Interactive map of Ward Circle
- Namesake: Artemas Ward
- Type: Traffic circle
- Owner: District of Columbia
- Maintained by: DDOT, National Park Service
- Location: Washington, D.C., U.S.
- Coordinates: 38°56′16″N 77°05′09″W

Ward Circle is a traffic circle at the intersection of Nebraska and Massachusetts Avenues in Northwest, Washington, D.C. The circle, totaling 30,243 sq ft (2,809.7 m^{2}), is owned and administered by the National Park Service through its Rock Creek Park unit. On three sides is the campus of American University, while the fourth is occupied by the Nebraska Avenue Complex, a U.S. government facility.

The circle was constructed and landscaped in the 1930s to display the 27.5-foot (8.4 m) bronze, memorial statue of Artemas Ward. Ward was the first Commander-in-Chief in the American Revolutionary War. Sculptor Leonard Crunelle created the statue over a three-year period, while the base and pedestal were built by J. F. Manning Co. The pedestal is made from Stony Creek granite.

The president and fellows of Harvard University donated the $50,000 to cover the cost of the statue. The donation fulfilled the terms of the will of Artemus Ward, an alumnus of Harvard and the great-grandson of Maj. Gen. Artemus Ward. The statue was unveiled on November 3, 1938, by Mrs. Wesley Feick, the great-great-granddaughter of Maj. Gen. Ward. Secretary of War Harry Hines Woodring spoke at the unveiling.

Located on the west side of the circle, the home of American University's School of Public Affairs was named for and is still sometimes known as Ward Circle. In 2017, the official name of the building was changed to Kerwin Hall after former university president Cornelius M. Kerwin. On the North side of the circle is American University's Katzen Arts Center.

== See also ==
- List of circles in Washington, D.C.
