= Sephardic Home for the Aged =

Nursing home & medical rehabilitation facility

Coordinates: 40.76692°N 73.98218°W

Sephardic Home for the Aged (also known as Sephardic Home for Nursing and Rehabilitation and Sephardic Nursing and Rehabilitation Center) was a long-term nursing home and short-term medical rehabilitation facility. Its Brooklyn location now houses King David Center for Nursing and Rehabilitation, and, like the prior operators, services both Ashkenazic and Sephardic patients and residents.

== History ==
Sephardic opened in 1951, with their initial focus on those elderly whose primary language and food preferences reflected that of the Sephardic community.

Decades later they renamed, under different management, to King David. The facility continued operating during the Coronavirus period.

== See also ==
- Haym Salomon Nursing Home
