= Heald Square =

Square in Chicago

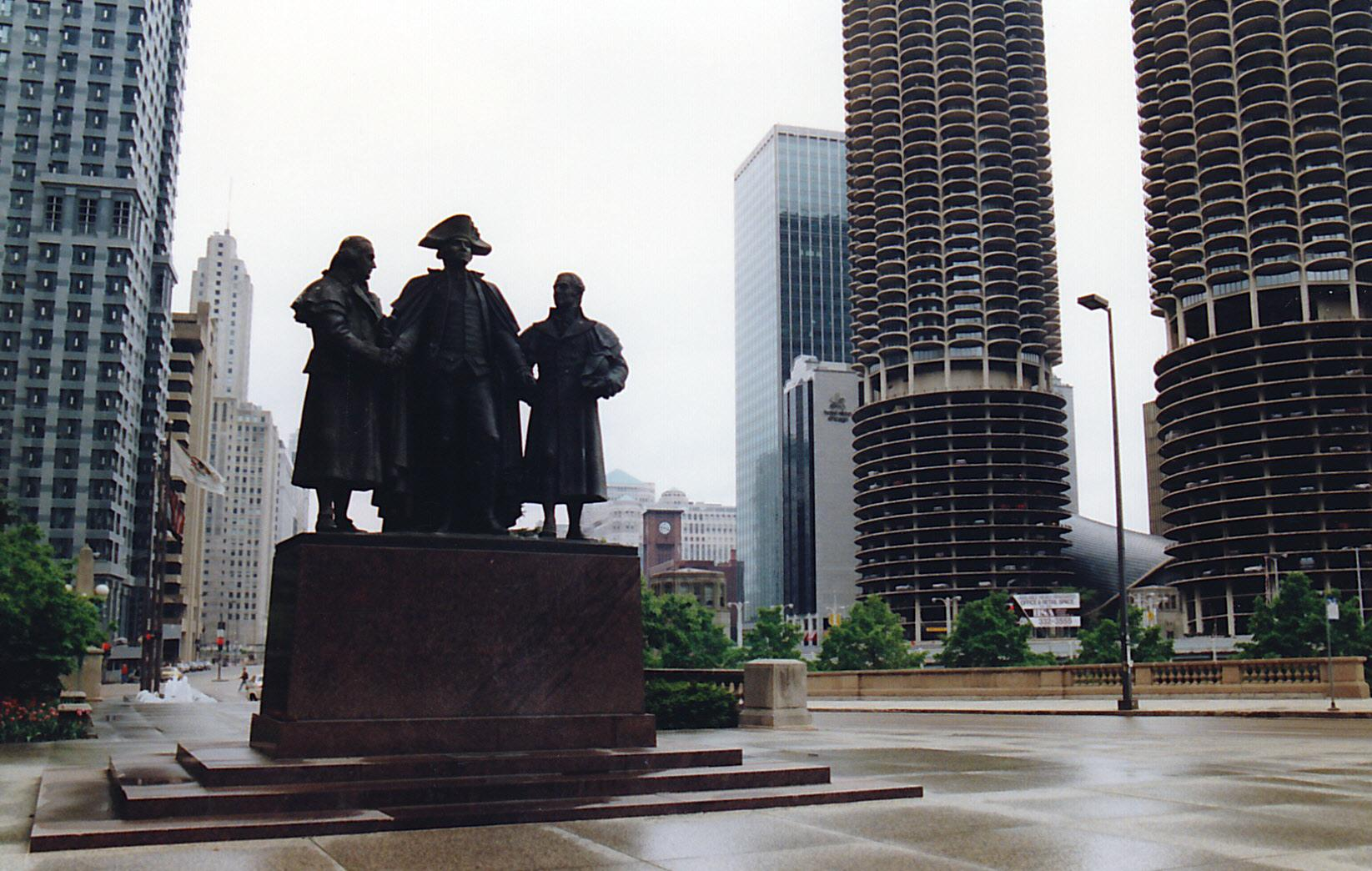
- Heald Square in 2011
- Maintained by: City of Chicago
- Location: Chicago, Illinois, U.S.
- Coordinates: 41.88719°N 87.626848°W

Heald Square is a public square in Chicago, Illinois, United States. It is located at the corner of East Wacker Drive and North Wabash Drive, as the latter crosses the Chicago River via the Irv Kupcinet Bridge, in the Michigan–Wacker Historic District of Chicago's Loop community area. The square is named for Captain Nathan Heald, commander of Fort Dearborn from 1810 to 1812.

The square's most prominent feature is the Heald Square Monument, which depicts General George Washington and the two principal financiers of the American Revolution: Robert Morris and Haym Salomon.
