= Pan-Pacific Park =

Park in Los Angeles, California, United States

Pan Pacific Park
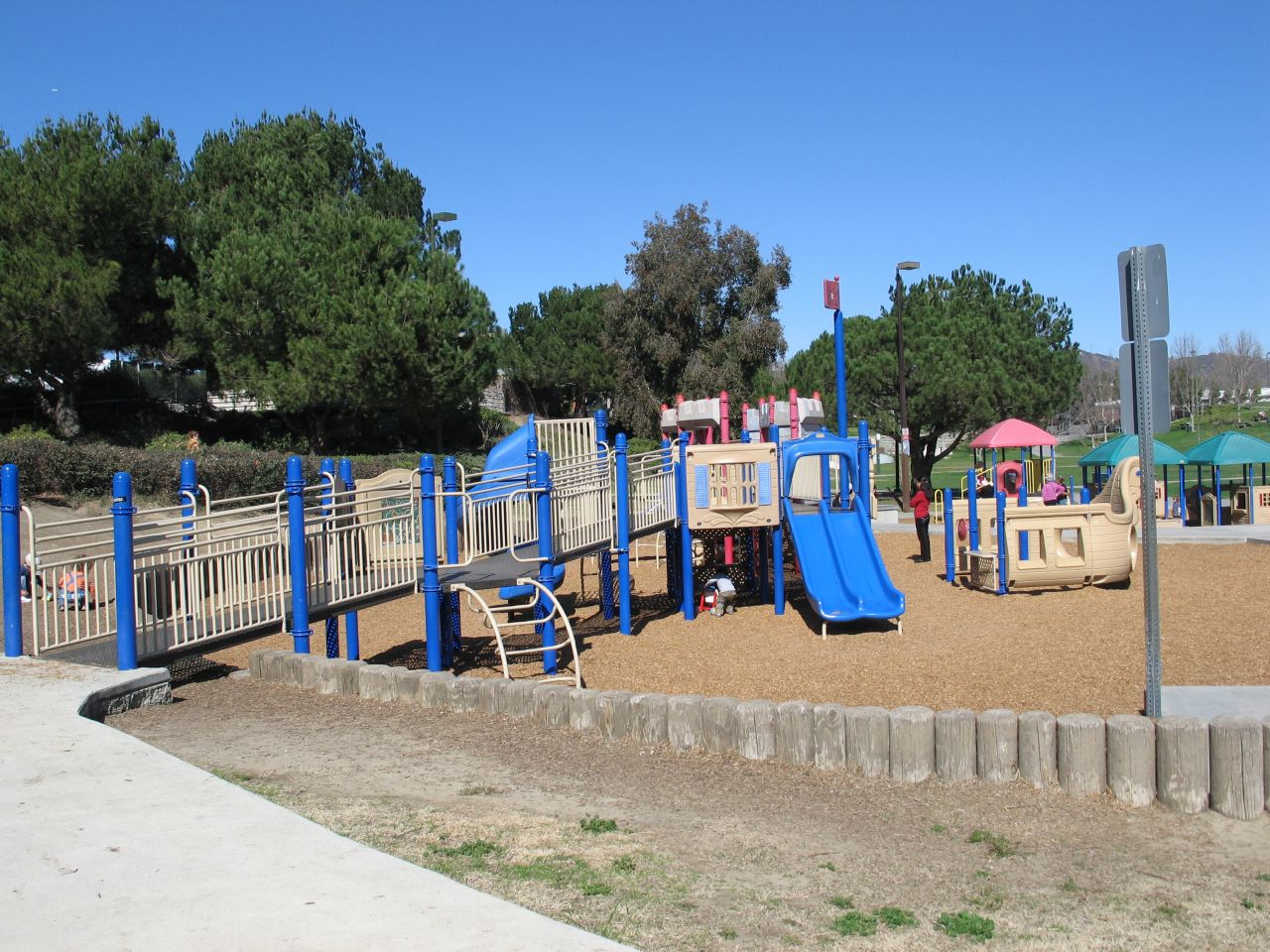
- Interactive map of Pan Pacific Park
- Type: Municipal
- Location: 7600 Beverly Blvd, Los Angeles, California 90036
- Coordinates: 34.073246°N 118.354849°W

Pan Pacific Park is a large public park in Los Angeles, California which hosts a variety of public amenities as well as a Holocaust museum. The park is managed by the City of Los Angeles Department of Recreation and Parks.

== Location ==
The park is located at 7600 Beverly Blvd in the Fairfax district, a historically Jewish neighborhood of Los Angeles. It is bounded by Beverly Boulevard to the north, West 3rd Street to the south, The Grove Drive to the west, and South Gardner Street to the east.

The Grove shopping center and CBS Studios/Television City are across the street from the park, on the west side of The Grove Dr.

== History ==
Ernest E. Debs was an early proponent of the Pan Pacific Park project before his retirement from the Los Angeles County Board of Supervisors in 1974, after which his successor, Edmund Edelman, took on the project. The park's development broke ground in 1981.

The historic Pan Pacific Auditorium, before it burned down in 1989, was located on part of the land that became Pan Pacific Park. In 2002, the park's Recreation Center was built on the same site, with a spire similar to the characteristic spires of the historic auditorium.

== Facilities ==
The park hosts the following facilities:

- Swimming pool (outdoor/seasonal), baseball fields, basketball courts, volleyball courts, soccer/multipurpose sports field, children's playground, walking/jogging paths, small outdoor amphitheater, restrooms, parking lots.
- Pan Pacific Park Recreation Center, opened in 2002 on the former site of the Pan Pacific Auditorium.
- Pan Pacific Senior Activity Center, a senior citizen center with a gym, dining hall, computer lab, and auditorium.
- Holocaust Museum LA, formerly known as Los Angeles Museum of the Holocaust, founded in 1961 and located underground at Pan Pacific Park since 2010; temporarily closed as of May 2026, but scheduled to reopen in the same location as part of the new Goldrich Cultural Center on June 14, 2026.
- Statue of Haym Salomon, Jewish immigrant who financed and raised funds essential to the American Revolution, in the southeast corner of the park at the intersection of W 3rd St & S Gardner St.

Additionally, the Fairfax branch of the Los Angeles Public Library borders the park on S Gardner St.
