= Heald Square Monument =

Sculpture by Lorado Taft

Coordinates: 41.88722°N 87.62685°W

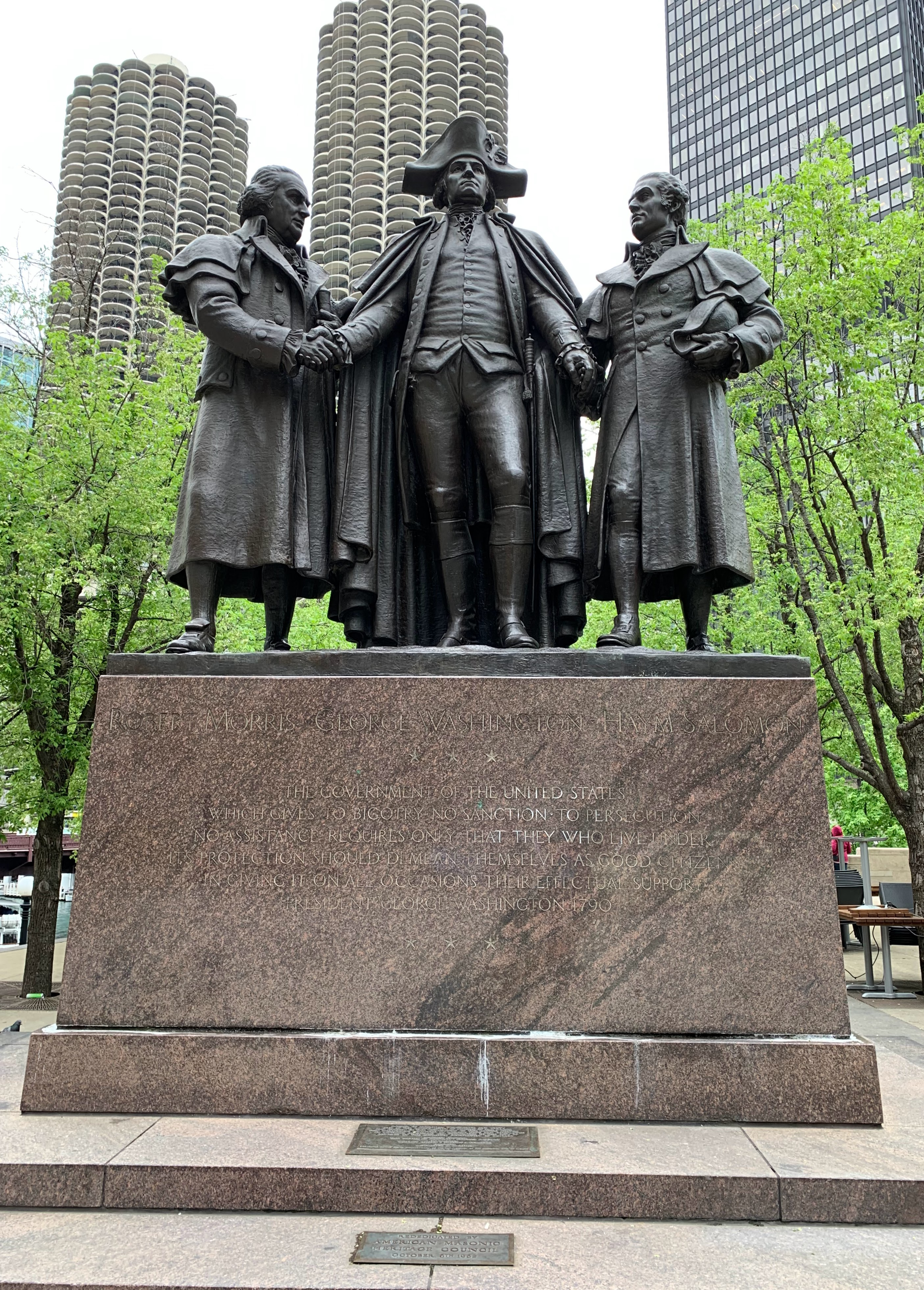
- Artist: Lorado Taft and Leonard Crunelle
- Year: 1936-1941
- Type: Bronze
- Location: Wacker Drive, Chicago, Illinois, United States

The Heald Square Monument is a bronze sculpture by Lorado Taft in Heald Square, Chicago, Illinois, United States. It depicts General George Washington and the two principal financiers of the American Revolution: Robert Morris and Haym Salomon. Following Taft's 1936 death, the sculpture was completed by his associates Leonard Crunelle, Nellie Walker and Fred Torrey.

Heald Square is located in the Michigan–Wacker Historic District of Chicago's Loop community area. The square was named for Captain Nathan Heald, commander of Fort Dearborn from 1810 to 1812.

The sculpture was designated a Chicago Landmark on September 15, 1971.

== See also ==
- List of public art in Chicago
- List of statues of George Washington
- List of sculptures of presidents of the United States
