= Haym Salomon, Son of Liberty =

- First edition
- Author: Howard Fast
- Language: English
- Genre: Historical novel
- Publisher: Julian Messner
- Publication date: 1941
- Publication place: United States
- Media type: Print (Hardback & Paperback)
- Pages: 243 pages

Haym Salomon, Son of Liberty is a historical novel written in 1941 by Howard Fast. The novel is about Haym Salomon, a major financier to the American cause during the American Revolution.
