= Leonard Crunelle =

American sculptor

Leonard Crunelle (8 July 1872 in Lens, Pas-de-Calais – 10 September 1944 in Chicago) was a French-born American sculptor especially known for his sculptures of children. Crunelle immigrated with his family to the United States and worked as a coal miner in Decatur, Illinois. Lorado Taft discovered him as a youth and brought him to Chicago where he was an apprentice to the sculptors decorating the 1893 World's Fair Horticultural Exhibit. He studied at the Art Institute of Chicago with Taft.

Crunelle often used his own four children as models, and they helped him in making statues. In 1908-1910 he created four statues of children entitled "Crane Girl", "Turtle Boy", "Dove Girl", and "Fisher Boy", with each child standing with the associated animal at its feet. The statues were originally placed in Chicago's Humboldt Park, then relocated in the 1960s to four circular fountains near the corners of Buckingham Fountain in Grant Park.

== Gallery ==
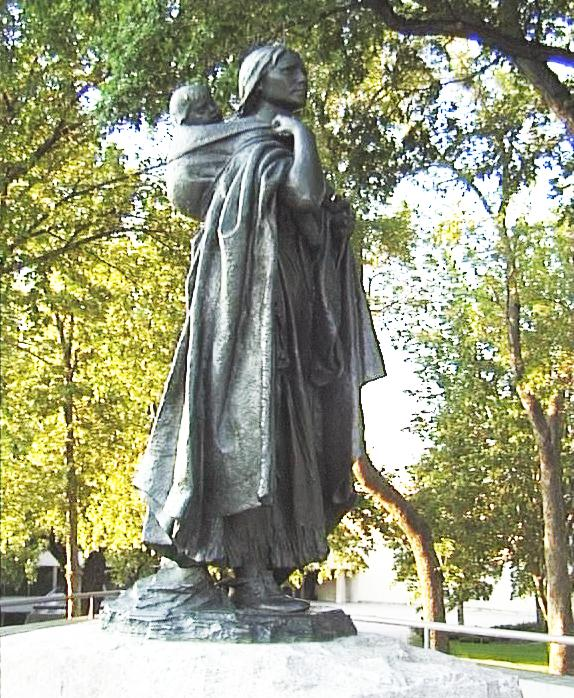
Sakakawea (1904–10), North Dakota State Capitol, Bismarck. A 2003 casting is at the U. S. Capitol in Washington, D.C.

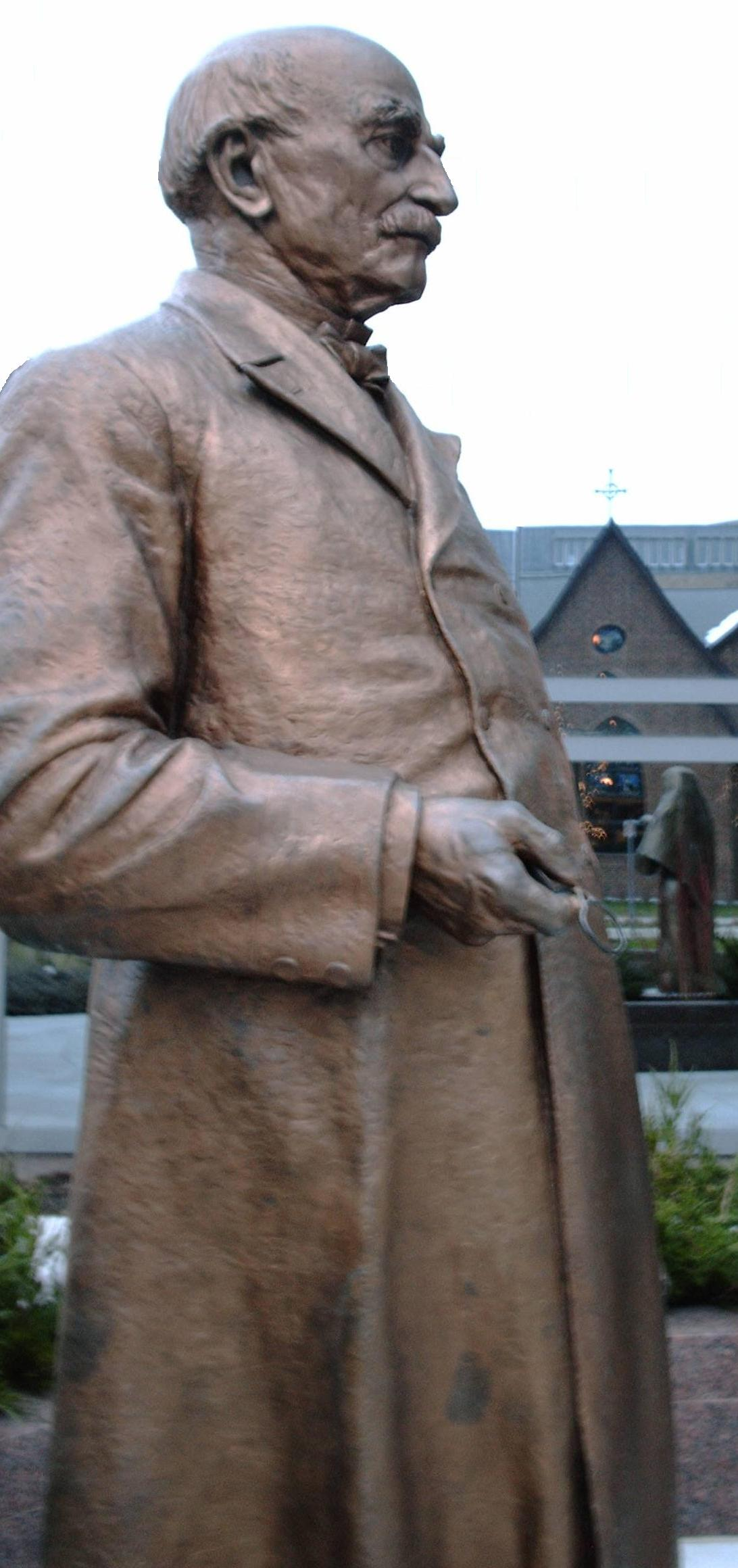
Dr. William Worrall Mayo (1911), Mayo Clinic, Rochester, Minnesota.

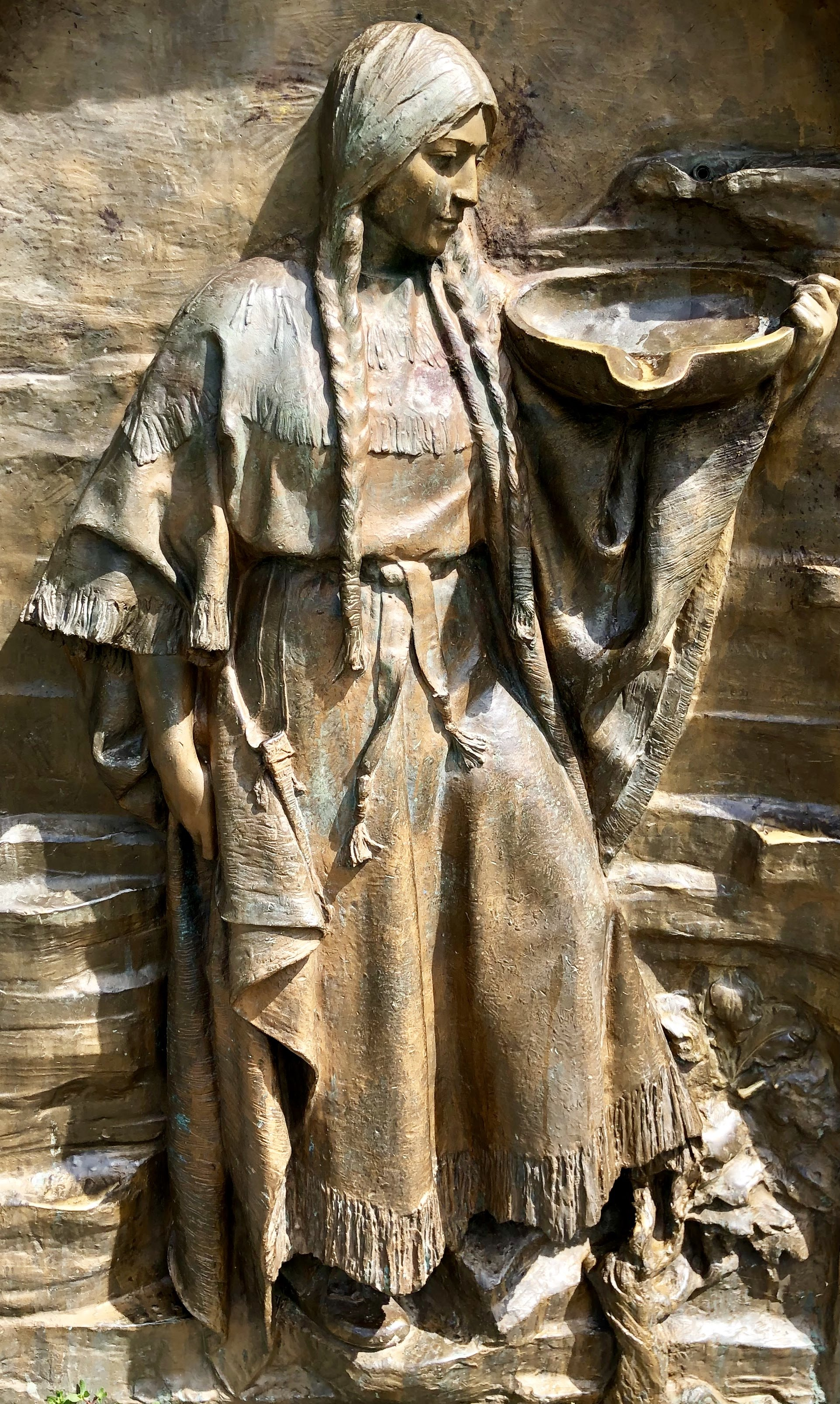
Potosa, Daughter of Meskwaki Chief, Peosta (1914), Jackson Park, Dubuque, Iowa.

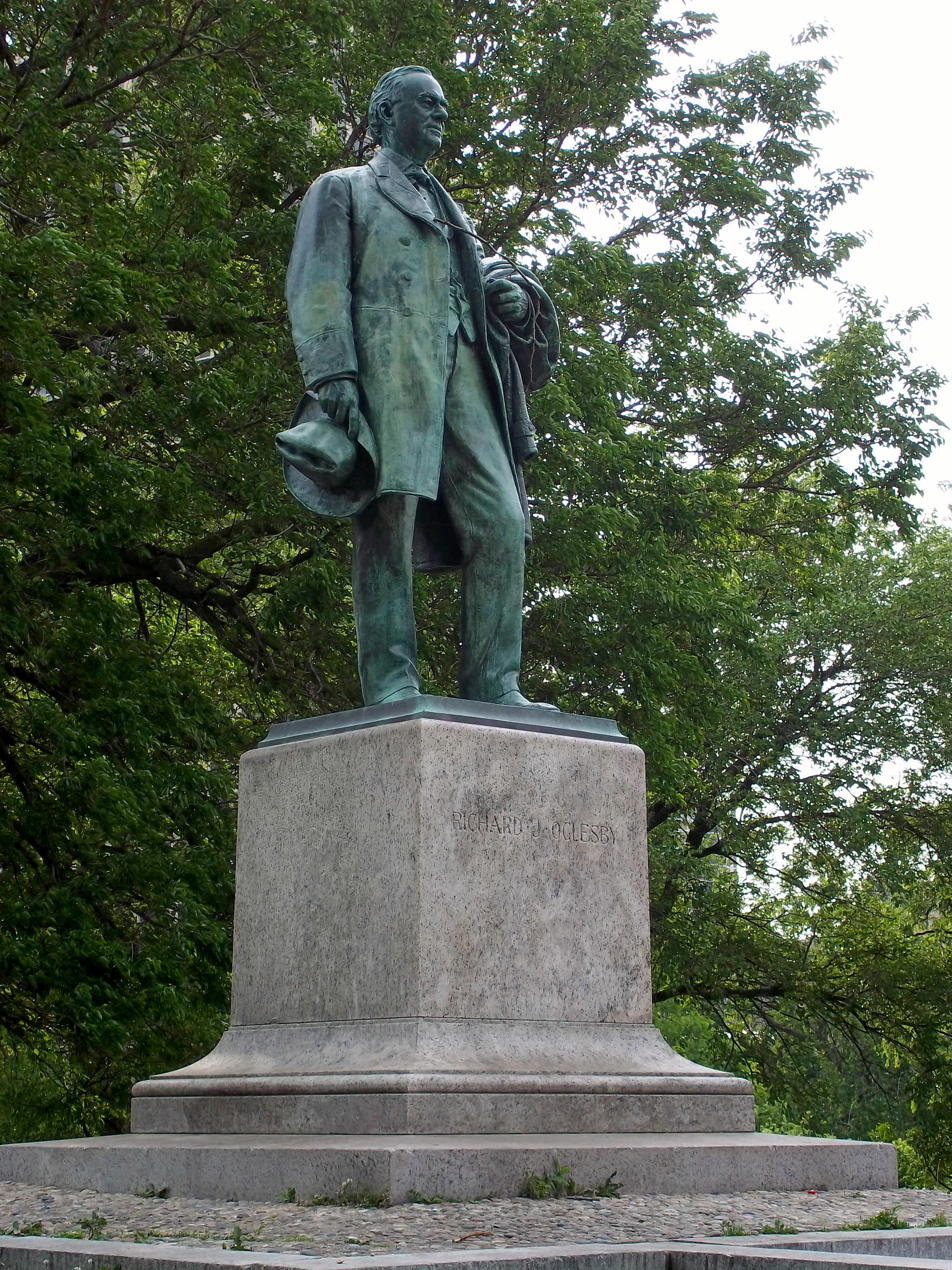
Statue of Richard J. Oglesby (1919), Lincoln Park, Chicago, Illinois.

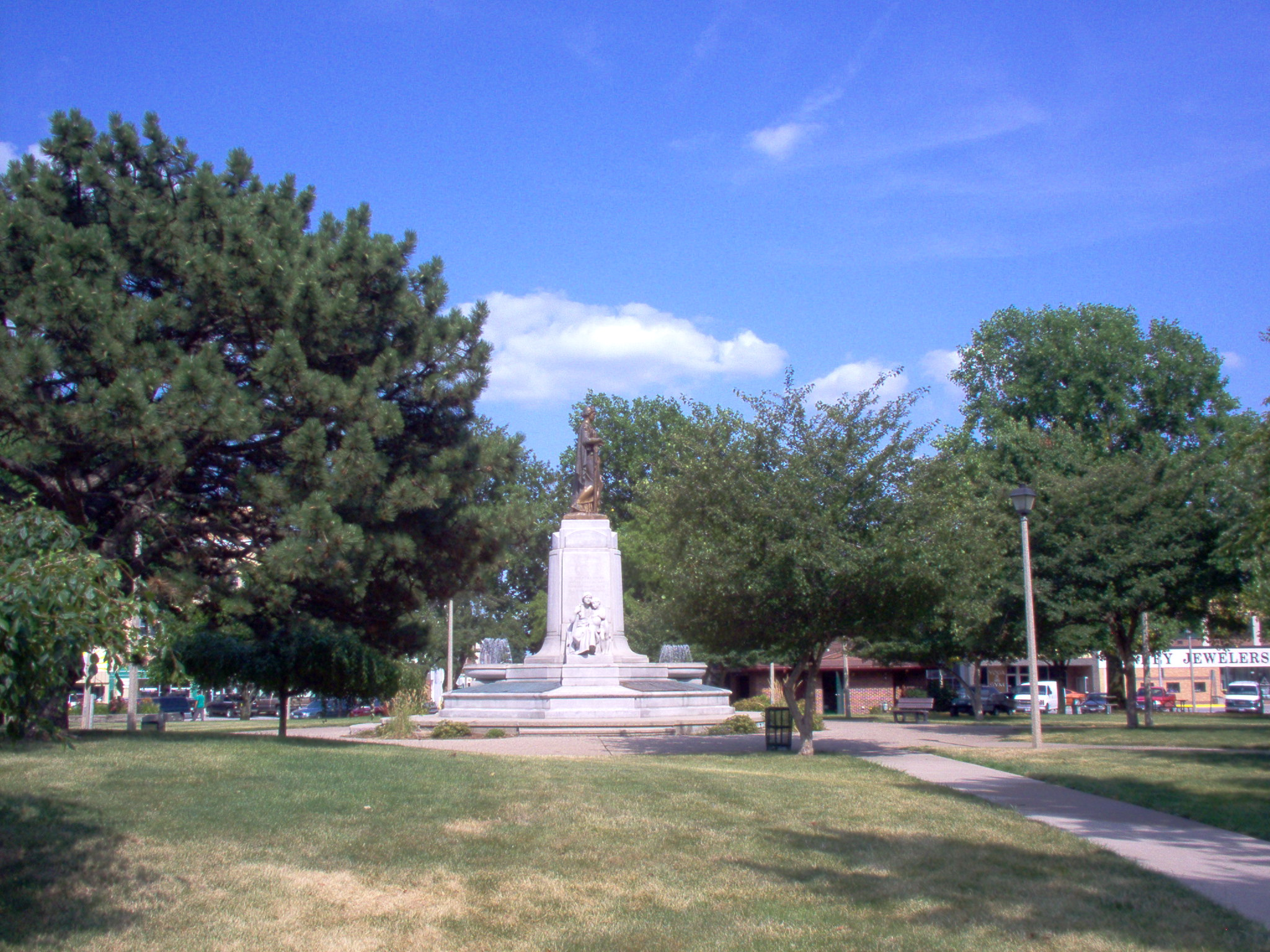
Civil War Monument (1920), Jacksonville Square, Jacksonville, Illinois.

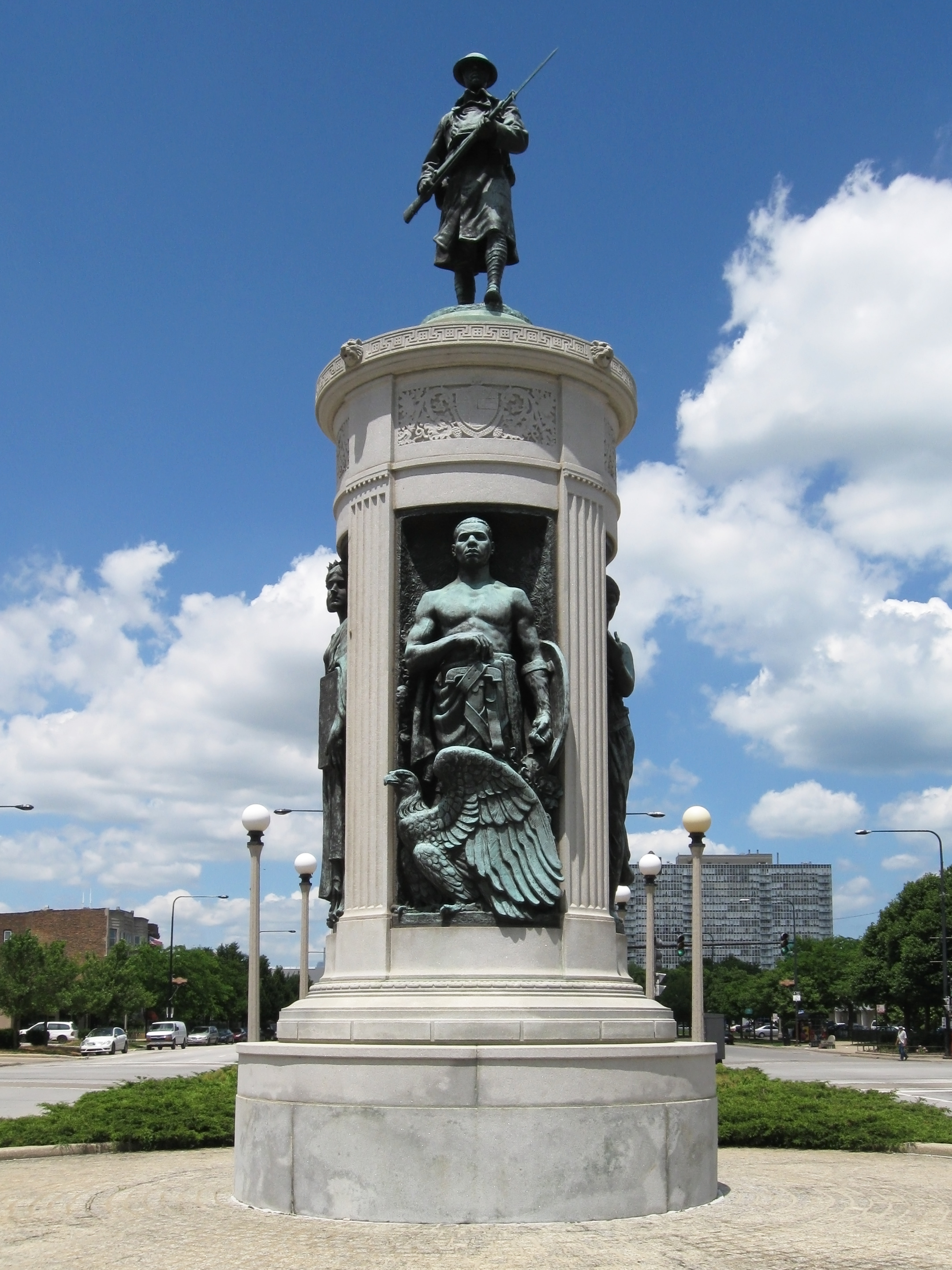
Victory Monument, aka World War I Black Soldiers' Memorial (1927), Chicago, Illinois.

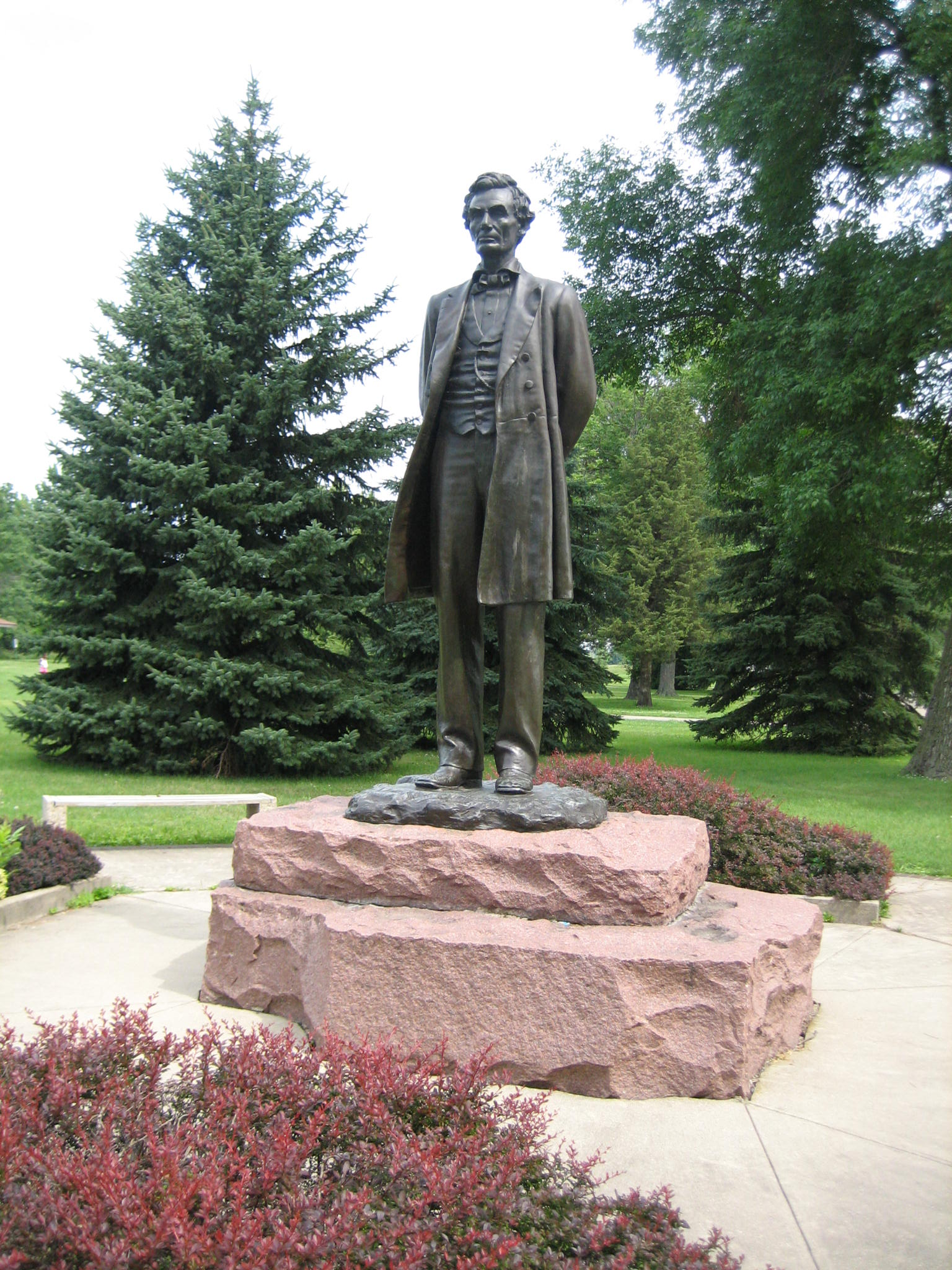
Lincoln the Debater (1928–29), Taylor Park, Freeport, Illinois.

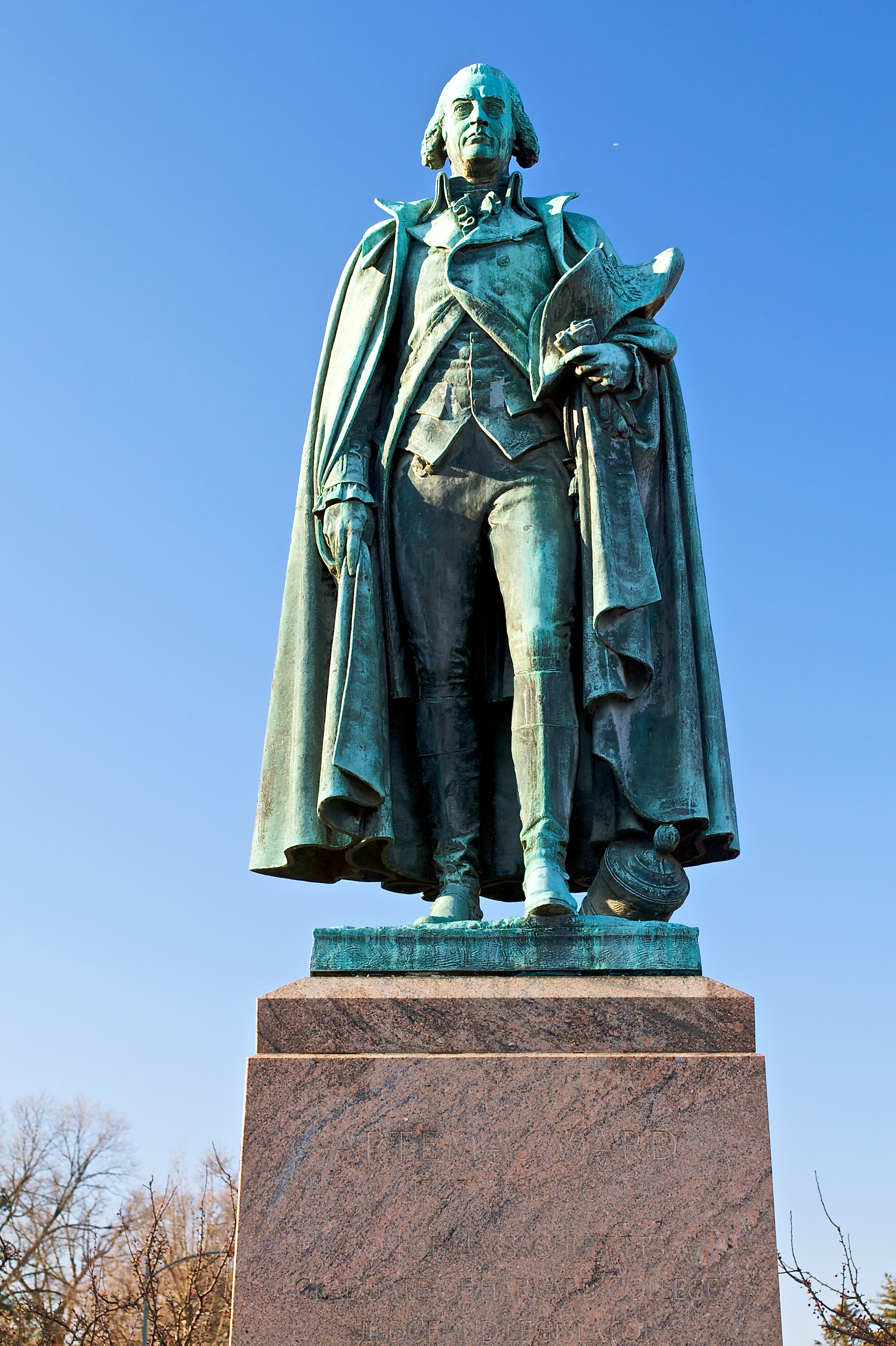
Statue of Artemas Ward (1936–38), Ward Circle, Washington, D.C.

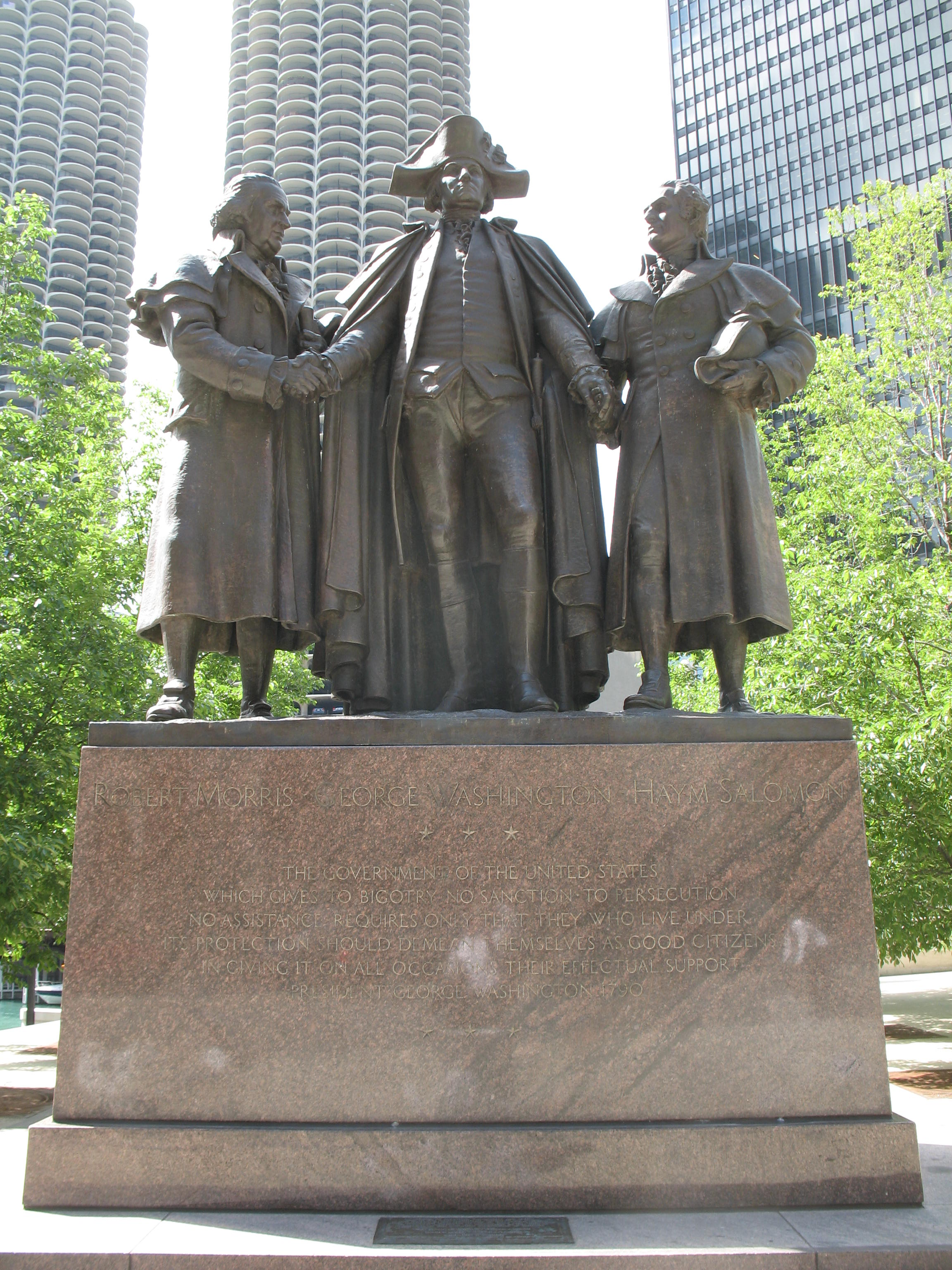
Heald Square Monument (1936–41), Chicago, Illinois. Begun by Lorado Taft.

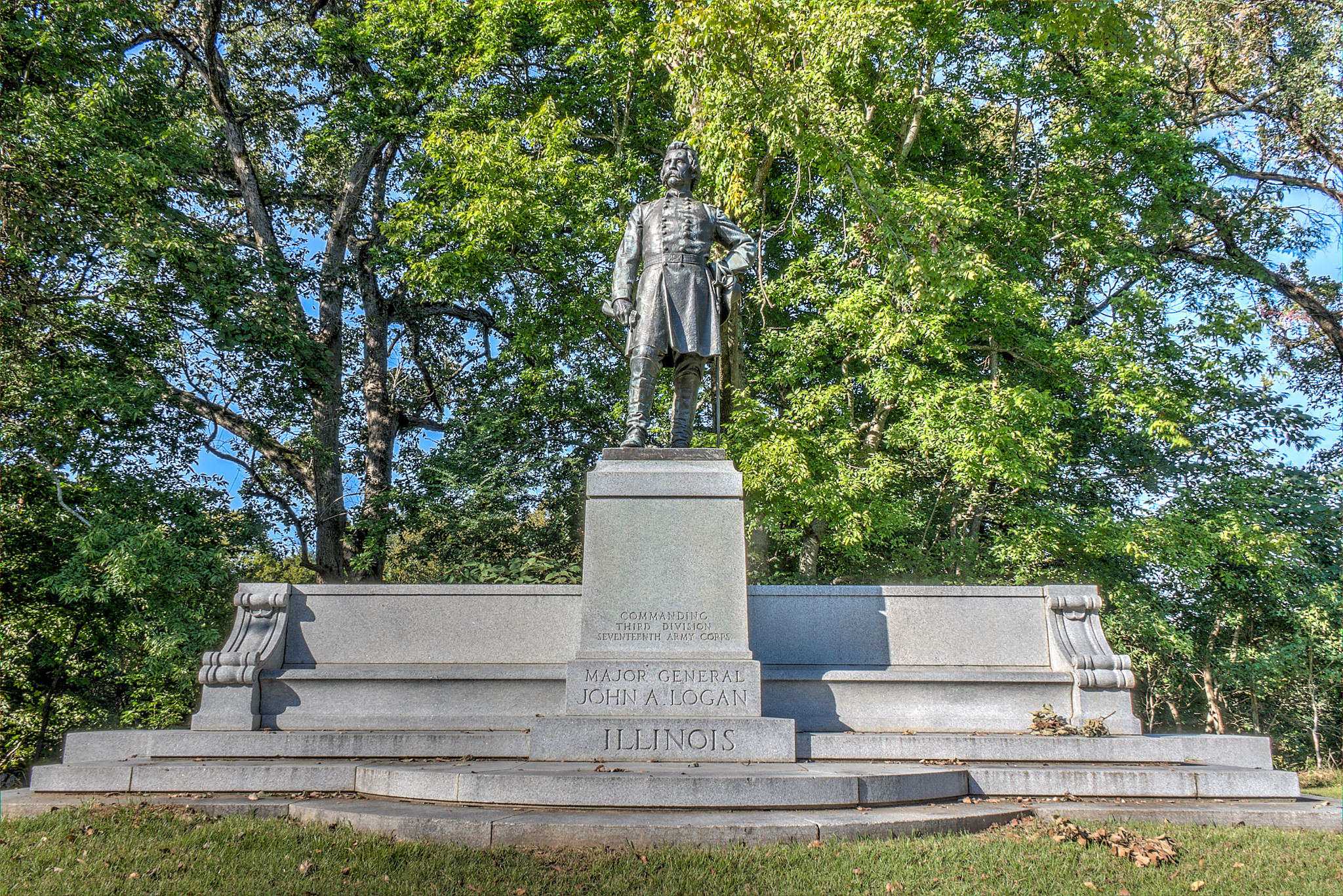
Maj. Gen. John A. Logan (1917) at Vicksburg National Military Park

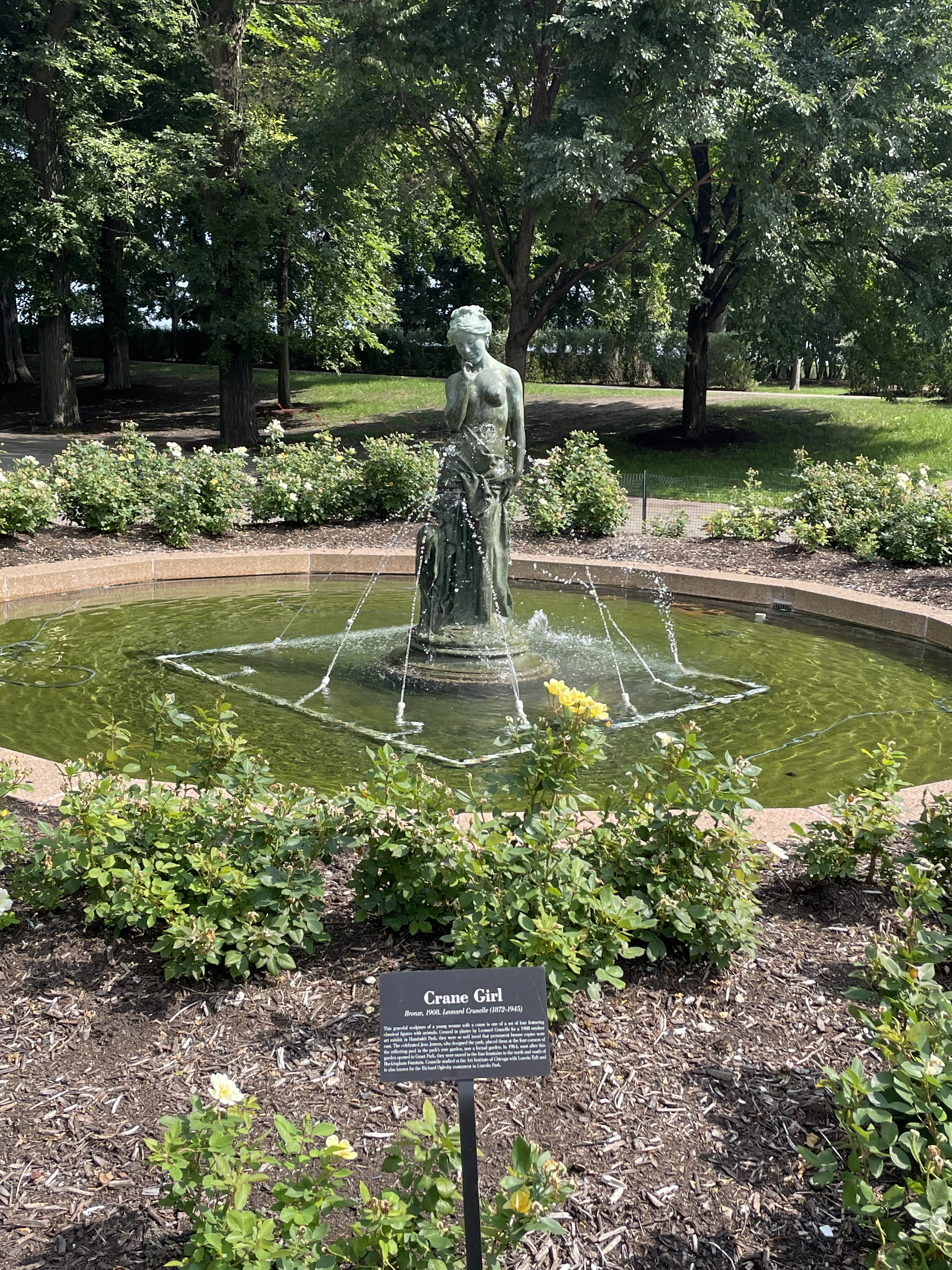
Crane Girl, NE corner of Buckingham Fountain, Chicago (Aug 2026)

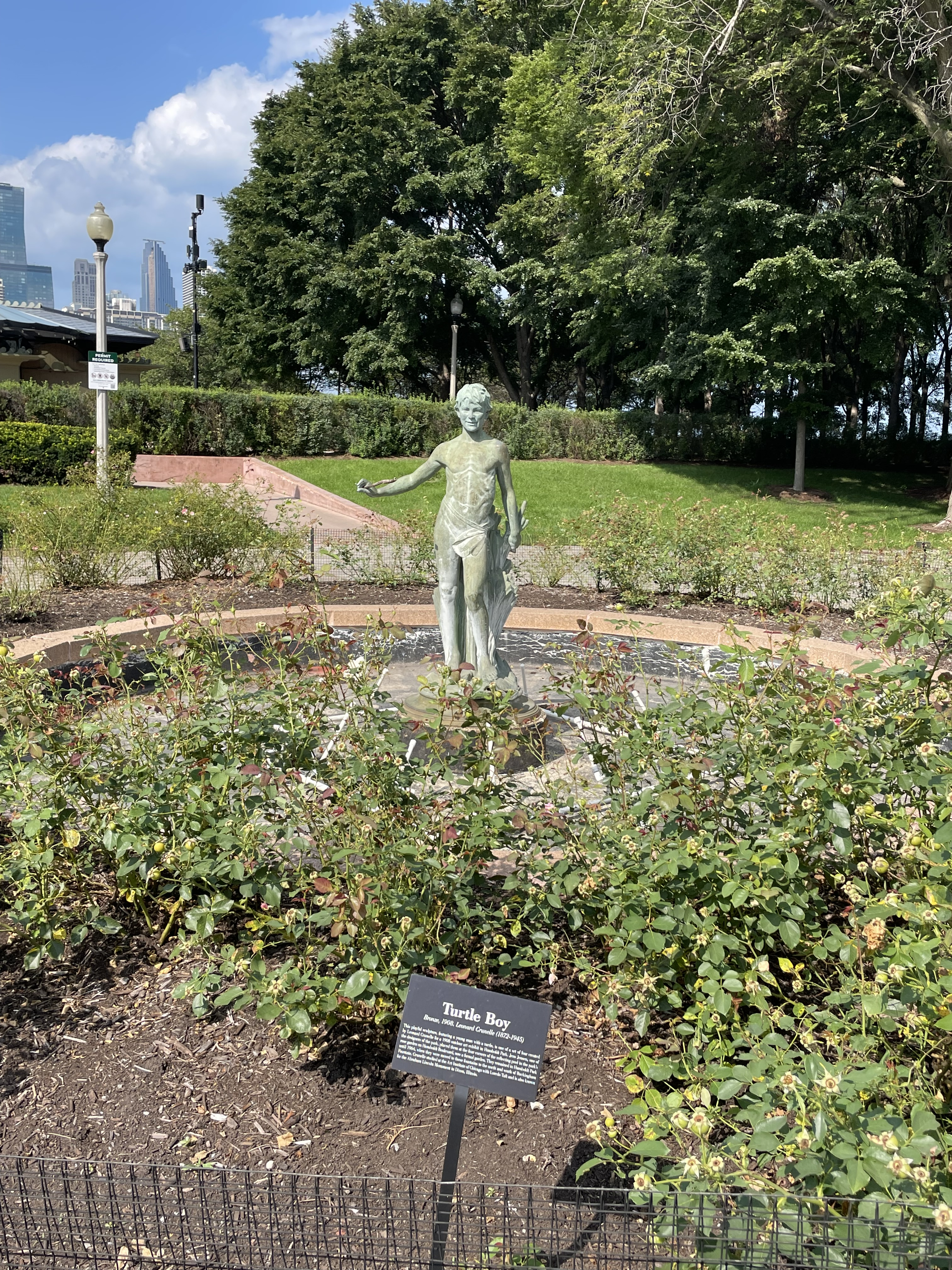
Turtle Boy, SE corner of Buckingham Fountain, Chicago (Aug 2026)

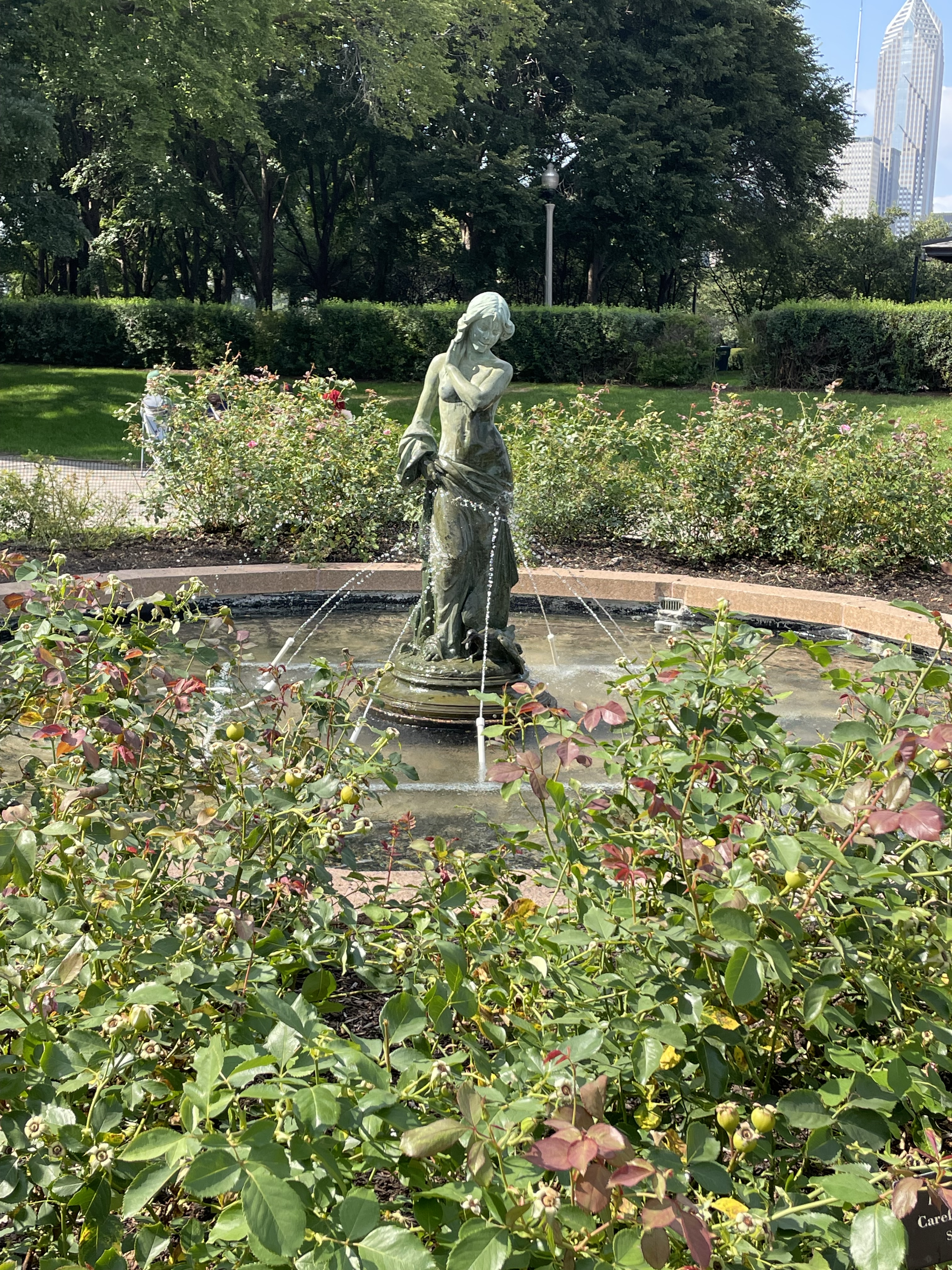
Dove Girl, SW corner of Buckingham Fountain, Chicago (Aug 2026)

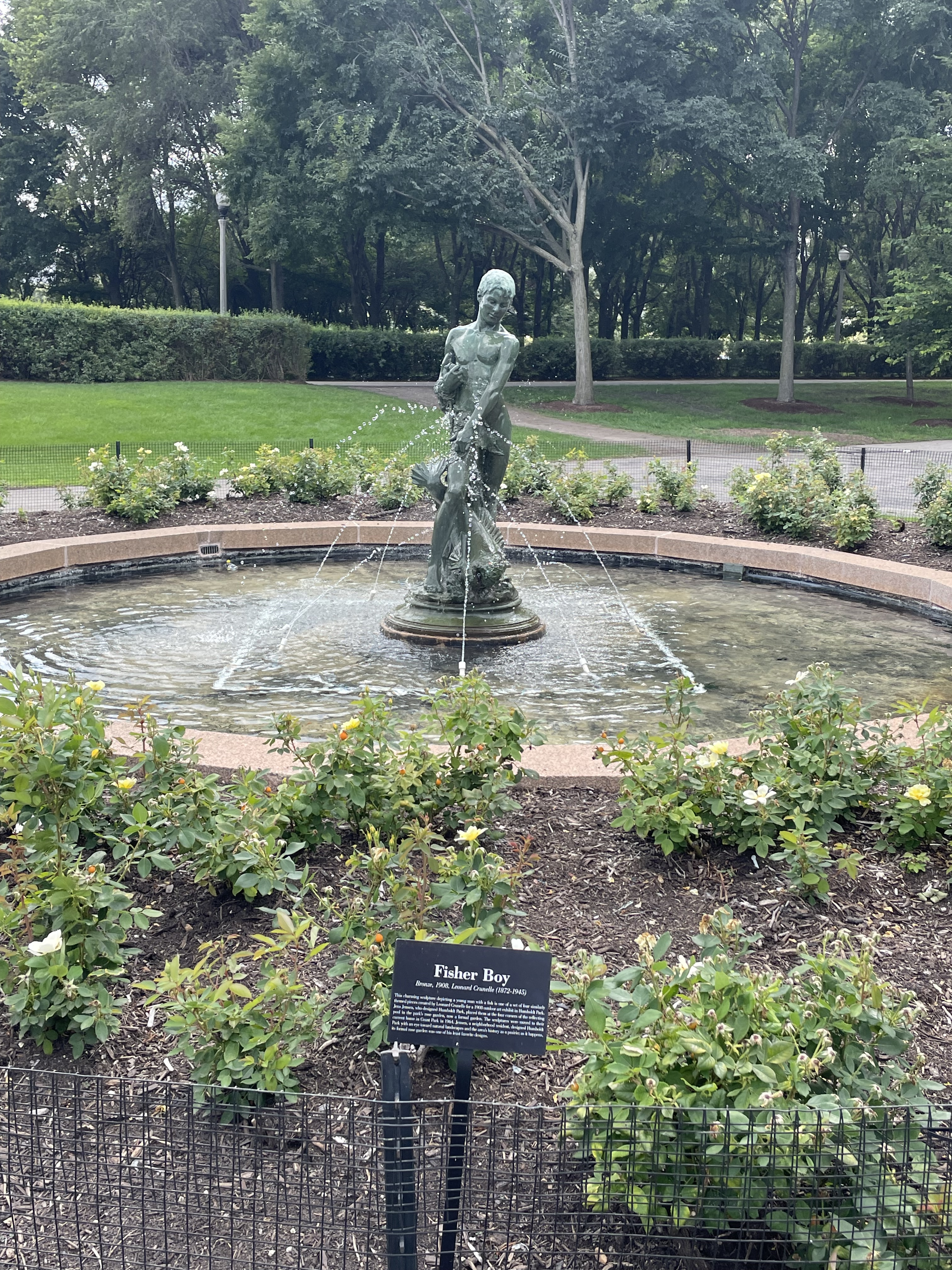
Fisher Boy, NW corner of Buckingham Fountain, Chicago (Aug 2026)
