= Nathan Heald =

American military officer (1775–1832)

Nathan Heald (New Ipswich, New Hampshire September 24, 1775 – O'Fallon, Missouri April 27, 1832) was an officer in the U.S. Army, during the War of 1812. He was in command of Fort Dearborn in Chicago during the Battle of Fort Dearborn.

Heald was a captain stationed in Fort Wayne, Indiana, prior to his appointment at Fort Dearborn, where he relieved the fort's first commander, John Whistler, in 1810. The following year, Heald traveled back to Fort Wayne to marry Rebecca Wells, and returned to the fort with his bride.

On August 9, 1812, Heald received orders from General William Hull to evacuate the troops from Fort Dearborn, leaving behind all the supplies at the fort. This meant that the Potawatomi would take the supplies and sell them to the British. Heald decided, therefore, not to leave the fort. On August 15, a group of Miami Indians led by his wife's father, Captain William Wells, arrived from Fort Wayne to provide assistance. A band of Potawatomi attacked the column, killing many civilians and soldiers. The ones they did not kill were held for ransom and sold to the British, who then set them free. Heald and his wife were both wounded, Heald being shot through the hips.

The Healds made their way across Lake Michigan and eventually arrived at Fort Detroit, then in British hands, where they surrendered. The British transported them to Buffalo, New York, where they were ransomed back to the Americans. Heald was promoted to major shortly after his release, and was given a disability discharge in 1814. His wife and he returned to Fort Wayne.

In 1817, Heald moved to O'Fallon, Missouri, and purchased the former Fort Zumwalt. His wife and he had three children, Mary, Darius, and Margaret.

Heald Square in Chicago is named after Heald.
