= Belleau Creek =

Stream in St. Charles County, Missouri, U.S.

Coordinates: 38.8236622°N 90.5784547°W

Belleau Creek is a stream in St. Charles County in the U.S. state of Missouri.

Belleau Creek derives its name from John Batiste Belland, an early settler.

== See also ==
- List of rivers of Missouri
