= Statue of Richard J. Oglesby =

Monumental statue in Chicago, Illinois, US

Richard J. Oglesby statue
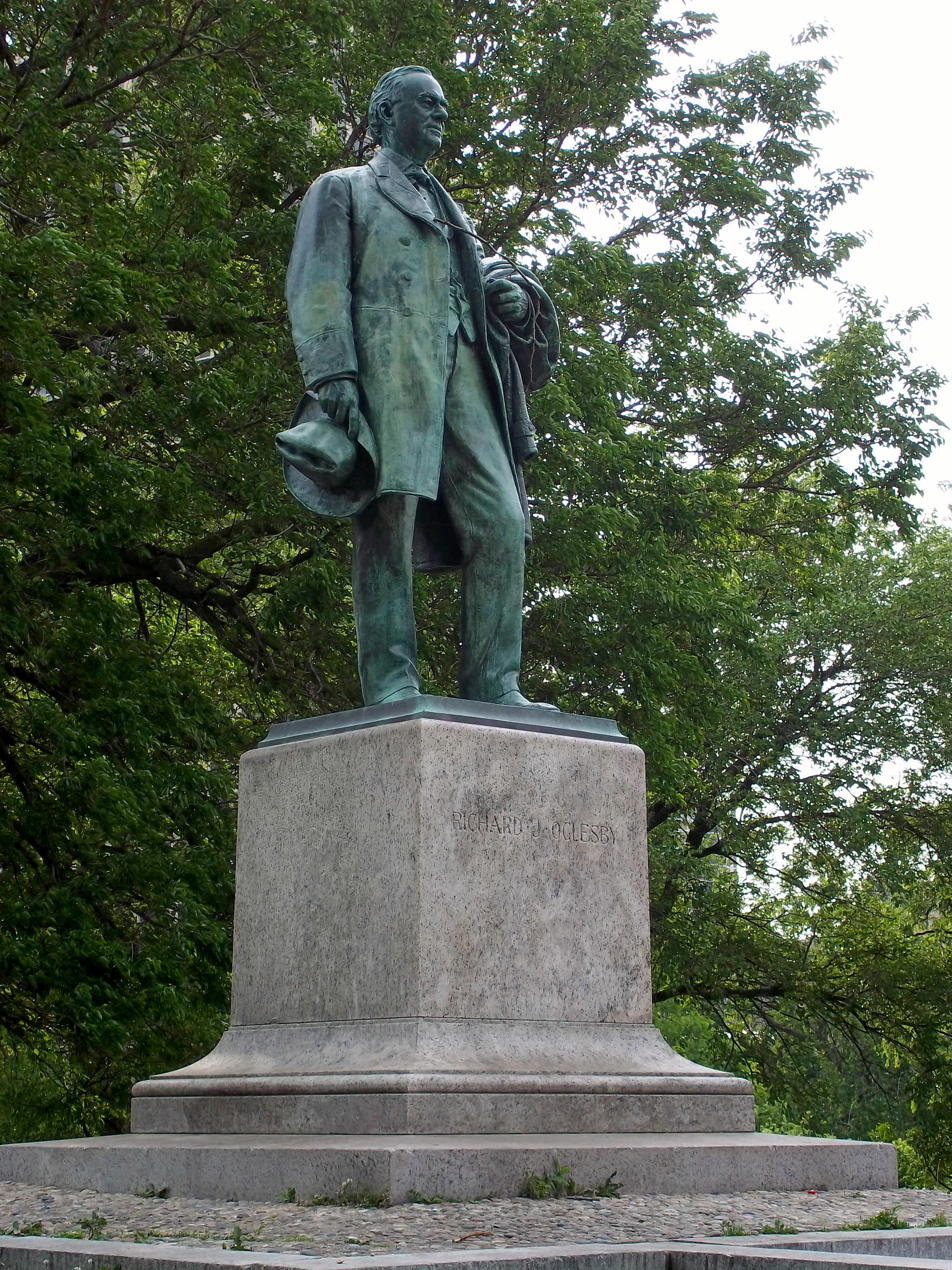
- Richard J. Oglesby statue (2011)
- Interactive map of Richard J. Oglesby statue
- Location: Lincoln Park, Chicago, Illinois, United States
- Coordinates: 41°55′48.58″N 87°38′13.45″W
- Designer: Leonard Crunelle
- Material: Bronze; Granite (pedestal)
- Dedicated date: 1919
- Dedicated to: Richard J. Oglesby

The Richard J. Oglesby statue is a monumental statue of Governor Richard J. Oglesby in Chicago, Illinois, United States. Dedicated in 1919, the statue was designed by Leonard Crunelle and located in the city's Lincoln Park.

== History ==
Richard J. Oglesby was an American politician and military commander who served in the Union Army during the American Civil War and served multiple terms as Governor of Illinois, and then as a U.S. Senator in the late 1800s. He died in 1899. By December 1916, sculptor Leonard Crunelle was chosen to design a monument honoring him at a cost of $25,000, approved by the Illinois General Assembly. The monument, featuring a bronze sculpture of Oglesby atop a granite pedestal, was dedicated in 1919 in Lincoln Park. Over the next several decades, the statue was subjected to extensive vandalism, including from spray paint graffiti, and c. 1990, the granite base was coated in urethane, ostensibly for preservation, but having the unintended consequence of changing the pedestal's cover and making it more susceptible to water damage. In November 1991, the statue was highlighted in an article of the Chicago Tribune that discussed the neglected state of public art in Chicago and interviewed Andrzej Dajnowski, the first sculpture conservator for the Chicago Park District, who talked about repairs that would happen to the sculpture.

== See also ==
- 1919 in art
