= Prairie Township, Franklin County, Missouri =

Township in Franklin County, Missouri, U.S.

Coordinates: 38.25°N 90.86°W

Prairie Township is an inactive township in Franklin County, in the U.S. state of Missouri.

== Geography ==
Prairie Township consists of hilly prairie land and lower river valleys near the Meramec River and Indian Creek streams. There is only one conservation area in Prairie Township, which is Little Indian Creek Conservation Area in both Franklin and Washington Counties.

=== Major Highways ===
- MO-47
- MO-30

=== Adjacent Townships ===
- Big River Township
- Calvey Township
- Central Township
- Johnson Township
- Meramec Township(Franklin County)
- Meramec Township(Jefferson County)
- Richwoods Township

== Communities ==
=== Unincorporated Communities ===
- Hemker(1885-1970)
- Huff
- Lonedell
- Luebbering
- Maupin

== History ==
Prairie Township was established in 1853, taking its name from the prairie land within its borders.
