= St. Johns Township, Franklin County, Missouri =

Township in Franklin County, Missouri, U.S.

Coordinates: 38.5353°N 91.0489°W

St. Johns Township is an inactive township in Franklin County, in the U.S. state of Missouri. This township contains the communities of Fourmile Corner, and parts of Clover Bottom. St. Johns Township takes its name from Saint Johns Creek.

== Geography ==
=== Major highways ===
- Route 100
- Route 47

=== Adjacent townships ===
- Boeuf Township
- Boles Township
- Boone Township
- Charrette Township
- Lyon Township
- Union Township
- Washington Township
