= Boles Township, Franklin County, Missouri =

Township in Franklin County, Missouri, U.S.

Coordinates: 38.5042°N 90.8203°W

Boles Township is an inactive township in Franklin County, in the U.S. state of Missouri.

== Geography ==
=== Major highways ===
- I-44
  - I-44 BUS (Pacific)
- US-50
- US-66 (1926-1985)
- MO-100

=== Adjacent Townships ===
- Calvey Township
- Central Township
- Chesterfield Township
- Boone Township
- St.Johns Township
- Union Township

== Communities ==
=== Cities ===
- Pacific

=== CDPs ===
- Villa Ridge
- Gray Summit

=== Unincorporated communities ===
- Boles,
- Oetters
- St.Albans

== History ==
Boles Township was established in 1821, taking its name from Ambrose Boles, a pioneer citizen.
