= Meramec Township, Franklin County, Missouri =

Inactive township in the US state of Missouri

Coordinates: 38.2678°N 91.1083°W

Meramec Township is an inactive township in Franklin County, in the U.S. state of Missouri.

This Township contains the communities of Sullivan, Miramiguoa Park, Monday, Stanton, Charmwood, and Oak Grove Village

Meramec Township was established in 1819, taking its name from the Meramec River.
