= Dubois Creek =

Stream in the American state of Missouri

Dubois Creek is a stream in Franklin County in the U.S. state of Missouri. It is a tributary to the Missouri River.

The headwaters arise at 38°28′51″N 91°02′30″W and the confluence with the Missouri is at 38°32′23″N 90°57′21″W. The stream source area is along the east side of Missouri Route A between Union and Krakow. The stream flows northeast passing under Route 47 and then north passing under Route 100 to enter the Missouri floodplain just east of Washington.

Dubois Creek most likely was named after Louis Dubois, an early French frontiersman.

== See also ==
- List of rivers of Missouri
