= Calvey =

Calvey may refer to:

== Places ==
- Calvey Creek, stream in Missouri
- Calvey, Missouri, ghost town in Missouri
- Calvey Township, Franklin County, Missouri, township in Missouri

== Surname ==
- John Calvey (1875–1937), English footballer
- Kevin Calvey (born 1966), American attorney and politician
- Linda Calvey (born 1948), English murderer
- Michael Calvey (born 1967), American businessman
