= Union Township, Franklin County, Missouri =

Inactive township in Franklin County, Missouri

Coordinates: 38.43°N 91.08°W

Union Township is an inactive township in Franklin County, in the U.S. state of Missouri.

Union Township was established in 1866, taking its name from the community of Union, Missouri.

This township contains the communities of Union, Neier, Beaufort, and Villa Ridge.
