= Voss Creek =

Stream in the American state of Missouri

Voss Creek is a stream in Franklin County in the U.S. state of Missouri. It is a tributary of the Bourbeuse River.

The headwaters rise just east of Missouri Route EE (at 38°23′07″N 91°07′39″W) and it flows to the east-southeast passing south of the community of Neier to its confluence with the Bourbeuse about 3 miles (5 km) east of its source (at 38°22′43″N 91°04′26″W). The confluence with the Bourbeuse is about 5 miles (8 km) southwest of Union and 5 miles (8 km) west-northwest of St. Clair.

Voss Creek most likely was named after Dietrich Voss, the proprietor of a local mill.

== See also ==
- List of rivers of Missouri
