= Lyon Township, Franklin County, Missouri =

Township in Franklin County, Missouri, U.S.

Coordinates: 38.4989°N 91.2447°W

Lyon Township is an inactive township in Franklin County, in the U.S. state of Missouri.

This township contains the communities of Beemont, Detmold, Lyon, Campbellton, Port Hudson, Jaeger's Shop, and parts of Beaufort

Lyon Township was established in 1866, taking its name from Nathaniel Lyon, an officer in the Civil War.
