= Mount Hope, Missouri =

Unincorporated community in Missouri, U.S.

Coordinates: 38°17′54″N 90°52′25″W

Mount Hope (also spelled (Mounthope) is an unincorporated community in southeastern Franklin County, in the U.S. state of Missouri.

The community is located on Missouri Route 47 approximately six miles southeast of Saint Clair and the community of Lonedell is 2.5 miles to the east-northeast.

== History ==
A post office called Mounthope was established in 1903, and remained in operation until 1909. The community was named after a nearby mine of the same name.
