= Calvey, Missouri =

Extinct town in Missouri, United States

Coordinates: 38.3475526°N 90.7962437°W

Calvey (also spelled Calvy) is an extinct town in Franklin County, in the U.S. state of Missouri.

A post office Calvy was established in 1854, and remained in operation until 1908. The community most likely took its name from Calvey Township.
