= Maupin Creek =

Stream in the American state of Missouri

Maupin Creek is a stream in Franklin and Jefferson Counties in the U.S. state of Missouri. It is a tributary of Big River.

The stream headwaters arise in Franklin County at 38°14′22″N 90°48′43″W and it flows east past the community of Maupin to its confluence with Big River in Jefferson County at 38°14′15″N 90°44′23″W.

Some say Maupin Creek was named after Mosias Maupin, a pioneer settler, while others believe the creek has the name of William Maupin.

== See also ==
- List of rivers of Missouri
