= Fiddle Creek =

Stream in the American state of Missouri

Fiddle Creek is a stream in northeast Franklin County in east central Missouri.

The stream headwaters are located adjacent to Missouri Route 100 approximately one mile northeast of Gray Summit at 38°30′19″N 90°48′21″W and the confluence with the Missouri River is at 38°35′58″N 90°45′45″W. The stream enters the Missouri River floodplain after crossing under Missouri Route T at Oetters and then runs along the south margin of the floodplain past St Albans to enter the Missouri River approximately 1.5 miles northeast of St Albans.

Fiddle Creek got its name because fiddling was a popular pastime among early settlers near the creek.

== See also ==
- List of rivers of Missouri
