= Noser Mill, Missouri =

Unincorporated community in Missouri, U.S.

Coordinates: 38°23′35″N 91°11′33″W

Noser Mill is an unincorporated community in Franklin County, Missouri, United States. The community is located on the Bourbeuse River, adjacent to Route 185 south of Beaufort.

== History ==
The community was named after John J. Noser, the proprietor of a local gristmill. An early variant name was "Luther". A post office called Luther was established in 1872, the name was changed to Noser Mill in 1902, and the post office closed in 1908.
