= Saint Johns Creek (Missouri) =

Stream in the American state of Missouri

Saint Johns Creek is a stream in Franklin County in the U.S. state of Missouri. It is a tributary of the Missouri River.

The stream headwaters arise northwest of Leslie and Missouri Route 50 at 38°25′51″N 91°16′10″W and the stream meanders to the northeast crossing under Missouri Route 185 north of Beaufort. It continues to the northeast passing under Missouri Route 100 and on to its confluence with the Missouri just northwest of Washington at 38°34′08″N 91°01′17″W.

Saint Johns Creek most likely derives its name from an English translation of Fort San Juan del Misuri, a Spanish fort along its course.

== See also ==
- List of rivers of Missouri
