= Port Hudson =

Port Hudson may refer to:

- Port Hudson, Louisiana, an unincorporated community and scene of the 1863 Siege of Port Hudson
- Port Hudson, Missouri, an unincorporated community
