= Berger, Missouri =

- City
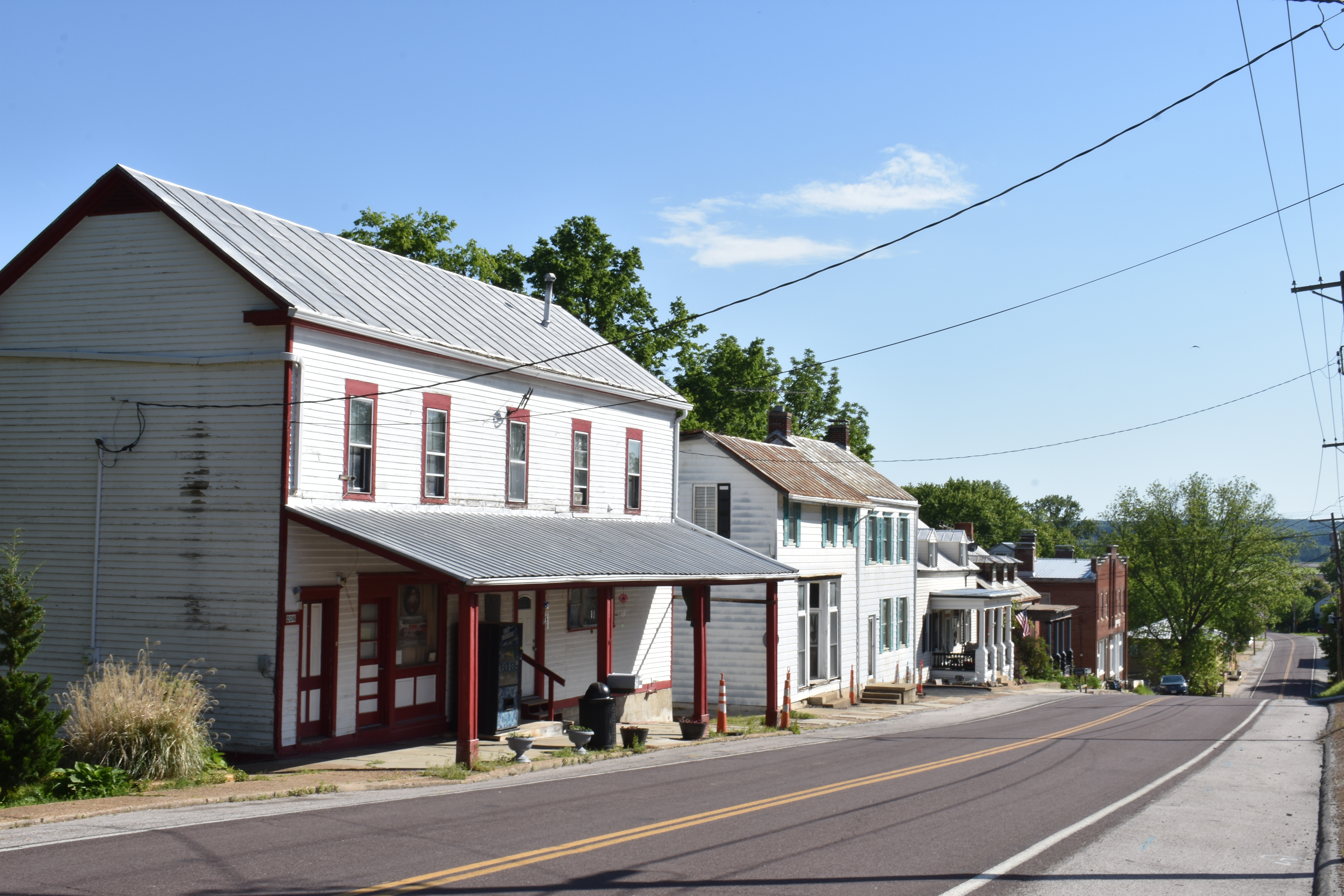
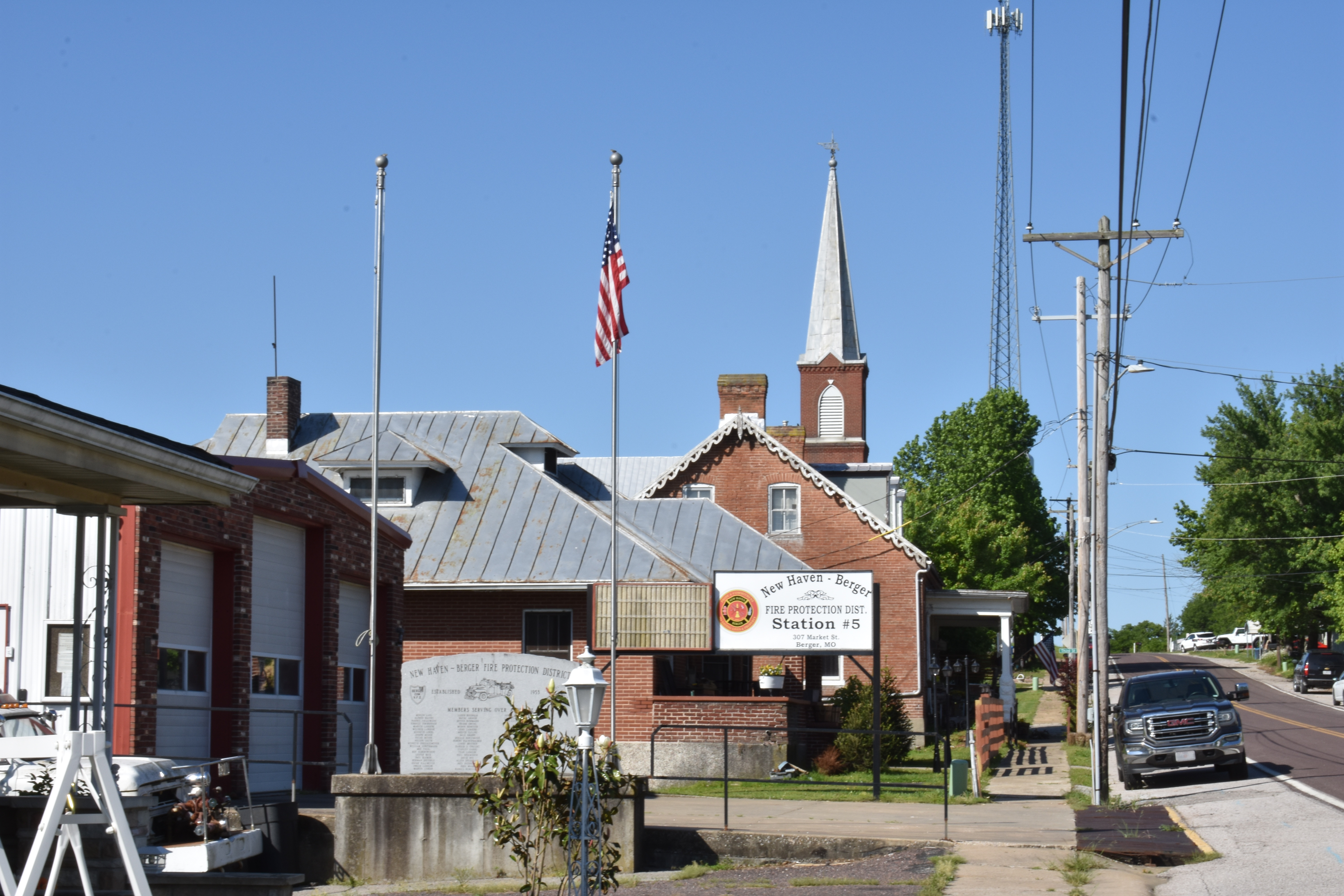
- Berger looking east on Market Street Berger looking west on Market Street

- Location of Berger, Missouri
- Coordinates: 38°40′30″N 91°20′15″W
- Country: United States
- State: Missouri
- County: Franklin

Area
  - Total: 0.31 sq mi (0.81 km^{2})
  - Land: 0.31 sq mi (0.81 km^{2})
  - Water: 0 sq mi (0.00 km^{2})
- Elevation: 518 ft (158 m)

Population (2020)
  - Total: 256
  - Density: 815.9/sq mi (315.01/km^{2})
- Time zone: UTC-6 (Central (CST))
  - Summer (DST): UTC-5 (CDT)
- ZIP code: 63014
- Area code: 573
- FIPS code: 29-04888
- GNIS feature ID: 2394144

Berger (/ˈbɜːrdʒər/ BUR-jər) is a city in northwest Franklin County, Missouri, United States, located south of the Missouri River. The population was 256 at the 2020 census.

== History ==
A post office called Berger has been in operation since 1856. The town site was not platted until 1870. The community has the name of Casper Berger, an early settler.

Berger has some history as a place where mules were raised for the 2nd world war. An extensive mule farm is said to have been there, and supplied much of the needed beasts of burden for the war effort.

== Geography ==
According to the United States Census Bureau, the city has a total area of 0.31 square miles (0.80 km^{2}), all land.

The rural town is located on the Berger Bottom, a floodplain south of the Missouri River.

== Demographics ==
Historical population
Census	Pop.	Note	%±
1880	134		—
1930	231		—
1940	213		−7.8%
1950	210		−1.4%
1960	187		−11.0%
1970	226		20.9%
1980	214		−5.3%
1990	247		15.4%
2000	206		−16.6%
2010	221		7.3%
2020	256		15.8%
U.S. Decennial Census

=== 2010 census ===
As of the census of 2010, there were 221 people, 85 households, and 49 families living in the city. The population density was 712.9 inhabitants per square mile (275.3/km^{2}). There were 97 housing units at an average density of 312.9 per square mile (120.8/km^{2}). The racial makeup of the city was 99.5% White and 0.5% African American.

There were 85 households, of which 38.8% had children under the age of 18 living with them, 44.7% were married couples living together, 7.1% had a female householder with no husband present, 5.9% had a male householder with no wife present, and 42.4% were non-families. 34.1% of all households were made up of individuals, and 20% had someone living alone who was 65 years of age or older. The average household size was 2.60 and the average family size was 3.45.

The median age in the city was 34.3 years. 28.5% of residents were under the age of 18; 8.9% were between the ages of 18 and 24; 23.5% were from 25 to 44; 25.3% were from 45 to 64; and 13.6% were 65 years of age or older. The gender makeup of the city was 50.2% male and 49.8% female.

=== 2000 census ===
As of the census of 2000, there were 206 people, 85 households, and 56 families living in the city. The population density was 686.7 inhabitants per square mile (265.1/km^{2}). There were 100 housing units at an average density of 333.4 per square mile (128.7/km^{2}). The racial makeup of the city was 97.57% White, 0.49% African American, 0.49% Asian, and 1.46% from two or more races.

There were 85 households, out of which 25.9% had children under the age of 18 living with them, 55.3% were married couples living together, 9.4% had a female householder with no husband present, and 34.1% were non-families. 31.8% of all households were made up of individuals, and 18.8% had someone living alone who was 65 years of age or older. The average household size was 2.42 and the average family size was 3.09.

In the city the population was spread out, with 25.7% under the age of 18, 7.3% from 18 to 24, 24.8% from 25 to 44, 23.3% from 45 to 64, and 18.9% who were 65 years of age or older. The median age was 41 years. For every 100 females, there were 96.2 males. For every 100 females age 18 and over, there were 91.3 males.

The median income for a household in the city was $32,083, and the median income for a family was $42,188. Males had a median income of $31,406 versus $21,667 for females. The per capita income for the city was $18,460. About 3.5% of families and 5.8% of the population were below the [[poverty line]], including none of those under the age of eighteen and 17.4% of those 65 or over.
