= Missouri Route 30 =

State highway in Missouri, U.S.

Route 30
- Route 30 highlighted in red

Route information
- Maintained by MoDOT
- Length: 52.718 mi (84.841 km)
- Existed: 1922–present

Major junctions
- West end: I-44 / Route WW in St. Clair
- Route 47 in St. Clair; Route 141 in Fenton; I-270 in Sunset Hills; US 50 / US 61 / US 67 in Sunset Hills
- East end: I-44 / I-55 in St. Louis

Location
- Country: United States
- State: Missouri
- Counties: Franklin; Jefferson; St. Louis
- Independent city: City of St. Louis

Highway system
- Missouri State Highway System; Interstate; US; State; Supplemental
← I-29	→ Route 31

Route 30 is a highway in eastern Missouri, United States. Its eastern terminus is at the Interstate 55/Interstate 44 junction in St. Louis. Its western terminus is at Interstate 44 in St. Clair. In St. Louis, the section between Interstate 44 and Route 366 is part of historic U.S. Route 66 and is marked as such. In the St. Louis area, it is known as Gravois Avenue or Gravois Road. Further south, Gravois Rd. is used to mark the old section of the highway where the newer, divided highway rerouted Highway 30.

== Route description ==
Route 30 begins as it crosses over Interstate 55 at I-55's interchange with I-44. The four-lane road turns southwest as Gravois Road and, after about two miles (3.2 km), intersects Route 366. Shortly after the intersection with Route 366, the road becomes a narrow street passing through some older parts of St. Louis. At the city limits of St. Louis, it continues into the suburban area (unincorporated). Shortly before reaching Grantwood Village is the northern terminus with Route 21. About two miles (3.2 km) further west is the intersection with Lindbergh Boulevard (U.S. 50 / U.S. 61 / U.S. 67) and the road becomes a four-lane divided highway. A mile past Lindbergh Boulevard is the junction with I-270, and two miles (3.2 km) southwest of that is an interchange over Route 141.

As the highway continues southwest in the suburban St. Louis area, the road has several traffic lights which gradually diminish as the road approaches Cedar Hill. West of Cedar Hill, the divided highway ends and the road becomes a winding road all the way to its end. A portion of the highway over the Meramec River was re-routed in the early 2000s when a new, wider bridge was built.

West of Lonedell is the beginning of a concurrency with Route 47. The concurrency ends five miles (8.0 km) later inside the city limits of St. Clair. The road briefly joins former U.S. Route 66, turns a corner, and ends at Interstate 44.

=== Mass transit ===
The southern half of MetroBus Route #10 (Lindell-Gravois) follows Gravois Ave from the Civic Center Station at 14th and Spruce, then onto Tucker and Chouteau. From Tucker, the route follows nearly the entirety of Gravois Ave until it reaches the Hampton Loop at Hampton and Gravois.

== Major intersections ==
County	Location	mi	km	Destinations	Notes
Franklin	St. Clair	52.718– 52.63	84.841– 84.70	Route WW west / Historic US 66 west I-44 – Rolla, St. Louis	Western terminus of Route 30, eastern terminus of Route WW; west end of concurrency with Historic US 66; exit 239 on I-44; road continues as Route WW/Historic US 66 west
Franklin	St. Clair	52.265	84.112	Route 47 north / Historic US 66 east (Commercial Avenue)	East end of concurrency with Historic US 66; west end of concurrency with Route 47
Franklin	St. Clair	51.949	83.604	Route PP south (Sycamore Avenue)	Northern terminus of Route PP
Franklin	Parkway	50.901	81.917	Route K south / Parkway Drive	Northern terminus of Route K
Franklin	Prairie Township	46.061	74.128	Route 47 south – Richwoods	East end of concurrency with Route 47
Franklin	Lonedell	42.859	68.975	Route N north	Southern terminus of Route N
Franklin	Lonedell	42.798	68.877	Route FF south	Northern terminus of Route FF
Franklin	Prairie Township	40.213	64.717	Route HH north	Southern terminus of Route HH
Jefferson	Grubville	38.227	61.520	Route Y south	Northern terminus of Route Y
Jefferson	Meramec Township	31.905	51.346	Route NN north / Route B south – Hillsboro	Southern terminus of Route NN; northern terminus of Route B
Jefferson	Cedar Hill	30.882	49.700	Route BB south – Hillsboro	Northern terminus of Route BB
Jefferson	Byrnes Mill	25.259	40.650	Route W north / Route MM east – Eureka, House Springs	Southern terminus of Route W; northern terminus of Route MM
Jefferson	High Ridge	21.304	34.285	Route PP north	Southern terminus of Route PP
St. Louis	Fenton	14.592– 14.578	23.484– 23.461	Route 141 – Fenton, Valley Park	Interchange
St. Louis	Sunset Hills	11.885– 11.871	19.127– 19.105	I-270	Exit 3 on I-270
St. Louis	Sunset Hills	10.932	17.593	US 50 / US 61 / US 67 (Lindbergh Boulevard)	
St. Louis	Affton	7.82	12.59	Route 21 south (Tesson Ferry Road) / Rock Hill Road	Northern terminus of Route 21
St. Louis	Affton	7.5	12.1	Gravois Loop West	Interchange to frontage roads; eastbound exit and westbound entrance
St. Louis	Affton	7.487	12.049	Gravois Loop East	Interchange to frontage roads; westbound exit and eastbound entrance
St. Louis	Affton	7.284	11.722	Route P north (Mackenzie Road)	Southern terminus of Route P
City of St. Louis		3.027	4.871	Frontage roads	Interchange; eastbound exit and westbound entrance
City of St. Louis		2.915	4.691	Meramec Street	Partial interchange; intersection with westbound ramp to Meramec St. east; also provides access to Bingham Avenue east
City of St. Louis		2.742	4.413	Route 366 / Historic US 66 west (Chippewa Street)	West end of concurrency with Historic US 66; no left turns
City of St. Louis		2.06	3.32	Grand Boulevard	
City of St. Louis		1.801	2.898	Cherokee Street	
City of St. Louis		0.633	1.019	Jefferson Avenue / Sidney Street	No left turns
City of St. Louis		0.000	0.000	I-55 south – Memphis	Eastern terminus; exit 207A on I-55
City of St. Louis				I-44 east / I-55 north Tucker Boulevard (Historic US 66 east)	MoDOT signs this as eastern terminus; exit 290A on I-44 west; east end of concurrency with Historic US 66; road continues north as Tucker Blvd. (Historic US 66 east)
1.000 mi = 1.609 km; 1.000 km = 0.621 mi: Concurrency terminus; Incomplete access; Route transition
