= Neier, Missouri =

Unincorporated community in Missouri, U.S.

Coordinates: 38°23′28″N 91°06′38″W

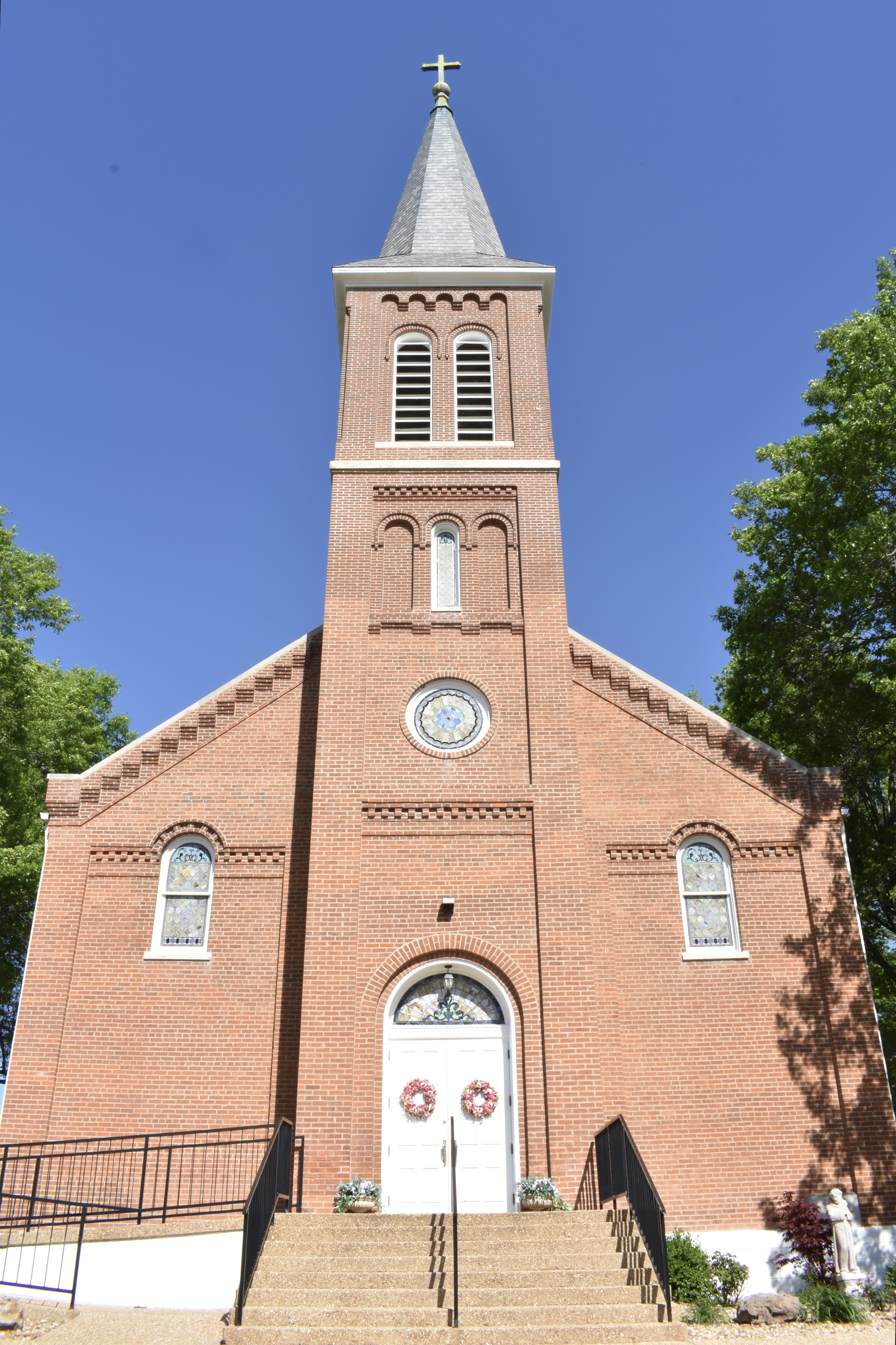
St. Joseph's Catholic Church, located in Neier, Missouri, built in 1868

Neier is an unincorporated community in Franklin County, in the U.S. state of Missouri. The community is located southwest of Union between routes EE and UU. It lies north of Voss Creek and west of Bourbeuse River.

== History ==
A post office called Neier was established in 1884, and remained in operation until 1909. Peter Neier, an early postmaster, most likely gave the community his last name.
