= Gildehouse, Missouri =

Unincorporated community in Missouri, U.S.

Coordinates: 38°29′05″N 90°56′19″W

Gildehaus is an unincorporated community in Franklin County, in the U.S. state of Missouri. There is a church and a school located there called St.Johns the Baptist Gildehaus.

== History ==
A post office called Gildehaus was established in 1894, and remained in operation until 1906. The community has the name of Henry Gildehaus.
