= Luebbering, Missouri =

Unincorporated community in Missouri, U.S.

Coordinates: 38°16′13″N 90°49′09″W

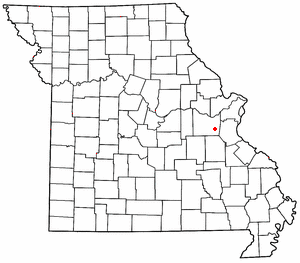

Luebbering is an unincorporated community in eastern Franklin County, Missouri, United States. It is located on Missouri Route FF, approximately ten miles southeast of St. Clair and about 2.5 miles south of Lonedell.

A post office called Lueberring was established in 1888, and remained in operation until 1996. John Frederick Luebbering, an early postmaster, gave the community his last name.
