= Parkway, Missouri =

Parkway
- Village
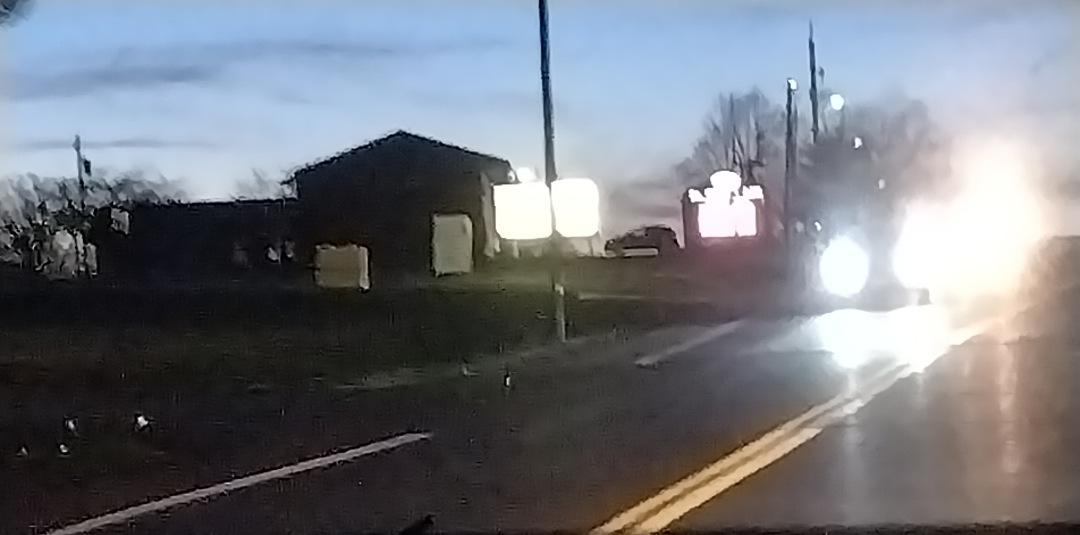
- Parkway in 2024

- Location of Parkway, Missouri
- Coordinates: 38°20′10″N 90°58′16″W
- Country: United States
- State: Missouri
- County: Franklin

Area
  - Total: 0.37 sq mi (0.95 km^{2})
  - Land: 0.37 sq mi (0.95 km^{2})
  - Water: 0 sq mi (0.00 km^{2})
- Elevation: 699 ft (213 m)

Population (2020)
  - Total: 663
  - Density: 1,812.1/sq mi (699.65/km^{2})
- Time zone: UTC-6 (Central (CST))
  - Summer (DST): UTC-5 (CDT)
- ZIP code: 63077
- Area code: 636
- FIPS code: 29-56306
- GNIS feature ID: 2399625
- Website: www.villageofparkway.com

Parkway is a village in Franklin County, Missouri, United States. As of the 2020 census, Parkway had a population of 663.

== Geography ==
Parkway is located just southeast of Saint Clair on Missouri Routes 30 and 47, approximately 1.25 miles east of Interstate 44. The Meramec River flows past, about two miles to the east.

According to the United States Census Bureau, the village has a total area of 0.27 square miles (0.70 km^{2}), all land.

== Demographics ==
Historical population
| Census | Pop. | Note | %± |
|---|---|---|---|
| 1960 | 222 | | — |
| 1970 | 233 | | 5.0% |
| 1980 | 254 | | 9.0% |
| 1990 | 277 | | 9.1% |
| 2000 | 280 | | 1.1% |
| 2010 | 439 | | 56.8% |
| 2020 | 663 | | 51.0% |
U.S. Decennial Census

=== 2010 census ===
As of the census of 2010, there were 439 people, 193 households, and 110 families living in the village. The population density was 1,625.9 inhabitants per square mile (627.8/km^{2}). There were 217 housing units at an average density of 803.7 per square mile (310.3/km^{2}). The racial makeup of the village was 95.9% White, 2.1% African American, 1.4% Asian, 0.5% from other races, and 0.2% from two or more races. Hispanic or Latino of any race were 0.7% of the population.

There were 193 households, of which 28.5% had children under the age of 18 living with them, 42.0% were married couples living together, 10.4% had a female householder with no husband present, 4.7% had a male householder with no wife present, and 43.0% were non-families. 36.8% of all households were made up of individuals, and 25.9% had someone living alone who was 65 years of age or older. The average household size was 2.27 and the average family size was 3.04.

The median age in the village was 39.1 years. 23.9% of residents were under the age of 18; 9.2% were between the ages of 18 and 24; 23.6% were from 25 to 44; 23.3% were from 45 to 64; and 20% were 65 years of age or older. The gender makeup of the village was 45.3% male and 54.7% female.

=== 2000 census ===
As of the census of 2000, there were 280 people, 111 households, and 83 families living in the village. The population density was 908.8 inhabitants per square mile (350.9/km^{2}). There were 127 housing units at an average density of 412.2 per square mile (159.2/km^{2}). The racial makeup of the village was 98.57% White, and 1.43% from two or more races. Hispanic or Latino of any race were 0.36% of the population.

There were 111 households, out of which 36.0% had children under the age of 18 living with them, 61.3% were married couples living together, 8.1% had a female householder with no husband present, and 25.2% were non-families. 20.7% of all households were made up of individuals, and 9.9% had someone living alone who was 65 years of age or older. The average household size was 2.52 and the average family size was 2.94.

In the village, the population was spread out, with 26.8% under the age of 18, 6.4% from 18 to 24, 26.8% from 25 to 44, 21.4% from 45 to 64, and 18.6% who were 65 years of age or older. The median age was 37 years. For every 100 females, there were 102.9 males. For every 100 females age 18 and over, there were 93.4 males.

The median income for a household in the village was $28,929, and the median income for a family was $35,357. Males had a median income of $31,172 versus $20,804 for females. The per capita income for the village was $16,535. About 2.2% of families and 4.0% of the population were below the poverty line, including 3.3% of those under the age of eighteen and none of those 65 or over.

== Education ==
It is in the St. Clair R-XIII School District.
