= Jaegers Shop, Missouri =

Unincorporated community in Missouri, U.S.

Coordinates: 38°27′40″N 91°17′58″W

Jaegers Shop is an unincorporated community in Franklin County, in the U.S. state of Missouri.

== History ==
Variant names were "Cedar Fork", Cedarfork", and "Jaeger". The name Cedar Fork was after nearby Cedar Fork creek, while Jaeger was the name of William F. Jaeger, a local blacksmith. A post office called Cedar Fork was established in 1858, and remained in operation until 1907.
