= Washington Township, Franklin County, Missouri =

Township in Franklin County, Missouri, U.S.

Coordinates: 38.545°N 91.000°W

Washington Township is an inactive township in Franklin County, in the U.S. state of Missouri.

Washington Township takes its name from the community of Washington, Missouri.

== Geography ==
=== Major highways ===
MO-47

MO-100
