= Jeffriesburg, Missouri =

Unincorporated community in the U.S. state of Missouri

Coordinates: 38°26′25″N 91°05′18″W

Jeffriesburg is an unincorporated community in Franklin County, in the U.S. state of Missouri.

== History ==
A post office called Jeffriesburgh was established in 1857, and remained in operation until 1942. Some say the community was named after Elisha Betts Jeffries, a local politician, while others believe the namesake was Achilles Whitehead Jeffries, a pioneer citizen.
