= Clover Bottom, Missouri =

Unincorporated community in Missouri, U.S.

Coordinates: 38°30′13″N 91°07′11″W

Clover Bottom is an unincorporated community in Franklin County, in the U.S. state of Missouri. The community is at the intersection of routes YY and AJ approximately 3.5 miles west of Krakow.

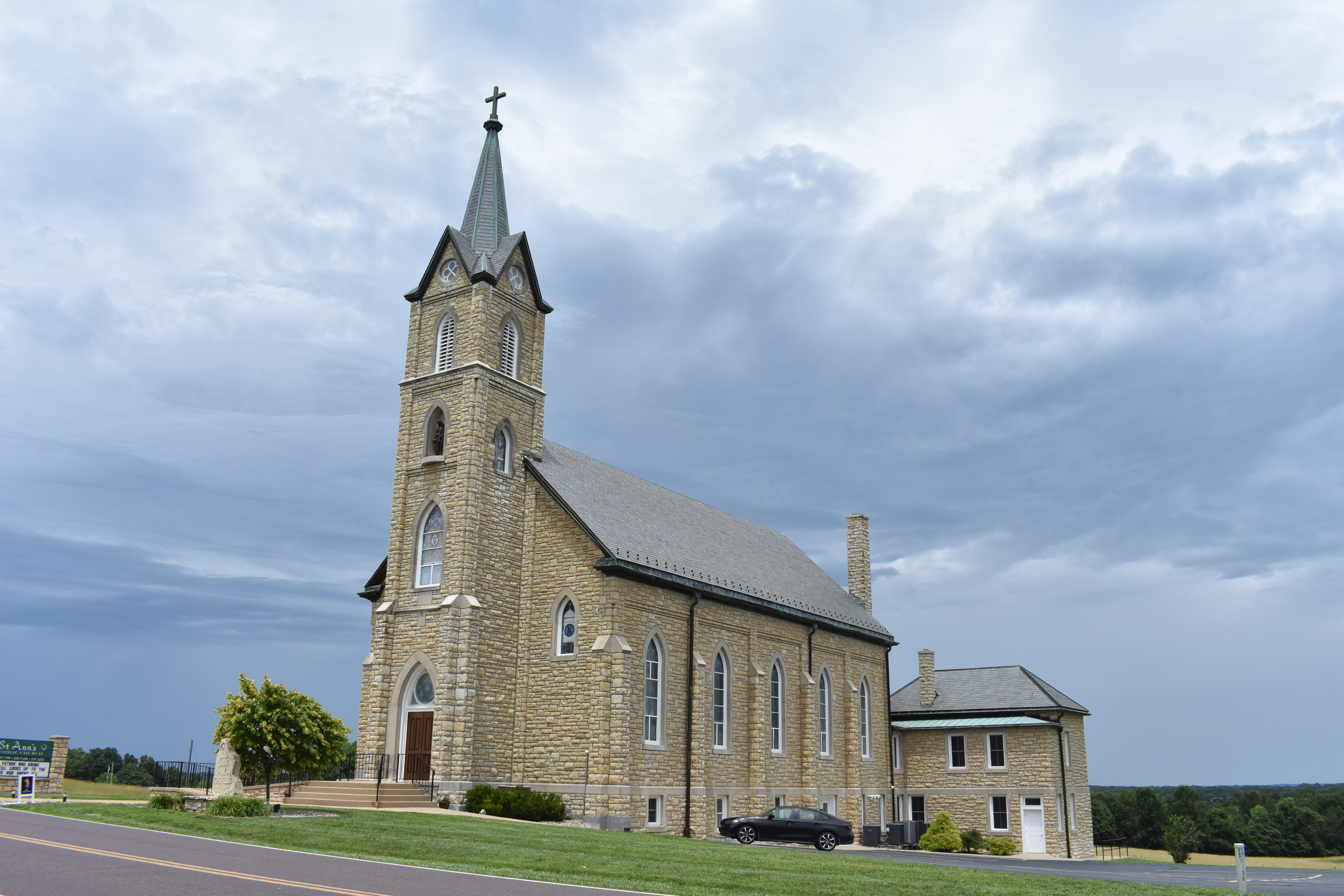
St Ann's Catholic Church

== History ==
A post office called Clover Bottom was established in 1869, and remained in operation until the 1920s. The community was descriptively named.
