= Calvey Creek =

Stream in the American state of Missouri

Calvey Creek is a stream in Franklin and Jefferson counties in the U.S. state of Missouri. It is a tributary to the Meramec River.

The stream headwaters are in Jefferson County at 38°17′39″N 90°45′10″W and the confluence with the Meramec in Franklin County is at 38°26′18″N 90°48′04″W. The source area for the stream lies south of Missouri Route 30 north of Grubville in Jefferson County and the stream flows north along the county line before turning northwest passing under Route HH. The stream forms the east boundary of Robertsville State Park west of Catawissa and meets the Meramec at the northeast corner of the park.

Calvey Creek has the name of the Calvey family, French pioneers to the region.

== See also ==
- List of rivers of Missouri
