= Charmwood, Missouri =

- Town
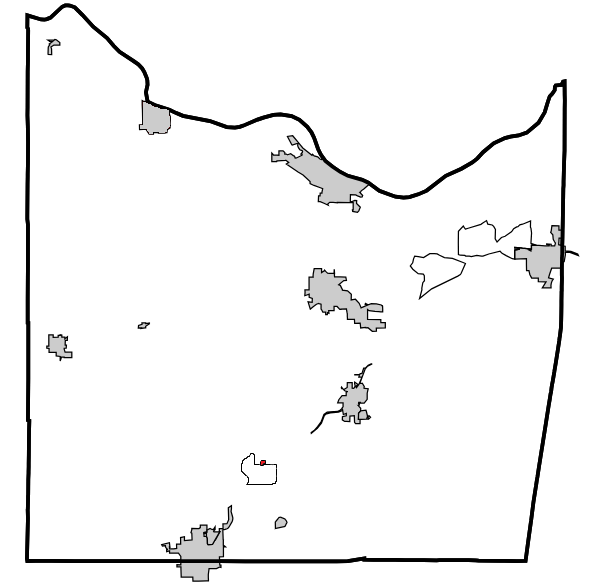

- Location of Charmwood in Missouri
- Coordinates: 38°16′46″N 91°05′55″W
- Country: United States
- State: Missouri
- County: Franklin
- Incorporated: February 23, 2011

Area
  - Total: 0.14 sq mi (0.36 km^{2})
  - Land: 0.14 sq mi (0.36 km^{2})
  - Water: 0 sq mi (0.00 km^{2})
- Elevation: 863 ft (263 m)

Population (2020)
  - Total: 17
  - Density: 121.1/sq mi (46.75/km^{2})
- Time zone: UTC-6 (Central (CST))
  - Summer (DST): UTC-5 (CDT)
- ZIP code: 63079
- Area code: 636
- FIPS code: 29-13390
- GNIS feature ID: 2748257

Charmwood is a town in Franklin County, Missouri, United States. As of the 2020 census, Charmwood had a population of 17. The town was incorporated as a result of issues with the Charmwood Subdivision's water and sewer systems. Incorporation allowed the new town to apply for grants from the USDA to upgrade these systems.

== Geography ==
Charmwood is located adjacent to Stanton.

According to the United States Census Bureau, the city has a total area of 0.14 square miles (0.36 km^{2}), all land.

== Demographics ==
Historical population
Census	Pop.	Note	%±
2020	17		—
U.S. Decennial Census

=== 2015 American Community Survey ===
As of the 2015 American Community Survey, the racial makeup of the city was:
100.0% White

== Education ==
It is in the Sullivan C-2 School District.
