= Union High School (Missouri) =

American high school in Missouri

Location
- 1 Wildcat Drive; Union, Franklin County, Missouri 63084; United States; 38.4478°N 91.0302°W

Information
- Type: Public comprehensive high school
- Motto: Inspiring Success
- Established: 1835; 191 years ago
- School district: Union R-XI School District
- NCES District ID: 2930570
- Superintendent: Mike Uchi
- CEEB code: 263425
- NCES School ID: 293057002101
- Principal: Josh Hall
- Staff: 74
- Faculty: 64.06 (on an FTE basis)
- Grades: 9–12
- Enrollment: 993 (2023–24)
- Student to teacher ratio: 15.50
- Campus type: Rural
- Colors: Red and black
- Song: Amici
- Athletics conference: Four Rivers Conference
- Sports: 15
- Mascot: Wildcats
- Yearbook: Amican
- Graduates (2012): 183
- Website: unionrxi.org

Union High School is a public high school in Union, Missouri that is part of the Union R-XI School District, which is MSIP-accredited and in 2001–02 and in 2009–10 was awarded Distinction in Performance by the Missouri Department of Elementary and Secondary Education.

== Student life ==
Students have the opportunity to participate in Future Farmers of America or FFA. The Union FFA Chapter was honored in 2002 as one of the top 10 FFA Chapters in the United States.
