= Meramec Caverns =

Cave system in Missouri, US

- Interactive map of Meramec Caverns
- Location: Stanton, Missouri
- Coordinates: 38°14′29″N 91°05′33″W
- Length: 4.6 miles (7.4 km)
- Discovery: Pre-Columbian; extended system in 1933
- Geology: Limestone

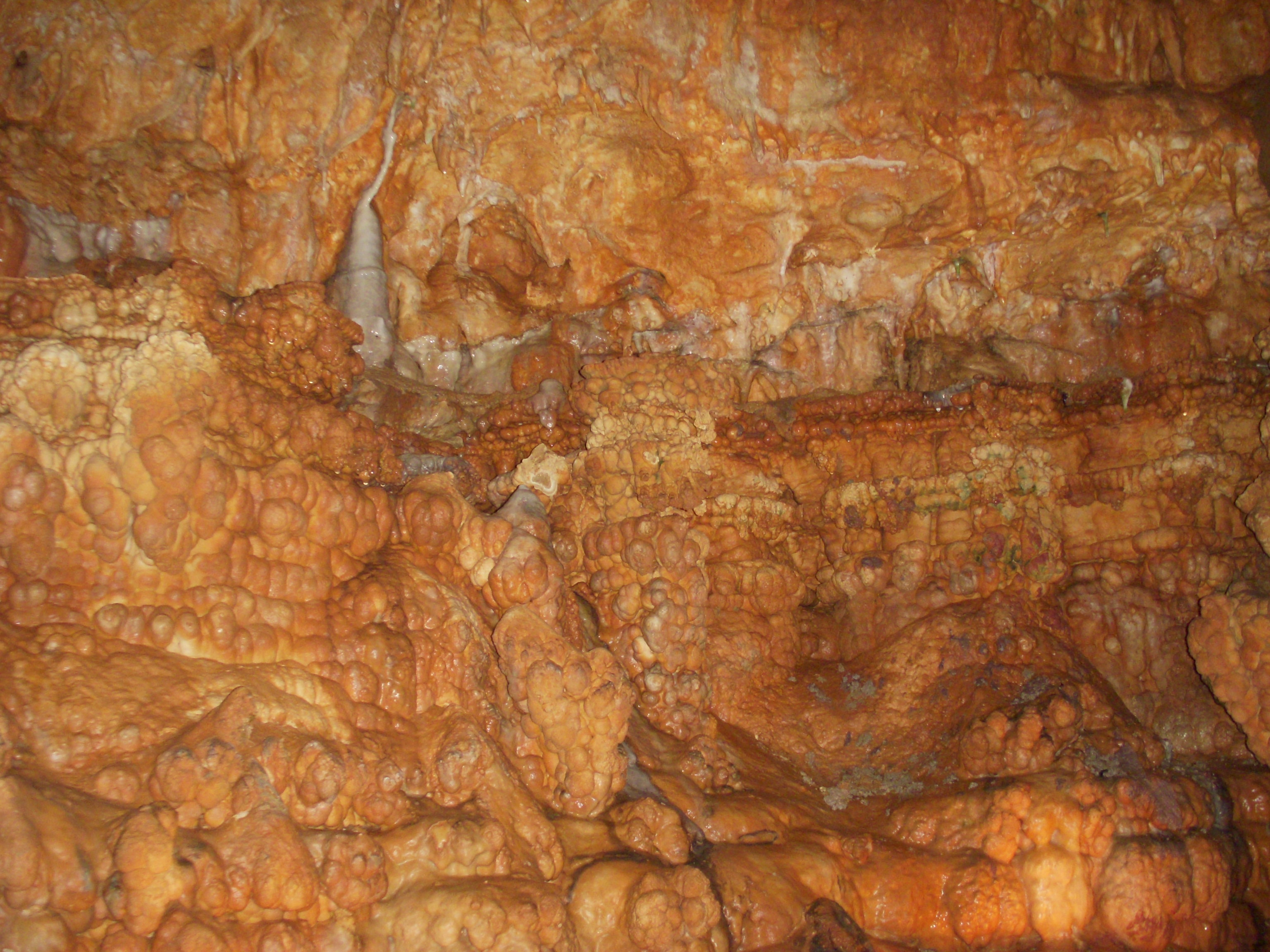

Meramec Caverns is the collective name for a 4.6-mile (7.4 km) cavern system in the Ozarks, near Stanton, Missouri. The caverns were formed from the erosion of large limestone deposits over millions of years. Pre-Columbian Native American artifacts have been found in the caverns. Currently the cavern system is a tourist attraction, with more than fifty billboards along Interstate 44 and is considered one of the primary attractions along former U.S. Highway 66. Meramec Caverns is the most-visited cave in Missouri with some 150,000 visitors annually.

== History ==
The Meramec Caverns have existed for the past 400 million years, slowly forming through deposits of limestone. In centuries past, Native Americans used the cavern system for shelter. The first cave west of the Mississippi River to be explored by Europeans, it was first visited in 1722 by a French miner.

During the 18th century, the cave was used for extracting saltpeter for the manufacture of gunpowder. In the Civil War era, the Union Army used the caves as a saltpeter plant, but the plant was discovered and destroyed by Confederate guerrillas, likely including the future infamous outlaw Jesse James. According to local legend, James and his brother and partner in crime Frank used the caves as a hideout in the 1870s. However, there is scant historical evidence to support this tradition. One legend in particular claims that a sheriff tracking the Jameses sat in front of the cave, waiting for Jesse and his gang to emerge; however, they had found another exit.

In 1933, the extended cave system was discovered, revealing the present 4.6 miles (7.4 km), and was introduced to the public as a tourist attraction in 1935 by Lester B. Dill, who invented the bumper sticker as a means of promoting the caverns.

In 1960, Meramec Caverns rented billboard space in the caverns. The owners claimed this was the only underground billboard in the world. In midsummer of 1972, Meramec Caverns provided the cave settings for Tom Sawyer, a musical film which was released to theaters that following year. In the 1998 movie Deep Impact (film) a reference is made to the limestone caves of Missouri as the location of the ARC shelter.

== Noted attractions ==
=== Wine Room ===
Wine Room

The fifth level of Meramec Caverns includes a "Wine Room." The Wine Room is home to the world's rarest cave formation, The Wine Table. The onyx table stands six feet high and is supported on three natural legs. Known as an aragonite formation, this structure was composed almost entirely underwater. The Wine Room and the Wine Table are adorned with grape-like clusters called botryoids. Originally called the Wine Room because of these grape clusters, the cave now claims that it is called that because of the "whining" that visitors do when they learn that the room is accessible only after climbing numerous stairs (a total of 58 steps).

=== "Greatest Show Under the Earth" ===
Greatest Show Under the Earth

The Cavern also contains a massive sheet wall of formations formed during the past several thousand years, which the cave calls its "stage curtain" and which is also used for displaying the light and sound show called "Greatest Show Under the Earth".

=== "Hollywood" ===
A room within the cavern was used for Hollywood productions, most notably Tom Sawyer (1973). In the particular movie, the site was used as the cave system where Tom Sawyer (Johnny Whitaker) and Becky Thatcher (Jodie Foster) got lost in a cave, as well as Tom Sawyer and Huckleberry Finn (Jeff East) find the hidden gold. An episode of Lassie was also filmed in this part of the cave.

=== Mirror Room ===
The Mirror Room is a room within the cavern that contains a stream of water about 1.5 ft (0.46 m) deep. However, when a group of lights are turned on, the depth of the water is perceived by many to be as great as 50 ft (15 m), due to the reflection of the cavern's roof on the undisturbed water.

=== Ballroom ===
First used in 1890, The Ballroom is a room in the cavern system that was used in earlier times as a room for square dances and other community events. It is now one of the first stops on the tour and is used for a few annual concerts by the Lester Family.
