= Cedar Fork (Boeuf Creek tributary) =

Stream in the US state of Missouri

Cedar Fork is a stream in Franklin County in the U.S. state of Missouri. It is a tributary of Boeuf Creek.

The stream headwaters arise at 38°23′57″N 91°20′15″W just west of Gerald and it flows generally north to its confluence with Boeuf Creek at 38°32′03″N 91°18′28″W. The community of Detmold lies along Boeuf Creek approximately one mile northeast of the confluence.

Cedar Fork was named for the cedar timber along its course.

== See also ==
- List of rivers of Missouri
