= Hemker, Missouri =

Unincorporated community in Missouri

Coordinates: 38°18′26″N 90°46′39″W

Hemker (Hemkerville) was an unincorporated community in Franklin County, in the U.S. state of Missouri, but was dissolved in 1970 after the last residents moved out. The community is now considered part of Robertsville, MO.

== History ==
A post office was established at Hemker in 1885, and remained in operation until 1903. Richard Hemaker, an early postmaster, gave the community his last name.
