= Boles, Missouri =

Unincorporated community in Missouri, U.S.

Coordinates: 38°31′51″N 90°53′24″W

Boles is an unincorporated community in northern Franklin County, in the U.S. state of Missouri.

The community sits above the Missouri River floodplain approximately six miles east of Washington. Labadie lies about 1.5 miles to the east.

== History ==
A post office called Boles was established in 1864 and remained in operation until 1939. The community most likely was named after Boles Township.
