= Anaconda, Missouri =

Unincorporated community in Missouri, U.S.

Coordinates: 38°18′06″N 91°02′27″W

Anaconda is an unincorporated community in southern Franklin County, Missouri, United States. The community is southeast of Interstate 44, between St. Clair and Stanton.

== History ==
Older variant names of the community were Dry Branch and Morrellton. The former variant name is after Dry Branch creek, while the latter variant name honored one Mr. Morrell, a railroad official. The present name may be a transfer from Anaconda, Montana. A post office was established as Dry Branch in 1858. From 1892 until 1893, the post office was called Anaconda. The post office was renamed Morrellton in 1893, and remained in operation until it was discontinued in 1953.

Anaconda was a station on the St. Louis–San Francisco Railway.

In 1925, Anaconda had 110 inhabitants.
