= Central Township, Franklin County, Missouri =

Township in Franklin County, Missouri, U.S.

Coordinates: 38.3508°N 90.9850°W

Central Township is an inactive township in Franklin County, in the U.S. state of Missouri.

This Township contains the communities of Anaconda, Lake St. Clair, Benson Tourist City, Parkway, St. Clair, Piney Park, and Moselle

Central Township was named for its location near the geographical center of Franklin County.
