= Missouri Route 47 =

State highway in Missouri, U.S.

Route 47

Route information
- Maintained by MoDOT
- Length: 119.180 mi (191.802 km)
- Existed: 1922–present

Major junctions
- South end: US 67 / Route K in Bonne Terre
- I-44 in St. Clair; US 50 in Union; I-70 / US 40 in Warrenton; US 61 in Troy
- North end: Route 79 near Winfield

Location
- Country: United States
- State: Missouri

Highway system
- Missouri State Highway System; Interstate; US; State; Supplemental
← Route 46	→ Route 48

Route 47 is a highway in eastern Missouri. Its northern terminus is at Route 79 near Winfield; its southern terminus is at U.S. Route 67 in Bonne Terre.

== Route description ==
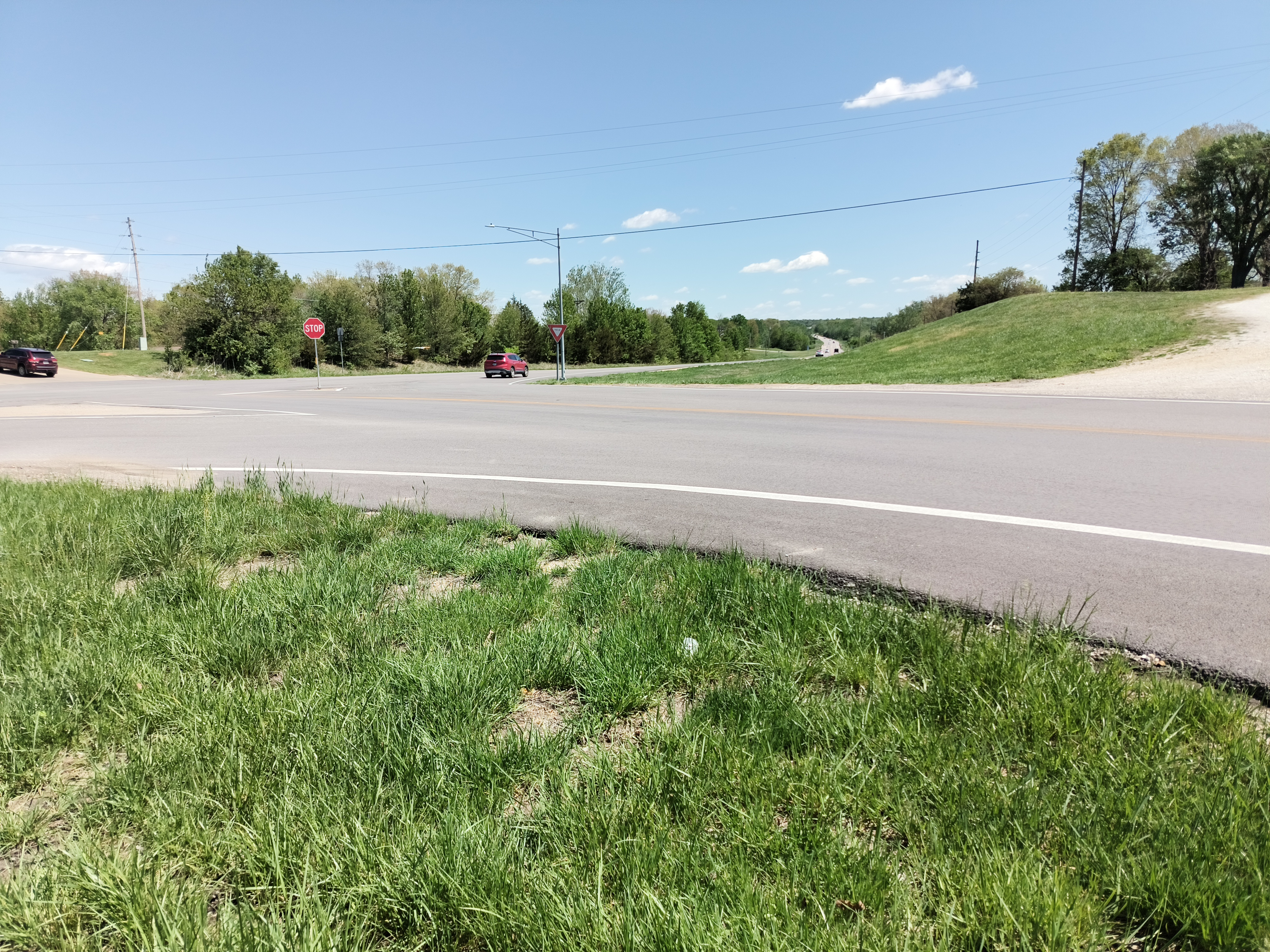
Route 47 in Troy

The highway begins at Route 79 in Winfield, where it travels due west towards Troy and Hawk Point, where it turns south and meets Interstate 70 in Warrenton.

After Warrenton, the highway continues south to Marthasville, where it intersects with Route 94. The two highways share a concurrency through the Missouri River bottomlands for approximately 4 miles to near Dutzow. The highway still continues south across the Missouri River into Washington, where it intersects Route 100.

From Washington, Route 47 goes down to Union, where it meets up with US Route 50. Route 47 runs concurrent with U.S. 50 very shortly before returning south towards St. Clair.

At St. Clair, Route 47 meets Interstate 44, before joining up with Route 30. The highway now runs east with that route for about 8 miles, until returning south. This stretch of highway is very rural, narrow, and windy. It joins up with Route 21 for a short concurrency, before heading east towards Bonne Terre at its terminus with U.S. Route 67.

== History ==
Route 47 is one of the original 1922 state highways. Its original northern terminus was at Troy, its southern terminus was at Villa Ridge. The section between Washington and Villa Ridge became part of Route 100.

== Major intersections ==
County	Location	mi	km	Destinations	Notes
St. Francois	Bonne Terre	0.000	0.000	US 67 – St. Louis; Route K	Roadway continues as Route K
Washington	Old Mines	15.550	25.025	Route 21 south – Potosi	Southern end of Route 21 overlap
Washington	Kingston Township	20.476	32.953	Route 21 north – De Soto	Northern end of Route 21 overlap
Franklin	Prairie Township	40.870	65.774	Route 30 east – Lonedell	Eastern end of Route 30 overlap
Franklin	St. Clair	47.074	75.758	Route 30 west (W. Gravois Ave) to I-44	Western end of Route 30 overlap
Franklin	St. Clair	48.610	78.230	I-44 – St. Louis, Rolla	exit 240
Franklin	Union	54.319	87.418	US 50 east	Eastern end of US 50 overlap. access to East Central College
Franklin	Union	54.769	88.142	US 50 west – Beaufort	Western end of US 50 overlap
Franklin	Washington	61.357	98.745	Route 100 to I-44 – New Haven	
Missouri River		62.608– 62.814	100.758– 101.089	Washington Bridge	
Warren	Charrette Township	65.893	106.045	Route 94 east – Dutzow	Eastern end of Route 94 overlap
Warren	Marthasville	69.723	112.208	Route 94 west – Treloar	Western end of Route 94 overlap
Warren	Warrenton	85.818	138.111	I-70 / US 40 – Wright City, Jonesburg	
Lincoln	Hawk Point	96.550	155.382	Route A / Route D – Truxton	Route 47 changes from a north–south to an east–west orientation
Lincoln	Troy	105.693	170.096	US 61 (Avenue of the Saints) – Wentzville	
Lincoln	Winfield	119.180	191.802	Route 79 / Great River Road – Winfield, Old Monroe, Elsberry	
1.000 mi = 1.609 km; 1.000 km = 0.621 mi: Concurrency terminus
