= Maupin, Missouri =

Unincorporated community in Missouri, U.S.

Coordinates: 38°14′26″N 90°47′02″W

Maupin is an unincorporated community in Franklin County, in the U.S. state of Missouri.

== History ==
A post office called Maupin was established in 1896, and remained in operation until 1942. The community took its name from nearby Maupin Creek.
