= Monday, Missouri =

Unincorporated community in Missouri, U.S.

Coordinates: 38°13′00″N 91°01′17″W

Monday is an unincorporated community in Franklin County, in the U.S. state of Missouri.

== History ==
A post office called Monday was established in 1900, and remained in operation until 1908. C. M. Munday, an early postmaster, gave the community his last name.
