= Oak Grove Village, Missouri =

- Village
- Location of Oak Grove Village, Missouri
- Coordinates: 38°13′40″N 91°08′58″W
- Country: United States
- State: Missouri
- County: Franklin

Area
  - Total: 0.61 sq mi (1.59 km^{2})
  - Land: 0.61 sq mi (1.59 km^{2})
  - Water: 0 sq mi (0.00 km^{2})
- Elevation: 938 ft (286 m)

Population (2020)
  - Total: 412
  - Density: 669.9/sq mi (258.65/km^{2})
- Time zone: UTC-6 (Central (CST))
  - Summer (DST): UTC-5 (CDT)
- ZIP code: 63080
- Area code: 573
- FIPS code: 29-53606
- GNIS feature ID: 2399535

Oak Grove Village is a village in Franklin County, Missouri, United States. As of the 2020 census, Oak Grove Village had a population of 412.

== Geography ==
According to the United States Census Bureau, the village has a total area of 0.64 square miles (1.66 km^{2}), all land.

== Demographics ==
Historical population
Census	Pop.	Note	%±
1970	340		—
1980	386		13.5%
1990	402		4.1%
2000	382		−5.0%
2010	509		33.2%
2020	412		−19.1%
U.S. Decennial Census

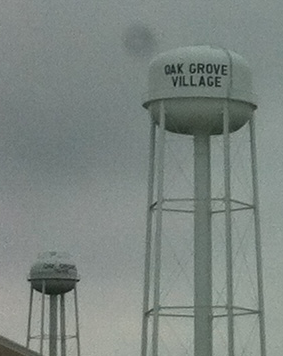
Two water towers in Oak Grove Village

=== 2010 census ===
As of the census of 2010, there were 509 people, 216 households, and 114 families living in the village. The population density was 795.3 inhabitants per square mile (307.1/km^{2}). There were 243 housing units at an average density of 379.7 per square mile (146.6/km^{2}). The racial makeup of the village was 96.5% White, 0.4% African American, 0.4% Native American, 0.2% Asian, 0.2% from other races, and 2.4% from two or more races. Hispanic or Latino of any race were 1.8% of the population.

There were 216 households, of which 31.0% had children under the age of 18 living with them, 30.1% were married couples living together, 16.2% had a female householder with no husband present, 6.5% had a male householder with no wife present, and 47.2% were non-families. 39.8% of all households were made up of individuals, and 20.9% had someone living alone who was 65 years of age or older. The average household size was 2.36 and the average family size was 3.14.

The median age in the village was 33.6 years. 25.3% of residents were under the age of 18; 9.5% were between the ages of 18 and 24; 27.1% were from 25 to 44; 23.8% were from 45 to 64; and 14.3% were 65 years of age or older. The gender makeup of the village was 47.9% male and 52.1% female.

=== 2000 census ===
As of the census of 2000, there were 382 people, 142 households, and 101 families living in the village. The population density was 727.5 inhabitants per square mile (280.9/km^{2}). There were 162 housing units at an average density of 308.5 per square mile (119.1/km^{2}). The racial makeup of the village was 97.91% White, 0.26% Native American, 0.52% Asian, and 1.31% from two or more races. Hispanic or Latino of any race were 1.05% of the population.

There were 142 households, out of which 36.6% had children under the age of 18 living with them, 52.1% were married couples living together, 10.6% had a female householder with no husband present, and 28.2% were non-families. 23.9% of all households were made up of individuals, and 12.0% had someone living alone who was 65 years of age or older. The average household size was 2.69 and the average family size was 3.09.

In the village, the population was spread out, with 28.5% under the age of 18, 10.5% from 18 to 24, 28.8% from 25 to 44, 20.4% from 45 to 64, and 11.8% who were 65 years of age or older. The median age was 33 years. For every 100 females, there were 94.9 males. For every 100 females age 18 and over, there were 95.0 males.

The median income for a household in the village was $35,357, and the median income for a family was $47,500. Males had a median income of $27,813 versus $18,125 for females. The per capita income for the village was $15,390. About 10.6% of families and 13.4% of the population were below the poverty line, including 16.9% of those under age 18 and 16.4% of those age 65 or over.

== Education ==
It is in the Sullivan C-2 School District.
