= Charrette Township, Warren County, Missouri =

Inactive township in Missouri, U.S.

Coordinates: 38.6690°N 91.0778°W

Charrette Township is an inactive township in Warren County, in the U.S. state of Missouri.

Charrette Township takes its name from Charrette Creek.
