= Huff, Missouri =

Unincorporated community in Missouri, U.S.

Coordinates: 38°14′37″N 90°53′07″W

Huff is an unincorporated community in Franklin County, in the U.S. state of Missouri.

== History ==
A post office called Huff was established in 1900, and remained in operation until 1909. The community most likely was named after Andrew Huff, an early settler.
