= Miramiguoa Park, Missouri =

- Village
- Location of Miramiguoa Park, Missouri
- Coordinates: 38°14′20″N 91°04′07″W
- Country: United States
- State: Missouri
- County: Franklin

Area
  - Total: 0.39 sq mi (1.00 km^{2})
  - Land: 0.39 sq mi (1.00 km^{2})
  - Water: 0 sq mi (0.00 km^{2})
- Elevation: 643 ft (196 m)

Population (2020)
  - Total: 126
  - Density: 327.3/sq mi (126.36/km^{2})
- Time zone: UTC-6 (Central (CST))
  - Summer (DST): UTC-5 (CDT)
- FIPS code: 29-48880
- GNIS feature ID: 2399378

Miramiguoa Park is a village in Franklin County, Missouri, United States. As of the 2020 census, Miramiguoa Park had a population of 126.

== Geography ==
According to the United States Census Bureau, the village has a total area of 0.39 square miles (1.01 km^{2}), all land.

== Demographics ==
Historical population
Census	Pop.	Note	%±
2000	127		—
2010	120		−5.5%
2020	126		5.0%
U.S. Decennial Census

=== 2010 census ===
As of the census of 2010, there were 120 people, 50 households, and 32 families living in the village. The population density was 307.7 inhabitants per square mile (118.8/km^{2}). There were 68 housing units at an average density of 174.4 per square mile (67.3/km^{2}). The racial makeup of the village was 98.3% White, 0.8% from other races, and 0.8% from two or more races. Hispanic or Latino of any race were 1.7% of the population.

There were 50 households, of which 24.0% had children under the age of 18 living with them, 46.0% were married couples living together, 12.0% had a female householder with no husband present, 6.0% had a male householder with no wife present, and 36.0% were non-families. 34.0% of all households were made up of individuals, and 12% had someone living alone who was 65 years of age or older. The average household size was 2.40 and the average family size was 3.00.

The median age in the village was 45 years. 21.7% of residents were under the age of 18; 7.6% were between the ages of 18 and 24; 20.9% were from 25 to 44; 35.8% were from 45 to 64; and 14.2% were 65 years of age or older. The gender makeup of the village was 45.8% male and 54.2% female.

=== 2000 census ===
As of the census of 2000, there were 127 people, 47 households, and 32 families living in the village. The population density was 329.8 inhabitants per square mile (127.3/km^{2}). There were 63 housing units at an average density of 163.6 per square mile (63.2/km^{2}). The racial makeup of the village was 96.85% White, 0.79% Asian, 1.57% from other races, and 0.79% from two or more races. Hispanic or Latino of any race were 1.57% of the population.

There were 47 households, out of which 31.9% had children under the age of 18 living with them, 46.8% were married couples living together, 12.8% had a female householder with no husband present, and 29.8% were non-families. 23.4% of all households were made up of individuals, and 6.4% had someone living alone who was 65 years of age or older. The average household size was 2.70 and the average family size was 3.18.

In the village, the population was spread out, with 30.7% under the age of 18, 7.1% from 18 to 24, 29.1% from 25 to 44, 21.3% from 45 to 64, and 11.8% who were 65 years of age or older. The median age was 34 years. For every 100 females, there were 111.7 males. For every 100 females age 18 and over, there were 104.7 males.

The median income for a household in the village was $28,750, and the median income for a family was $43,750. Males had a median income of $31,000 versus $25,833 for females. The per capita income for the village was $12,141. There were 10.0% of families and 21.4% of the population living below the poverty line, including 30.0% of under eighteens and none of those over 64.

== Education ==
It is in the Sullivan C-2 School District.
