= Charrette Creek =

Stream in the US state of Missouri

Coordinates: 38°33′36″N 90°59′59″W

Charrette Creek is a stream in Warren County in the U.S. state of Missouri. It is a tributary of the Missouri River. The headwaters of the stream are at and the confluence with the Missouri is at . The stream enters the Missouri River floodplain two miles west of Marthasville and joins the Missouri about four miles to the east just north of Washington.

Charrette Creek most likely has the name of a French frontiersman, possibly Joseph Chorette. Many variant forms of the name have been recorded, including "Charet Creek", "Charette Creek", "Cherette River", "Cherrette Creek", "Chorette Creek", "Choritte Creek", "La Charrette", and "Rivera a Chouritte".

== See also ==
- List of rivers of Missouri
