= Oetters, Missouri =

Unincorporated community in Missouri, U.S.

Coordinates: 38°33′19″N 90°47′37″W

Oetters is an unincorporated community in Franklin County, Missouri. The community is situated above the Missouri River floodplain along Missouri Route T. Fiddle Creek flows adjacent to the community as it enters the Missouri River floodplain.

The community is most likely named after Henry Oeters, the original owner of the site.
