= Krakow, Missouri =

Unincorporated community in Missouri, U.S.

Coordinates: 38°29′51″N 91°02′45″W

Krakow is an unincorporated community in Franklin County, in the U.S. state of Missouri. The community is situated on Missouri Route A, between Union to the south and Washington to the north.

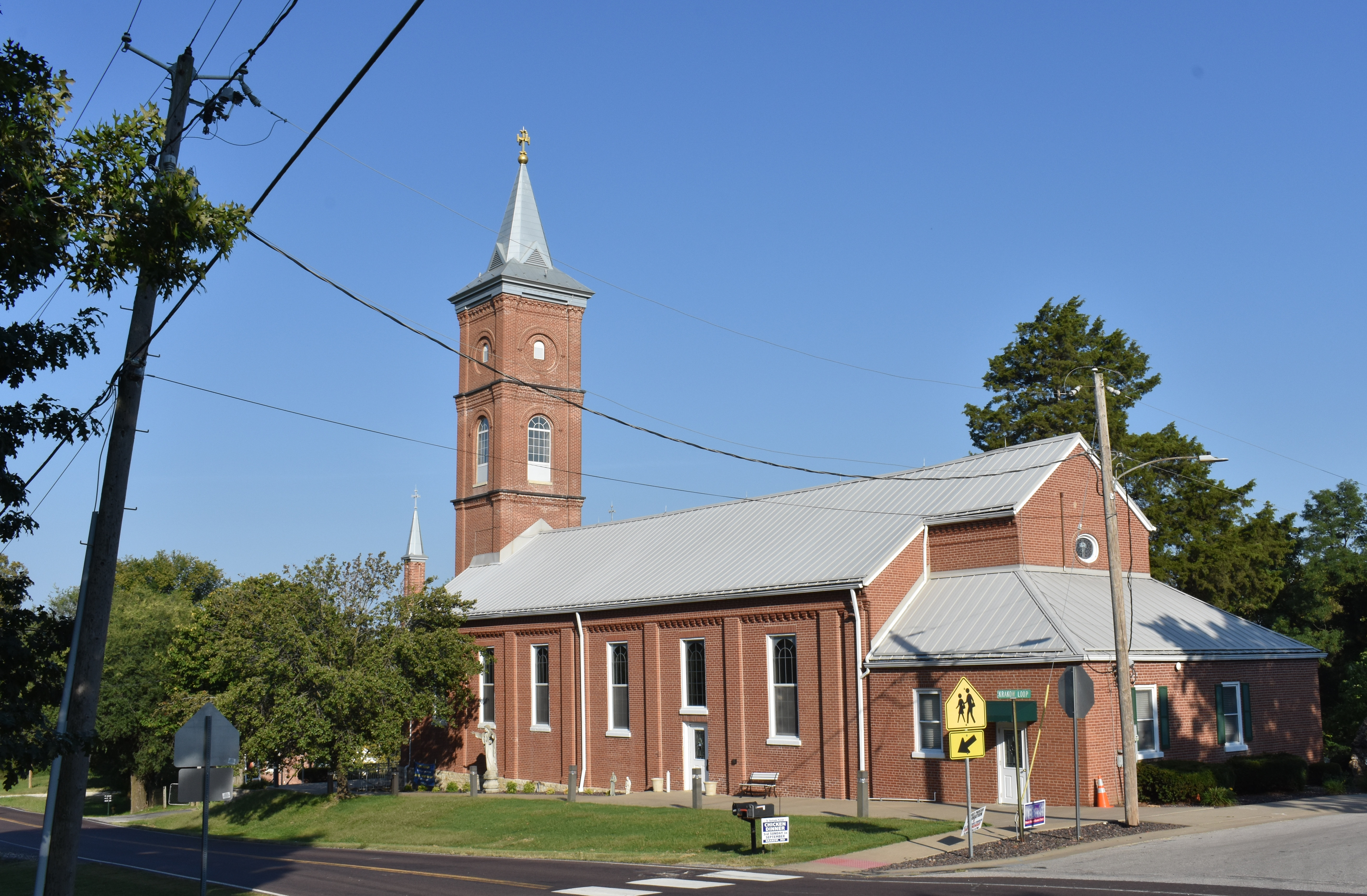
St. Gertrude Catholic Church in Krakow.

== History ==
A post office called Krakow was established in 1871, and remained in operation until 1953. The community was named after Kraków, formerly in Austria-Hungary (now Poland), the native home of a share of the early settlers. In 1870 – 1872, a local newspaper in Polish was published, called Orzeł Polski.
