= Port Hudson, Missouri =

Unincorporated community in Missouri

Coordinates: 38°27′14″N 91°15′15″W

Port Hudson is an unincorporated community in western Franklin County, in the U.S. state of Missouri. The community is on Missouri Route C and approximately two miles north of Leslie and US Route 50.

== History ==
A post office called Port Hudson was established in 1859, and remained in operation until 1909. The community's name most likely is a transfer from Port Hudson, Louisiana.

A 1970 propane vapor cloud explosion in Port Hudson in Missouri resulted from a propane pipeline break, which led to the formation of a large, dense vapor cloud. Upon ignition, the vapor cloud exploded with tremendous force. Both near- and far-field damage indicate that this explosion may be attributed to the detonation of propane in air with an energy release equivalent to that from about 50 tons of detonating trinitrotoluene (TNT).
