= Calvey Township, Franklin County, Missouri =

Coordinates: 38.3753°N 90.7939°W

Calvey Township, Missouri
- Township
- Interactive map of Calvey Township, Missouri
- Country: United States of America
- State: Missouri
- County: Franklin

Area
  - Total: 41.49 sq mi (107.46 km^{2})

Population (2010)
  - Total: 3,194
  - Density: 76.98/sq mi (29.72/km^{2})
- Demonym: Calvier
- Time zone: UTC−6 (Central (CST))
  - Summer (DST): UTC−5 (CDT)

Calvey Township is an unincorporated township in Franklin County, in the U.S. state of Missouri.

This Township contains the Communities of Robertsville and Catwissa

Calvey Township was established in 1821, and named after Calvey Creek.
