= Villa Ridge, Missouri =

- Census-designated place
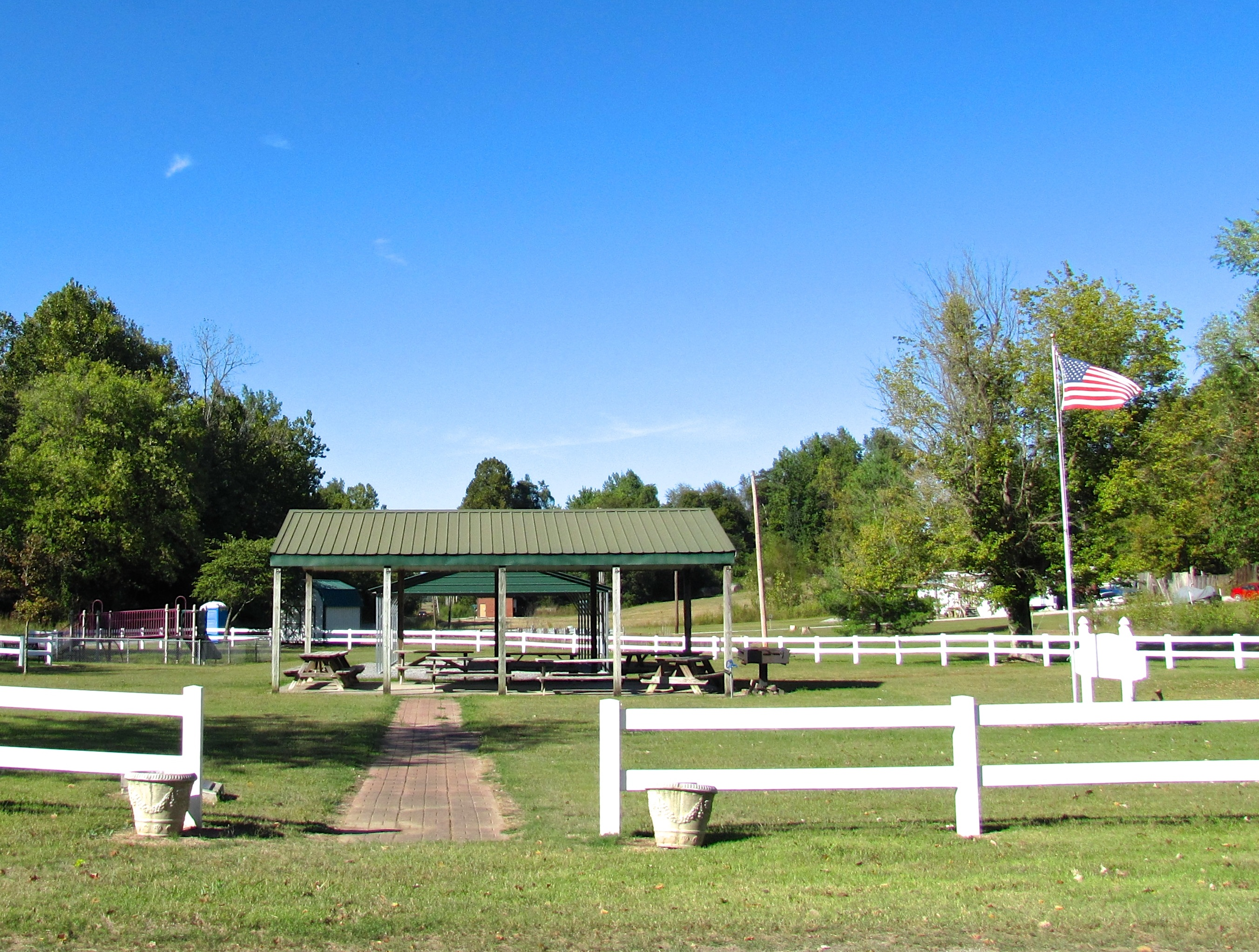
- Villa Ridge Park

- Location of Villa Ridge, Missouri
- Coordinates: 38°28′05″N 90°53′05″W
- Country: United States
- State: Missouri
- County: Franklin

Area
  - Total: 4.95 sq mi (12.81 km^{2})
  - Land: 4.92 sq mi (12.73 km^{2})
  - Water: 0.031 sq mi (0.08 km^{2})
- Elevation: 663 ft (202 m)

Population (2020)
  - Total: 2,601
  - Density: 529.3/sq mi (204.37/km^{2})
- Time zone: UTC-6 (Central (CST))
  - Summer (DST): UTC-5 (CDT)
- ZIP code: 63089
- Area code: 636
- FIPS code: 29-76192
- GNIS feature ID: 2393833

Villa Ridge is an unincorporated community and census-designated place (CDP) in Franklin County, Missouri, United States. The population was 2,601 at the 2020 census, down from 2,636 at the 2010 census.

== History ==
A post office called Villa Ridge has been in operation since 1889. The community was named for a ridge near the town site, with villa meaning "town".

== Geography ==
Villa Ridge is located in northeastern Franklin County. It is on Missouri Route M between Interstate 44 two miles to the south and Missouri Route 100 one mile north. Pacific is seven miles east and Union is six miles to the west.

According to the United States Census Bureau, the CDP has a total area of 4.9 square miles (12.7 km^{2}), of which 0.031 square miles (0.08 km^{2}), or 0.65%, is water.

== Demographics ==
Historical population
Census	Pop.	Note	%±
2000	2,417		—
2010	2,636		9.1%
2020	2,601		−1.3%
U.S. Decennial Census

=== 2020 census ===
As of the 2020 census, Villa Ridge had a population of 2,601. The median age was 43.3 years. 23.2% of residents were under the age of 18 and 17.7% of residents were 65 years of age or older. For every 100 females there were 101.9 males, and for every 100 females age 18 and over there were 102.4 males age 18 and over.

14.5% of residents lived in urban areas, while 85.5% lived in rural areas.

There were 979 households in Villa Ridge, of which 28.4% had children under the age of 18 living in them. Of all households, 57.9% were married-couple households, 17.0% were households with a male householder and no spouse or partner present, and 17.6% were households with a female householder and no spouse or partner present. About 21.7% of all households were made up of individuals and 8.5% had someone living alone who was 65 years of age or older.

There were 1,055 housing units, of which 7.2% were vacant. The homeowner vacancy rate was 1.4% and the rental vacancy rate was 8.9%.

Racial composition as of the 2020 census
Race	Number	Percent
White	2,315	89.0%
Black or African American	49	1.9%
American Indian and Alaska Native	9	0.3%
Asian	8	0.3%
Native Hawaiian and Other Pacific Islander	0	0.0%
Some other race	23	0.9%
Two or more races	197	7.6%
Hispanic or Latino (of any race)	70	2.7%

=== 2000 census ===
As of the census of 2000, there were 2,417 people, 869 households, and 678 families residing in the CDP. The population density was 489.9 inhabitants per square mile (189.2/km^{2}). There were 928 housing units at an average density of 188.1 per square mile (72.6/km^{2}). The racial makeup of the CDP was 95.66% White, 2.48% African American, 0.41% Native American, 0.33% Asian, 0.29% from other races, and 0.83% from two or more races. Hispanic or Latino of any race were 0.91% of the population.

There were 869 households, out of which 37.9% had children under the age of 18 living with them, 66.5% were married couples living together, 8.4% had a female householder with no husband present, and 21.9% were non-families. 17.3% of all households were made up of individuals, and 6.1% had someone living alone who was 65 years of age or older. The average household size was 2.78 and the average family size was 3.14.

In the CDP, the population was spread out, with 28.5% under the age of 18, 7.2% from 18 to 24, 31.4% from 25 to 44, 22.1% from 45 to 64, and 10.8% who were 65 years of age or older. The median age was 35 years. For every 100 females, there were 97.6 males. For every 100 females age 18 and over, there were 98.1 males.

The median income for a household in the CDP was $45,045, and the median income for a family was $46,762. Males had a median income of $41,875 versus $20,441 for females. The per capita income for the CDP was $18,378. About 1.8% of families and 4.7% of the population were below the poverty line, including .46% of those under age 18 and 99% of those age 65 or over.

== Education ==
The vast majority of Villa Ridge is in the Meramec Valley R-III School District. A small piece is in the Washington School District.

The comprehensive high school of the Washington school district is Washington High School.
