= Robertsville, Missouri =

Unincorporated community in Missouri, U.S.

Coordinates: 38°24′53″N 90°48′50″W

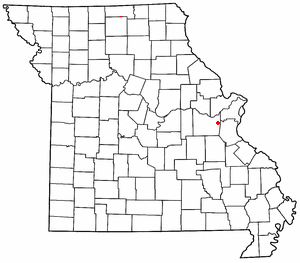

Robertsville is an unincorporated community in eastern Franklin County, Missouri, United States. It is located approximately six miles (10 km) southwest of Pacific on Missouri Route O and is home to the 1,225-acre (4.96 km^{2}) Robertsville State Park.

== History ==
A post office called Robertsville has been in operation since 1859. The community was laid out by Edward James Roberts and named after him.

On December 31, 2010, an EF2 tornado devastated Robertsville.
