= Meramec Township, Jefferson County, Missouri =

Inactive township in the US state of Missouri

Meramec Township
- Inactive Township
- Lalumondiere Mill Bridge over the Big River
- Interactive map of Meramec Township
- Coordinates: 38.426°N 90.568°W
- Country: United States of America
- State: Missouri
- County: Jefferson

Area
  - Total: 96.8 sq mi (251 km^{2})

Population (2020)
  - Total: 18,869
  - Density: 195/sq mi (75.3/km^{2})
- GNIS feature ID: 766825

Meramec Township is an inactive township in Jefferson County, in the U.S. state of Missouri.

Meramec Township was established in 1821, taking its name from the Meramec River.
