= Stanton, Missouri =

- Census-Designated Place
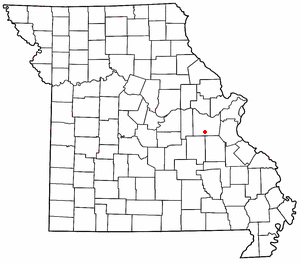
- Location of Stanton in Missouri
- Country: United States
- State: Missouri
- County: Franklin

Area
  - Total: 3.27 sq mi (8.47 km^{2})
  - Land: 3.27 sq mi (8.47 km^{2})
  - Water: 0 sq mi (0.00 km^{2})
- Elevation: 879 ft (268 m)

Population (2020)
  - Total: 366
  - Density: 112.0/sq mi (43.23/km^{2})
- ZIP code: 63080
- Area code: 573
- FIPS code: 29-70342
- GNIS feature ID: 2806401

Stanton is an unincorporated community and census-designated place in southern Franklin County, Missouri, United States. It lies on Interstate 44 at the junction with Missouri Supplemental Route W, which provides access to Meramec Caverns, located approximately two miles southeast along the Meramec River.

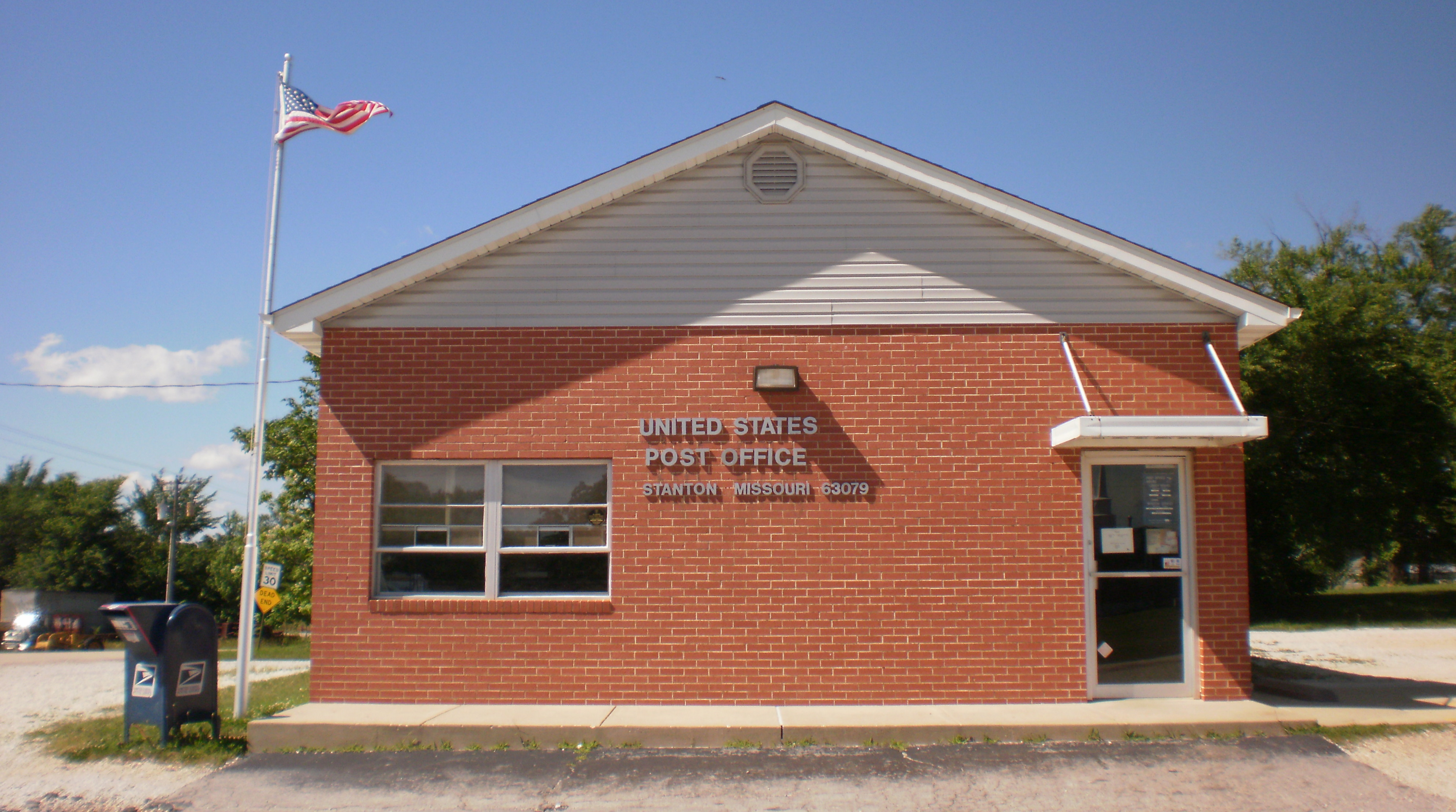
Stanton Post Office, 63079

A post office called Stanton has been in operation since 1857. The community took its name from the nearby Stanton copper mines.

== Demographics ==
Historical population
Census	Pop.	Note	%±
2020	366		—
U.S. Decennial Census

Stanton first appeared as a census designated place in the 2020 U.S. census.

== Education ==
It is in the Sullivan C-2 School District.
