= Lonedell, Missouri =

Unincorporated community in Missouri, U.S.

Coordinates: 38°18′29″N 90°49′39″W

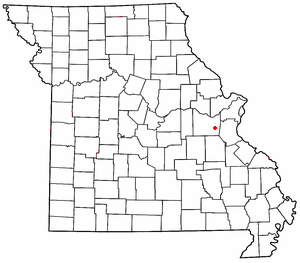

Lonedell is an unincorporated community in southeastern Franklin County, Missouri, United States. It is at the intersection of Route 30 and routes N and FF and approximately eight miles east of St. Clair. The Little Meramac River flows just south of the community.

A post office called Lone Dell was established in 1879, and the spelling was changed to Lonedell in 1895. The community was named for the remote dell in which it is located. The ZIP Code for Lonedell is 63060.
