= Beaufort, Missouri =

Unincorporated community in Missouri, U.S.

Coordinates: 38°25′15″N 91°11′21″W

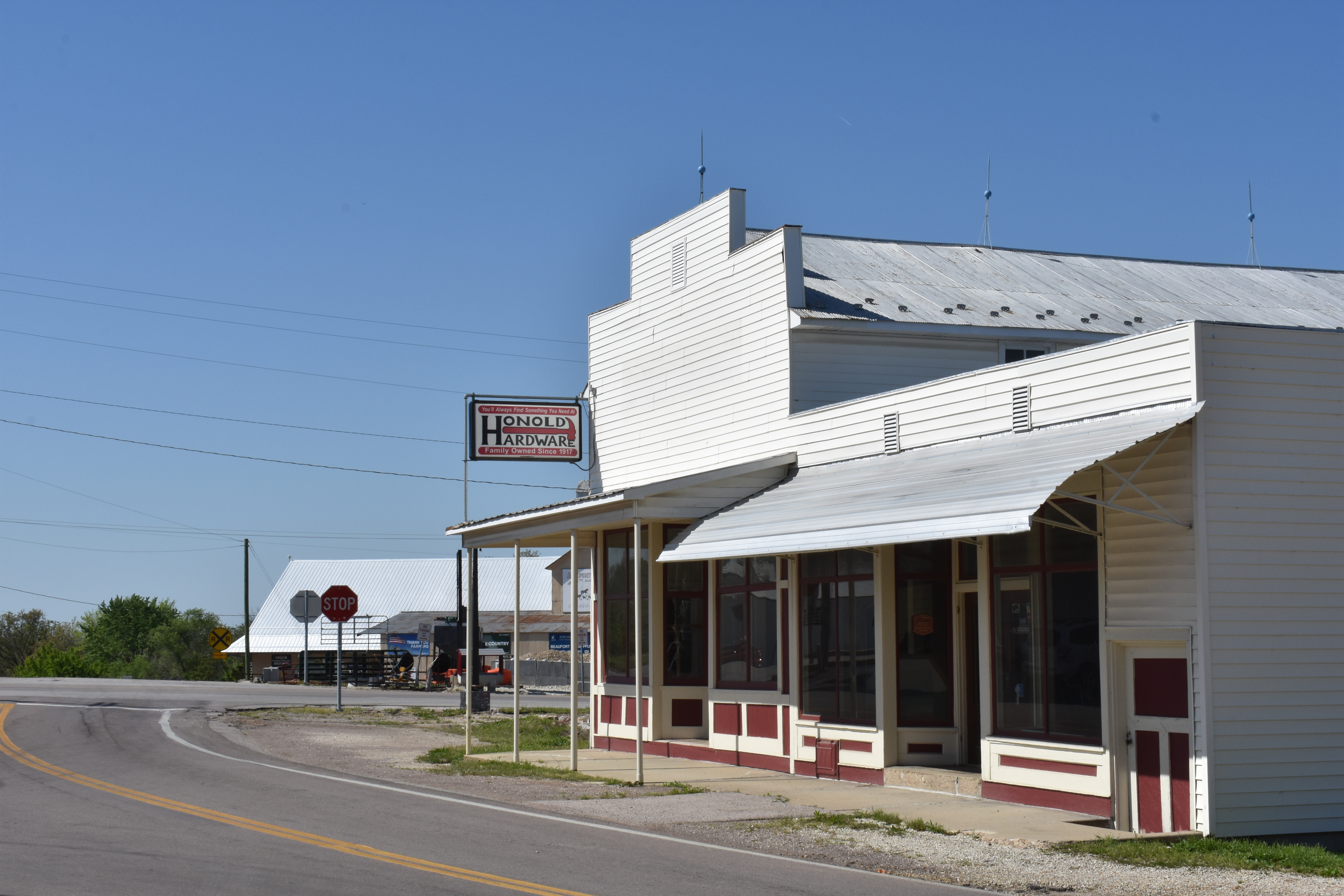
Beaufort, Missouri facing south on Route 185

Beaufort is an unincorporated community in western Franklin County, Missouri, United States. It is located at the intersection of U.S. Route 50 and Route 185, approximately 11 miles (18 km) west of Union.

== History ==
The first settlement at Beaufort was made in 1849, but the entire town was moved to its present site in 1887 when the railroad was extended to that point. A post office called Beaufort has been in operation since 1849. The community most likely takes its name from Beaufort, South Carolina, the native home of an early postmaster. The ZIP code for Beaufort is 63013.

== See also ==
Category:Populated places in Franklin County, Missouri

Unincorporated community
