= Union, Missouri =

- City
- City of Union
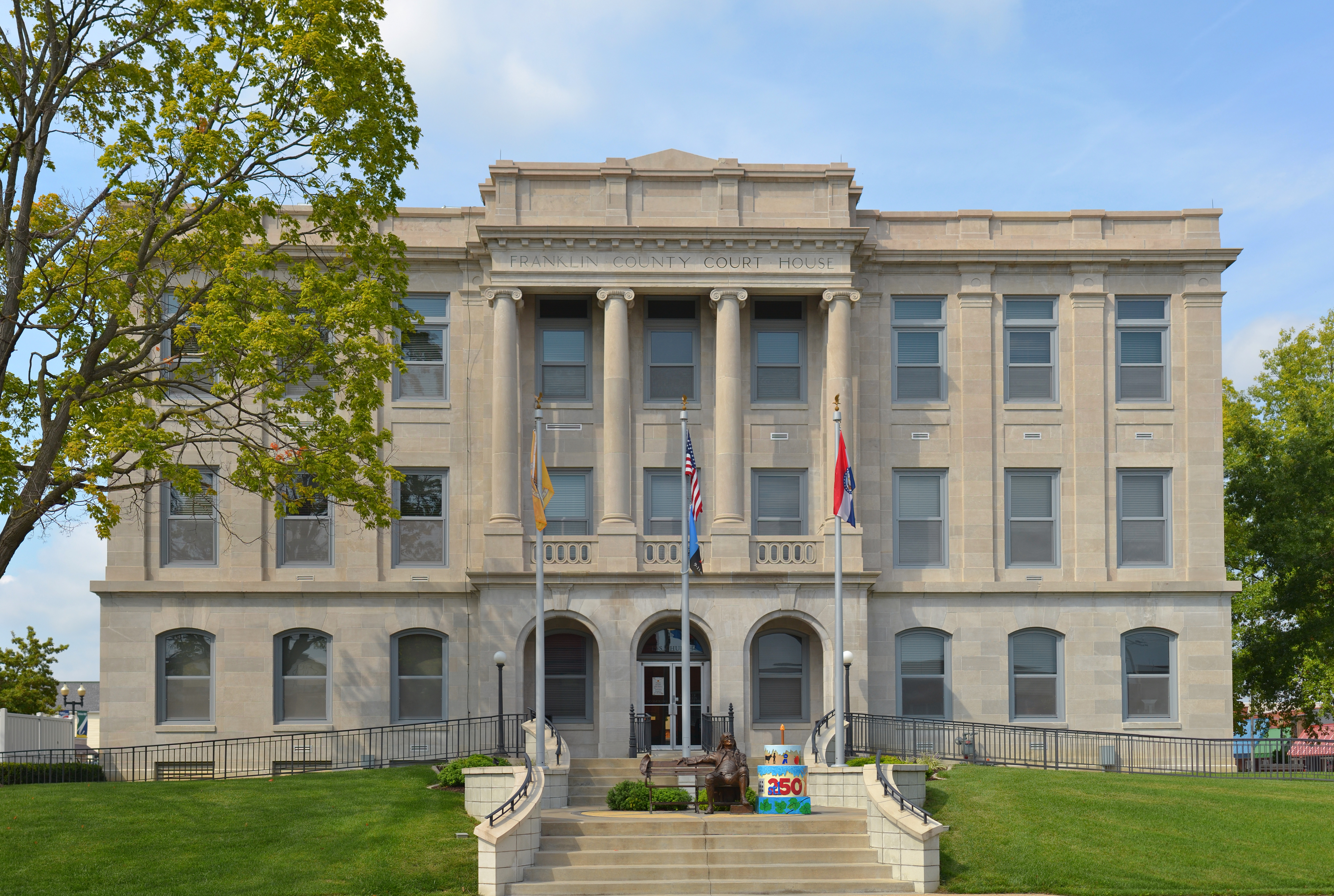
- Downtown Union Union City Auditorium Old Post Office Vitt's Mill Queen Anne style House in Union Franklin County Courthouse
- Motto: Treasuring Our Past, Building For Our Future.
- Location of Union, Missouri
- Coordinates: 38°26′59″N 91°01′04″W
- Country: United States
- State: Missouri
- County: Franklin
- Founded: 1826
- Designated (as the county seat): 1827
- Named for: The ideal of political unity.

Area
  - Total: 9.03 sq mi (23.38 km^{2})
  - Land: 9.03 sq mi (23.38 km^{2})
  - Water: 0 sq mi (0.00 km^{2})
- Elevation: 528 ft (161 m)

Population (2020)
  - Total: 12,348
  - Density: 1,368.2/sq mi (528.25/km^{2})
- Time zone: UTC-6 (Central (CST))
  - Summer (DST): UTC-5 (CDT)
- ZIP code: 63084
- Area code: 636
- FIPS code: 29-74626
- GNIS feature ID: 2397086
- Website: www.unionmissouri.gov

Union is a city in and the county seat of Franklin County, Missouri, United States. It is located on the Bourbeuse River, 50 miles (80 km) southwest of St. Louis. The population was 12,348 at the 2020 census and predicted to be around at 13,507 in 2026.

== History ==
Union was founded in 1826 and designated as the county seat in 1827. The city is named for the ideal of political unity. A post office called Union has been in operation since 1827.

Early German settlers established themselves in and around Franklin County, including what would later be known as Union. German architecture, culture, and especially surnames are still prevalent around Union and surrounding areas. Depending on the definition, the city is within or near a region known as the Missouri Rhineland.

== Geography ==
The city is located on the northwest side of the Bourbeuse River. US Route 50 passes through the city and I-44 is approximately five miles to the east. Washington, on the Missouri River, is seven miles to the north on Missouri Route 47.

According to the United States Census Bureau, the city has a total area of 9.16 square miles (23.72 km^{2}), all land.

=== Climate ===
Climate data for Union, Missouri (1991–2020)
Month	Jan	Feb	Mar	Apr	May	Jun	Jul	Aug	Sep	Oct	Nov	Dec	Year
Mean daily maximum °F (°C)	43.0 (6.1)	48.3 (9.1)	59.1 (15.1)	70.4 (21.3)	78.1 (25.6)	86.2 (30.1)	90.6 (32.6)	89.4 (31.9)	81.7 (27.6)	70.2 (21.2)	57.3 (14.1)	46.1 (7.8)	68.4 (20.2)
Daily mean °F (°C)	33.0 (0.6)	37.2 (2.9)	47.2 (8.4)	57.7 (14.3)	66.5 (19.2)	74.7 (23.7)	79.0 (26.1)	77.6 (25.3)	69.3 (20.7)	57.9 (14.4)	46.1 (7.8)	36.7 (2.6)	56.9 (13.8)
Mean daily minimum °F (°C)	22.9 (−5.1)	26.1 (−3.3)	35.3 (1.8)	45.0 (7.2)	54.8 (12.7)	63.3 (17.4)	67.4 (19.7)	65.8 (18.8)	57.0 (13.9)	45.6 (7.6)	35.0 (1.7)	27.2 (−2.7)	45.5 (7.5)
Average precipitation inches (mm)	2.72 (69)	2.45 (62)	3.87 (98)	4.99 (127)	4.85 (123)	4.24 (108)	4.74 (120)	3.84 (98)	3.63 (92)	3.31 (84)	3.66 (93)	2.66 (68)	44.96 (1,142)
Average snowfall inches (cm)	4.7 (12)	4.1 (10)	1.8 (4.6)	0.2 (0.51)	0.0 (0.0)	0.0 (0.0)	0.0 (0.0)	0.0 (0.0)	0.0 (0.0)	0.0 (0.0)	0.7 (1.8)	2.9 (7.4)	14.4 (36.31)
Source: NOAA

== Demographics ==
Historical population
Census	Pop.	Note	%±
1880	402		—
1890	610		51.7%
1900	744		22.0%
1910	934		25.5%
1920	1,605		71.8%
1930	2,143		33.5%
1940	2,125		−0.8%
1950	2,917		37.3%
1960	3,937		35.0%
1970	5,183		31.6%
1980	5,506		6.2%
1990	5,909		7.3%
2000	7,757		31.3%
2010	10,204		31.5%
2020	12,348		21.0%
U.S. Decennial Census

=== 2020 census ===
As of the 2020 census, Union had a population of 12,348 and 3,023 families. The median age was 34.6 years. 26.6% of residents were under the age of 18 and 14.5% of residents were 65 years of age or older. For every 100 females there were 94.9 males, and for every 100 females age 18 and over there were 91.0 males age 18 and over.

96.7% of residents lived in urban areas, while 3.3% lived in rural areas.

There were 4,806 households in Union, of which 34.6% had children under the age of 18 living in them. Of all households, 42.9% were married-couple households, 18.0% were households with a male householder and no spouse or partner present, and 29.5% were households with a female householder and no spouse or partner present. About 28.7% of all households were made up of individuals and 11.5% had someone living alone who was 65 years of age or older.

There were 5,088 housing units, of which 5.5% were vacant. The homeowner vacancy rate was 1.2% and the rental vacancy rate was 5.1%.

Racial composition as of the 2020 census
Race	Number	Percent
White	11,071	89.7%
Black or African American	187	1.5%
American Indian and Alaska Native	52	0.4%
Asian	70	0.6%
Native Hawaiian and Other Pacific Islander	5	0.0%
Some other race	112	0.9%
Two or more races	851	6.9%
Hispanic or Latino (of any race)	350	2.8%

=== Income and poverty ===
The 2016–2020 5-year American Community Survey estimates show that the median household income was $54,585 (with a margin of error of +/- $4,873) and the median family income was $63,345 (+/- $8,741). Males had a median income of $36,124 (+/- $2,199) versus $31,443 (+/- $5,041) for females. The median income for those above 16 years old was $34,505 (+/- $2,581). Approximately, 7.8% of families and 9.2% of the population were below the poverty line, including 14.6% of those under the age of 18 and 9.4% of those ages 65 or over.

=== 2010 census ===
As of the census of 2010, there were 10,204 people, 3,902 households, and 2,612 families living in the city. The population density was 1,114.0 inhabitants per square mile (430.1/km^{2}). There were 4,226 housing units at an average density of 461.4 per square mile (178.1/km^{2}). The racial makeup of the city was 95.7% White, 1.1% African American, 0.6% Native American, 0.4% Asian, 0.5% from other races, and 1.6% from two or more races. Hispanic or Latino of any race were 1.4% of the population.

There were 3,902 households, of which 39.1% had children under the age of 18 living with them, 47.7% were married couples living together, 13.1% had a female householder with no husband present, 6.1% had a male householder with no wife present, and 33.1% were non-families. 27.1% of all households were made up of individuals, and 10.8% had someone living alone who was 65 years of age or older. The average household size was 2.59 and the average family size was 3.14.

The median age in the city was 31.9 years. 28.2% of residents were under the age of 18; 9.9% were between the ages of 18 and 24; 29.1% were from 25 to 44; 21.4% were from 45 to 64; and 11.5% were 65 years of age or older. The gender makeup of the city was 48.3% male and 51.7% female.

=== 2000 census ===
As of the 2000 United States census, there were 7,757 people, 2,940 households, and 2,002 families living in the city. The population density was 959.9 inhabitants per square mile (370.6/km^{2}). There were 3,133 housing units at an average density of 387.7 per square mile (149.7/km^{2}). The racial makeup of the city was 96.44% White, 1.43% African American, 0.30% Native American, 0.17% Asian, 0.23% from other races, and 1.43% from two or more races. Hispanic or Latino of any race were 0.99% of the population.

There were 2,940 households, out of which 35.7% had children under the age of 18 living with them, 52.7% were married couples living together, 11.5% had a female householder with no husband present, and 31.9% were non-families. 26.8% of all households were made up of individuals, and 11.1% had someone living alone who was 65 years of age or older. The average household size was 2.56 and the average family size was 3.10.

The median income for a household in the city was $39,596, and the median income for a family was $44,474. Males had a median income of $31,852 versus $22,924 for females. The per capita income for the city was $16,885. About 4.2% of families and 7.2% of the population were below the poverty line, including 4.8% of those under age 18 and 11.2% of those age 65 or over.

== Government ==
The City of Union is a 4th Class City with a City Administrator form of government. The elected, policy-making body of the City consists of a Mayor and an eight-member Board of Aldermen. Union is divided into four wards and each ward has two aldermanic representatives. Municipal elections are held on the first Tuesday of April every year.

== Transportation ==
=== Rail ===
Missouri Eastern Railroad, a division of Jaguar Transport, provides regular freight rail service to industrial customers located in Union. MER operates the far eastern segment of the former Chicago, Rock Island and Pacific Railway's St. Louis to Kansas City main line that was constructed in 1870. The active portion of the former CRI&P line runs from the north side of St. Louis, where it connects with the Terminal Railroad Association of St. Louis and Union Pacific Railroad, and now terminates in Union, Missouri.

=== Roads ===
Union is located on the junction of US Route 50 and Route 47. I-44 runs east and south of Union. A proposal for an expressway to bypass the junction of US 50 and Route 47 was cancelled due to complications. There is another proposal to make US 50 from Union to I-44 four lanes and eventually through the rest of Franklin County.

== Education ==
The only public secondary school is Union High School (The UHS Wildcats), which enrolls ninth through twelfth grades. There is one public middle school (The UMS Wildcats) serving sixth through eighth grades, and two public elementary schools (Central Elementary and Prairie Dell Elementary, also the Wildcats) with both serving kindergarten through fifth grades. Union also has one private Catholic school, Immaculate Conception (Serving Pre-K to eighth grade).

Union is home to East Central College, which offers two-year degrees and certificates. Central Methodist University has an extension on the ECC campus. Union is also home to an extension of Missouri Baptist University.

Union has a public library, a branch of the Scenic Regional Library System.

== Economy ==
The Missouri Meerschaum company, founded in 1869 is the first and oldest manufacturer of corn-cob pipes. With the introduction of the railroad in the late 1800s, Union saw an increase in population which in turn, increased the need for job opportunities. In 1907, The National Cob Pipe Works was opened to help fulfill the need for jobs in the area. In less than 10 years, it became one of the largest corn cob pipe manufacturers in the world, producing at least five million cob pipes a year. By 1925, there were almost a dozen corn cob pipes spread across Franklin County. The only surviving corn cob pipe factory left is the original Missouri Meerschaum Company located in Washington, Missouri.

Presently, there are over 300 businesses in Union, including the presence of manufacturers such as the Esselte Pendaflex Corporation and Silgan Plastic Containers.

== Notable people ==
- Antonina Armato (1968-), songwriter and record producer, born in Union
- Paul J. Mueller (1892–1964), United States Army personnel
- William L. Nicholson (1926–2020), United States Air Force general
- Kenneth Roderick O'Neal (1908–1989), architect, born in Union
- Matt Rahl (1981-), Head Football Coach (Presbyterian College), graduated from Union High School

== See also ==
- List of cities in Missouri
