= Franklin County, Missouri =

County in Missouri, United States

- County
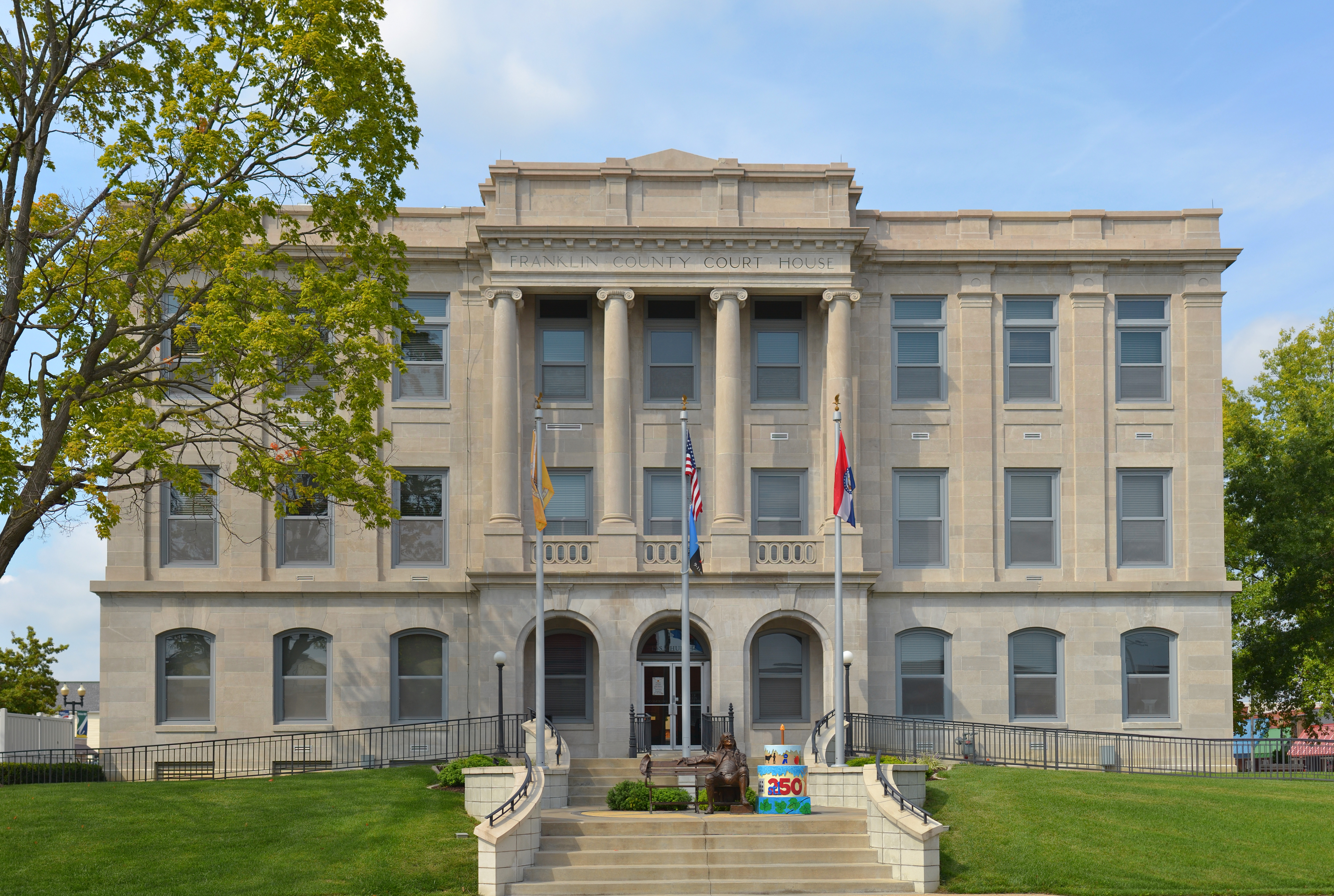
- The Franklin County Courthouse in Union

- Seal

- Location within the U.S. state of Missouri
- Coordinates: 38°25′N 91°05′W
- Country: United States
- State: Missouri
- Founded: December 11, 1818
- Named for: Benjamin Franklin
- Seat: Union
- Largest city: Washington

Area
  - Total: 931 sq mi (2,410 km^{2})
  - Land: 923 sq mi (2,390 km^{2})
  - Water: 8.0 sq mi (21 km^{2}) 0.9%

Population (2020)
  - Total: 104,682
  - Estimate (2025): 108,090 ▲
  - Density: 110/sq mi (42/km^{2})
- Time zone: UTC−6 (Central)
  - Summer (DST): UTC−5 (CDT)
- Congressional district: 2nd
- Website: www.franklinmo.org

Franklin County is located in the U.S. state of Missouri. At the 2020 census, the population was 104,682. Its county seat is Union. The county was organized in 1818 and is named after Founding Father Benjamin Franklin. Franklin County is part of the St. Louis, MO-IL Metropolitan Statistical Area and contains some of the city's exurbs. It is located along the south side of the Missouri River. The county has wineries that are included in the Hermann AVA (American Viticultural Area) and is part of the region known as the Missouri Rhineland, which extends on both sides of the Missouri River.

== History ==
Occupied by succeeding cultures of indigenous peoples, this area was populated by the historic Osage tribe at the time of European encounter. The region was first settled by Europeans during the rule of the Spanish Empire. The Spanish log fort San Juan del Misuri (1796–1803) was built in present-day Washington. After the American Revolutionary War, migrants from the new United States started moving West. Among them were the family and followers of Daniel Boone, an explorer from Kentucky who settled the area starting in 1799. For the next two decades, most settlers came from the Upper South, especially Kentucky and Virginia, bringing their slaves with them to work the land.

In 1833 substantial numbers of German immigrant families began settling in the area, and soon they outnumbered the slave owners in the county. The German newcomers were opposed to slavery, and their sons would become Union supporters during the U.S. Civil War. Former governor and then Confederate General Sterling Price led his cavalry through the county during his Missouri raid of 1864.

Before the war Franklin County had been served by steamboats that moved freight and passenger traffic on the Missouri River. Afterwards, it became a railroad transportation center. Manufacturing industries were established at the end of the Civil War and successive ones have continued.

Bias Vineyard, near the small city of Berger, is located within the Hermann American Viticultural Area (AVA), designated in 1983. Röbller Vineyard and Winery near New Haven is also in the Hermann AVA. Wineries along both sides of the Missouri River are part of the Missouri Rhineland, whose vineyards were started by German immigrants in the mid-19th century. Before Prohibition, Missouri was the second-largest wine-producing state in the nation. Everything was closed down except for limited production of wine allowed for religious purposes. The state's wine industry had to be completely rebuilt, which has been taking place since the 1960s.

The rural county has had severe problems with local production, distribution and consumption of methamphetamine. The struggles of the county with adverse effects of the drug, was explored in a 2005 A&E documentary entitled Meth: A County in Crisis.

== Geography ==
According to the U.S. Census Bureau, the county has a total area of 931 square miles (2,410 km^{2}), of which 923 square miles (2,390 km^{2}) is land and 8.0 square miles (21 km^{2}) (0.9%) is water. It is the fourth-largest county in Missouri by land area and third-largest by total area.

The center of the Missouri River forms the nominal northern border of the county, although the river has changed its course since boundaries were first established: a portion of St. Charles County near St. Albans is now south of the river, while a portion of Franklin County near Augusta is north of the river.

The Bourbeuse River flows for 107 miles through the county. It cuts a deep, narrow valley and is very crooked. It empties into the Meramec River near Union. This river is mostly undeveloped, with limited access and few bridges over it. During low water, a number of fords allow crossing.

The county is located in the Ozarks region, with steep hills and deep valleys, caves, springs, and sinkholes characteristic of karst areas. The underlying rock is typically carbonate, including limestone and dolomite. Mining activity in the county included ores of lead, copper, zinc, and deposits of refractory clay. The soils in most of the county tend to be thin, rocky red clay, and are poor for most agriculture, while the soil near the Missouri River is dark, rich, and thick, and used primarily for row crops such as corn, wheat, and soybeans. Much of the county is covered with thick forests, reestablished since the 1920s.

Urbanization is increasing in the county, especially surrounding Washington and Union, and along Interstate 44. St. Albans is now a continuation of the suburban region of St. Louis County while the majority of the county retains a rural character and includes extensive wilderness areas, typical of exurban areas.

=== Adjacent counties ===
- Warren County (north)
- St. Charles County (northeast)
- St. Louis County (northeast)
- Jefferson County (east)
- Washington County (southeast)
- Crawford County (southwest)
- Gasconade County (west)

=== Major highways ===
- I-44
  - I-44 BL (Pacific)
- US 50
- Route 30
- Route 47
- Route 100
- Route 185

== Demographics ==
Historical population
Census	Pop.	Note	%±
1820	2,379		—
1830	3,484		46.4%
1840	7,515		115.7%
1850	11,021		46.7%
1860	18,085		64.1%
1870	30,098		66.4%
1880	26,534		−11.8%
1890	28,056		5.7%
1900	30,581		9.0%
1910	29,830		−2.5%
1920	28,427		−4.7%
1930	30,519		7.4%
1940	33,868		11.0%
1950	36,046		6.4%
1960	44,566		23.6%
1970	55,116		23.7%
1980	71,233		29.2%
1990	80,603		13.2%
2000	93,807		16.4%
2010	101,492		8.2%
2020	104,682		3.1%
2025 (est.)	108,090	▲	3.3%
U.S. Decennial Census; 1790–1960 1900–1990; 1990–2000 2010–2015 2020

=== 2020 census ===
Franklin County, Missouri – Racial and ethnic composition Note: the US Census treats Hispanic/Latino as an ethnic category. This table excludes Latinos from the racial categories and assigns them to a separate category. Hispanics/Latinos may be of any race.
Race / Ethnicity (NH = Non-Hispanic)	Pop 1980	Pop 1990	Pop 2000	Pop 2010	Pop 2020	% 1980	% 1990	% 2000	% 2010	% 2020
White alone (NH)	69,862	79,069	90,993	97,390	95,680	98.08%	98.10%	97.00%	95.96%	91.40%
Black or African American alone (NH)	696	737	880	847	880	0.98%	0.91%	0.94%	0.83%	0.84%
Native American or Alaska Native alone (NH)	122	145	212	290	291	0.17%	0.18%	0.23%	0.29%	0.28%
Asian alone (NH)	119	189	243	410	532	0.17%	0.23%	0.26%	0.40%	0.51%
Native Hawaiian or Pacific Islander alone (NH)	x	x	16	30	31	x	x	0.02%	0.03%	0.03%
Other race alone (NH)	34	22	38	63	283	0.05%	0.03%	0.04%	0.06%	0.27%
Mixed race or Multiracial (NH)	x	x	747	1,065	4,780	x	x	0.80%	1.05%	4.57%
Hispanic or Latino (any race)	400	441	678	1,397	2,205	0.56%	0.55%	0.72%	1.38%	2.11%
Total	71,233	80,603	93,807	101,492	104,682	100.00%	100.00%	100.00%	100.00%	100.00%

As of the 2020 census, the county had a population of 104,682. The median age was 41.7 years. 22.5% of residents were under the age of 18 and 18.6% of residents were 65 years of age or older. For every 100 females there were 98.8 males, and for every 100 females age 18 and over there were 97.0 males age 18 and over.

The racial makeup of the county was 92.1% White, 0.9% Black or African American, 0.3% American Indian and Alaska Native, 0.5% Asian, 0.0% Native Hawaiian and Pacific Islander, 0.8% from some other race, and 5.4% from two or more races. Hispanic or Latino residents of any race comprised 2.1% of the population.

45.0% of residents lived in urban areas, while 55.0% lived in rural areas.

There were 41,476 households in the county, of which 29.4% had children under the age of 18 living with them and 22.8% had a female householder with no spouse or partner present. About 26.1% of all households were made up of individuals and 11.5% had someone living alone who was 65 years of age or older.

There were 45,275 housing units, of which 8.4% were vacant. Among occupied housing units, 73.6% were owner-occupied and 26.4% were renter-occupied. The homeowner vacancy rate was 1.6% and the rental vacancy rate was 7.6%.

=== 2000 census ===
As of the census of 2000, there were 93,807 people, 34,945 households, and 25,684 families residing in the county. The population density was 102 inhabitants per square mile (39/km^{2}). There were 38,295 housing units at an average density of 42 units per square mile (16/km^{2}). The racial makeup of the county was 97.47% White, 0.94% Black or African American, 0.27% Asian, 0.24% Native American, 0.02% Pacific Islander, 0.20% from other races, and 0.86% from two or more races. Approximately 0.72% of the population were Hispanic or Latino of any race. 44.9% were of German, 13.0% American, 10.7% Irish and 7.7% English ancestry.

There were 34,945 households, out of which 36.10% had children under the age of 18 living with them, 60.40% were married couples living together, 9.00% had a female householder with no husband present, and 26.50% were non-families. 22.10% of all households were made up of individuals, and 8.90% had someone living alone who was 65 years of age or older. The average household size was 2.66 and the average family size was 3.11.

In the county, the population was spread out, with 27.40% under the age of 18, 8.20% from 18 to 24, 30.00% from 25 to 44, 22.40% from 45 to 64, and 12.10% who were 65 years of age or older. The median age was 36 years. For every 100 females there were 98.50 males. For every 100 females age 18 and over, there were 95.80 males.

The median income for a household in the county was $54,392, and the median income for a family was $62,969. Males had a median income of $35,849 versus $23,344 for females. The per capita income for the county was $24,529. About 4.50% of families and 7.00% of the population were below the poverty line, including 7.90% of those under age 18 and 8.80% of those age 65 or over.

== Economy ==
The unemployment rate in Franklin County is 2.9% as of December 2018, below state and national averages.

Manufacturing accounts for the most (23.8%) employment in Franklin County, primarily in the cities of Washington and Union, followed by trade, transportation and utilities (18.8%), education and health care (17.7%), and construction (11.3%).

The biggest employers in Franklin County are the manufacturing firms of Magnet LLC, Cardinal Brands Hazel Division, GDX Automotive, Sporlan Valve Company, Esselte, Silgan, Buddeez, and Meramec Group Inc. as well as the Meramec Valley R-III School District in the public education sector and Schatz Underground Cable Inc. in the construction industry. Small farms and wineries also greatly contribute to the economy in Franklin County.

== Education ==
The highest educational attainment in Franklin County consists of the following:

- High School Graduates: 59.1%
- Associate Degree: 10.6%
- Bachelor's Degree: 10.9%
- Graduate Degree: 7.5%

=== School districts ===
School districts in the county:

K-12

- Crawford County R-I School District
- Gasconade County R-I School District
- Gasconade County R-II School District
- Meramec Valley School District
- New Haven School District
- St. Clair R-XIII School District
- Sullivan C-2 School District
- Union R-XI School District
- Washington School District

Elementary:

- Franklin County R-II School District
- Lonedell R-XIV School District
- Richwoods R-VII School District
- Spring Bluff R-XV School District
- Strain-Japan R-XVI School District

=== Public schools ===
- New Haven Public School District - New Haven
  - New Haven Elementary School (K–6)
  - New Haven Middle School (7–8)
  - New Haven High School (9–12)
- Meramec Valley School District – Pacific
  - Meramec Valley Community School (Pre-K) – Pacific
  - Meramec Valley Early Childhood Center (Pre-K) – Pacific
  - Truman Elementary School (K–5) – Pacific
  - Robertsville Elementary School (K–5) – Robertsville
  - Zitzman Elementary School (K–5) – Pacific
  - Nike Elementary School (K–5) – Catawissa
  - Coleman Elementary School (K–5) – Villa Ridge
  - Riverbend School (8) – Pacific
  - Meramec Valley Middle School (6–7) – Pacific
  - Pacific High School (9–12) – Pacific
- St. Clair R-XIII School District – St. Clair
  - St. Clair Elementary School (K–2)
  - Edgar Murray Elementary School (3–5)
  - St. Clair Jr. High School (6–8)
  - St. Clair High School (9–12)
- – Spring Bluff School District–Spring Bluff
  - Spring Bluff R-XV (k-8)
- Sullivan School District – Sullivan
  - Sullivan Primary School (Pre-K–1)
  - Sullivan Elementary School (2–5)
  - Sullivan Middle School (6–8)
  - Sullivan High School (9–12)
- Union R-XI School District – Union
  - Beaufort Elementary School (K–6) – Beaufort
  - Central Elementary School (K–3) – Union
  - Clark-Vitt Elementary School (4–6) – Union
  - Union Middle School (7–8) – Union
  - Union High School (9–12) – Union
- School District of Washington – Washington
  - Family Resource Center (Pre-K) – Washington
  - Washington West Elementary School (Pre-K–6) – Washington
  - South Point Elementary School (K–6) – Washington
  - Marthasville Elementary School (K–6) – Marthasville
  - Labadie Elementary School (K–6) – Labadie
  - Clearview Elementary School (Pre-K–6) – Union
  - Campbellton Elementary School (K–6) – New Haven
  - Augusta Elementary School (Pre-K–06) – Augusta
  - Washington Middle School (7–8) – Washington
  - Washington High School (9–12) – Washington
- Franklin County R-II School District – New Haven
  - Franklin County Elementary School (K–8) – New Haven
- Lonedell R-XIV School District – Lonedell
  - Lonedell Elementary School (K–8) – Lonedell
- Owensville R-II School District – Gerald
  - Gerald Elementary School (K–5) – Gerald
- Strain-Japan R-XVI School District - Sullivan
  - Strain-Japan Elementary School (K-08) - Sullivan

=== Private schools ===
- Cornerstone Christian Academy – St. Clair – (1–12) – Other Affiliation
- Crosspoint Christian School – Villa Ridge – (K–12) – Nondenominational Christianity
- Immanuel Lutheran School – Washington – (K–8) – Lutheran
- St. Francis Borgia High School – Washington – (9–12) – Roman Catholic
- St. John the Baptist School – Villa Ridge – (Pre-K–8) – Roman Catholic
- St. Gertrude School – Kraków – (K–8) – Roman Catholic
- St. Francis Borgia Grade School – Washington – (Pre-K–8) – Roman Catholic
- Our Lady of Lourdes – Washington – (Pre-K–8) – Roman Catholic
- St. Clare Catholic Grade School – St. Clair – (Pre-K–8) – Roman Catholic
- St. Bridget of Kildare School – Pacific – (Pre-K–8) – Roman Catholic

=== Alternative schools ===
- Autumn Hill State School (K–12) – Union – Handicapped/Special needs
- Franklin County Special Education Cooperative (Pre-K–12) – St. Clair – Special Education
- Four Rivers Career Center (9–12) – Washington – Vocational/Technical

=== Colleges/universities ===
- East Central College – Union

=== Public libraries ===
- Gerald Area Library
- Scenic Regional Library
- Sullivan Public Library
- Washington Public Library

== Crime ==
Rural Franklin County has had problems with the local production and consumption of methamphetamine and was featured in an A&E documentary entitled Meth: A County in Crisis (2005).

The Drug Enforcement Administration and the Multi-County Narcotics and Violent Crimes Enforcement Unit have investigated methamphetamine distribution cases in the county.

== Politics ==
As of July 2022, according to the new congressional map based on the 2020 U.S. Census passed by the Missouri General Assembly and signed into law by Governor Mike Parson, all of Franklin County will be moved from Missouri's 3rd Congressional District to Missouri's 2nd Congressional District, with the new district boundaries taking effect on January 3, 2023, from the results of the November 2022 general elections.

=== Local ===
The Republican Party predominantly controls politics at the local level in Franklin County. Republicans currently hold all but one of the elected positions in the county.

Franklin County, Missouri

Elected countywide officials
Assessor	Dawn Mentz	Republican
Auditor	Angela Gibson	Republican
Circuit Clerk	Connie Ward	Republican
County Clerk	Tim Baker	Republican
Collector	Doug Trentmann	Republican
Commissioner (presiding)	Tim Brinker	Republican
Commissioner (district 1)	Todd Boland	Republican
Commissioner (district 2)	Dave Hinson	Republican
Prosecuting Attorney	Matthew Becker	Republican
Public Administrator	Mary Jo Straatmann	Democratic
Recorder	Lisa Smart	Republican
Sheriff	Steve Pelton	Republican
Treasurer	Debbie Aholt	Republican

=== State ===
Past Gubernatorial Elections Results
Year	Republican	Democratic	Third Parties
2024	72.37% 39,500	25.28% 13,800	2.35% 1,279
2020	69.54% 37,136	28.01% 14,957	2.39% 1,277
2016	55.99% 28,069	41.61% 18,756	6.60% 3,306
2012	48.08% 22,335	49.23% 22,869	2.69% 1,252
2008	46.82% 22,896	51.29% 25,082	1.89% 921
2004	56.33% 25,557	42.31% 19,195	1.36% 617
2000	54.75% 21,336	41.61% 16,216	3.64% 1,418
1996	46.18% 15,540	50.44% 16,973	3.38% 1,137

Franklin County is divided into four legislative districts in the Missouri House of Representatives, all of which are held by Republicans.

- District 61 — Aaron Griesheimer (R-Washington). Consists of Berger, Gerald, Leslie, New Haven, and part of Washington.

Missouri House of Representatives — District 61 — Franklin County (2020)
Party	Candidate	Votes	%	±%
Republican	Aaron Griesheimer	11,649	98.10%	

Missouri House of Representatives — District 61 — Franklin County (2018)
Party	Candidate	Votes	%	±%
Republican	Aaron Griesheimer	7,566	68.48%	
Democratic	Pamela Menefee	3,470	31.41%	

Missouri House of Representatives — District 61 — Franklin County (2016)
Party	Candidate	Votes	%	±%
Republican	Justin Alferman	9,575	75.43%	+3.05
Democratic	Tom Smith	3,119	24.57%	−3.05

Missouri House of Representatives — District 61 — Franklin County (2014)
Party	Candidate	Votes	%	±%
Republican	Justin Alferman	5,109	72.38%	−0.10
Democratic	Tom Smith	1,950	27.62%	+0.10

Missouri House of Representatives — District 61 — Franklin County (2012)
Party	Candidate	Votes	%	±%
Republican	Dave Schatz	8,446	72.48%	
Democratic	Michael Sage	3,207	27.52%	

- District 109 — John Simmons (R-Washington). Consists of Gray Summit, Union, Villa Ridge, and part of Washington.

Missouri House of Representatives — District 109 — Franklin County (2020)
Party	Candidate	Votes	%	±%
Republican	John Simmons	14,164	97.69%	

Missouri House of Representatives — District 109 — Franklin County (2018)
Party	Candidate	Votes	%	±%
Republican	John Simmons	10,453	66.78%	
Democratic	James Cordrey	5,180	33.09%	

Missouri House of Representatives — District 109 — Franklin County (2016)
Party	Candidate	Votes	%	±%
Republican	Paul Curtman	14,164	81.10%	+9.71
Green	Ellen Skiljan	3,301	19.90%	+19.90

Missouri House of Representatives — District 109 — Franklin County (2014)
Party	Candidate	Votes	%	±%
Republican	Paul Curtman	6,720	71.39%	+13.77
Democratic	Barbara Bollmann	2,693	28.61%	−13.77

Missouri House of Representatives — District 109 — Franklin County (2012)
Party	Candidate	Votes	%	±%
Republican	Paul Curtman	9,810	57.62%	
Democratic	Ann Schroeder	7,215	42.38%	

- District 110 — Dottie Bailey (R-Eureka). Consists of the city of Pacific.

Missouri House of Representatives — District 110 — Franklin County (2020)
Party	Candidate	Votes	%	±%
Republican	Dottie Bailey	2,275	64.58%	
Democratic	John Kiehne	1,237	35.11%	

Missouri House of Representatives — District 110 — Franklin County (2018)
Party	Candidate	Votes	%	±%
Republican	Dottie Bailey	1,558	53.80%	
Democratic	Cody Kelley	1,337	46.17%	

Missouri House of Representatives — District 110 — Franklin County (2016)
Party	Candidate	Votes	%	±%
Republican	Kirk Matthews	2,801	100.00%	

Missouri House of Representatives — District 110 — Franklin County (2014)
Party	Candidate	Votes	%	±%
Republican	Kirk Mattews	1,284	100.00%	

Missouri House of Representatives — District 110 — Franklin County (2012)
Party	Candidate	Votes	%	±%
Republican	Timothy W. Jones	2,559	100.00%	

- District 119 — Nate Tate (R-St. Clair). Consists of Oak Grove Village, Parkway, St. Clair, and Sullivan.

Missouri House of Representatives — District 119 — Franklin County (2020)
Party	Candidate	Votes	%	±%
Republican	Nate Tate	13,679	97.87%	

Missouri House of Representatives — District 119 — Franklin County (2018)
Party	Candidate	Votes	%	±%
Republican	Nate Tate	8,834	70.80%	
Democratic	Marcie Nichols	3,622	29.03%	

Missouri House of Representatives — District 119 — Franklin County (2016)
Party	Candidate	Votes	%	±%
Republican	Nate Tate	12,950	100.00%	+31.56

Missouri House of Representatives — District 119 — Franklin County (2014)
Party	Candidate	Votes	%	±%
Republican	Dave Hinson	5,152	68.44%	−31.56
Democratic	Susan Cunningham	2,376	31.56%	+31.56

Missouri House of Representatives — District 119 — Franklin County (2012)
Party	Candidate	Votes	%	±%
Republican	Dave Hinson	11,880	100.00%	

All of Franklin County is a part of Missouri's 26th District in the Missouri Senate and is represented by Dave Schatz (R-Sullivan).

Missouri Senate — District 26 — Franklin County (2018)
Party	Candidate	Votes	%	±%
Republican	Dave Schatz	27,875	66.10%	
Democratic	John Kiehne	14,242	33.77%	

Missouri Senate — District 26 — Franklin County (2014)
Party	Candidate	Votes	%	±%
Republican	Dave Schatz	18,752	73.64%	
Democratic	Lloyd Klinedinst	6,714	26.36%	

=== Federal ===
U.S. Senate — Missouri — Franklin County (2018)
Party	Candidate	Votes	%	±%
Republican	Josh Hawley	25,651	59.69%	
Democratic	Claire McCaskill	15,642	36.40%	
Independent	Craig O'Dear	826	1.92%	
Libertarian	Japheth Campbell	551	1.28%	
Green	Jo Crain	261	0.61%	

U.S. Senate — Missouri — Franklin County (2016)
Party	Candidate	Votes	%	±%
Republican	Roy Blunt	28,258	56.57%	+10.59
Democratic	Jason Kander	19,102	38.24%	−8.92
Libertarian	Jonathan Dine	1,417	2.84%	−4.02
Green	Jonathan McFarland	670	1.34%	+1.34
Constitution	Fred Ryman	505	1.01%	+1.01

U.S. Senate — Missouri — Franklin County (2012)
Party	Candidate	Votes	%	±%
Republican	Todd Akin	21,281	45.98%	
Democratic	Claire McCaskill	21,826	47.16%	
Libertarian	Jonathan Dine	3,178	6.86%	

All of Franklin is included in the 3rd Congressional District, represented by Blaine Luetkemeyer (R-St. Elizabeth) in the U.S. House of Representatives.

U.S. House of Representatives — District 3 — Franklin County (2020)
Party	Candidate	Votes	%	±%
Republican	Blaine Luetkemeyer	38,283	73.03%	
Democratic	Megan Rezabek	13,032	24.86%	
Libertarian	Leonard Steinman II	1,062	2.03%	

U.S. House of Representatives — District 3 — Franklin County (2018)
Party	Candidate	Votes	%	±%
Republican	Blaine Luetkemeyer	28,707	67.64%	
Democratic	Kathy Geppert	12,847	30.27%	
Libertarian	Donald Stolle	858	2.02%	

U.S. House of Representatives — District 3 — Franklin County (2016)
Party	Candidate	Votes	%	±%
Republican	Blaine Luetkemeyer	34,308	70.23%	+0.71
Democratic	Kevin Miller	12,279	25.14%	−0.20
Libertarian	Dan Hogan	1,811	3.71%	−1.24
Constitution	Doanita Simmons	449	0.92%	+0.92

U.S. House of Representatives — District 3 — Franklin County (2014)
Party	Candidate	Votes	%	±%
Republican	Blaine Luetkemeyer	17,797	69.52%	+3.76
Democratic	Courtney Denton	6,487	25.34%	−5.18
Libertarian	Steven Hedrick	1,268	4.95%	+1.23
Write-In	Harold Davis	48	0.19%	+0.19

U.S. House of Representatives — District 3 — Franklin County (2012)
Party	Candidate	Votes	%	±%
Republican	Blaine Luetkemeyer	29,777	65.76%	
Democratic	Eric Mayer	13,818	30.52%	
Libertarian	Steven Wilson	1,685	3.72%	

==== Political culture ====
United States presidential election results for Franklin County, Missouri
Year	Republican		Democratic		Third party(ies)	
Year	No.	%	No.	%	No.	%
1888	3,261	55.45%	2,579	43.85%	41	0.70%
1892	2,987	52.38%	2,498	43.80%	218	3.82%
1896	3,797	56.46%	2,904	43.18%	24	0.36%
1900	3,686	57.49%	2,652	41.37%	73	1.14%
1904	3,738	60.90%	2,278	37.11%	122	1.99%
1908	4,049	60.91%	2,423	36.45%	175	2.63%
1912	2,424	43.32%	2,239	40.02%	932	16.66%
1916	4,325	62.36%	2,468	35.59%	142	2.05%
1920	8,712	74.25%	2,814	23.98%	207	1.76%
1924	6,253	59.31%	3,384	32.10%	906	8.59%
1928	7,831	58.92%	5,429	40.84%	32	0.24%
1932	5,369	38.37%	8,479	60.60%	144	1.03%
1936	7,708	48.42%	7,565	47.52%	647	4.06%
1940	10,283	58.58%	7,237	41.22%	35	0.20%
1944	9,325	60.84%	5,958	38.88%	43	0.28%
1948	7,725	49.57%	7,822	50.19%	38	0.24%
1952	11,367	56.82%	8,610	43.04%	27	0.13%
1956	11,605	58.04%	8,391	41.96%	0	0.00%
1960	11,610	52.93%	10,324	47.07%	0	0.00%
1964	8,313	38.17%	13,464	61.83%	0	0.00%
1968	9,823	50.77%	7,566	39.10%	1,960	10.13%
1972	13,785	64.87%	7,464	35.13%	0	0.00%
1976	12,242	50.29%	11,695	48.04%	405	1.66%
1980	15,210	56.69%	10,480	39.06%	1,142	4.26%
1984	18,669	69.18%	8,319	30.82%	0	0.00%
1988	16,611	58.06%	11,891	41.56%	108	0.38%
1992	11,477	31.82%	13,431	37.24%	11,156	30.93%
1996	13,715	40.66%	13,908	41.23%	6,111	18.12%
2000	21,863	55.78%	16,172	41.26%	1,159	2.96%
2004	26,429	58.32%	18,556	40.95%	333	0.73%
2008	27,355	55.31%	21,256	42.98%	847	1.71%
2012	29,396	62.64%	16,347	34.83%	1,186	2.53%
2016	35,430	70.20%	12,341	24.45%	2,701	5.35%
2020	38,058	70.89%	14,569	27.14%	1,058	1.97%
2024	40,126	72.35%	14,694	26.49%	644	1.16%

At the presidential level, Franklin County is fairly independent-leaning, but, like many exurban and mostly rural counties, its voters often favor Republican and conservative issues. While southerner Bill Clinton narrowly carried the county both times in 1992 and 1996, George W. Bush strongly carried Franklin County in 2000 and 2004. Like many of the rural counties in Missouri, Franklin County favored John McCain over Barack Obama in 2008.

Like most predominantly rural areas, voters in Franklin County generally strongly support socially and culturally conservative principles and therefore tend to support Republican candidates. In 2004, Missourians voted on a constitutional amendment to define marriage as the union between a man and a woman; the measure overwhelmingly passed Franklin County with 76.89 percent of the vote. The initiative passed the state with 71 percent of support from voters as Missouri became the first state to ban same-sex marriage.

In 2006, Missourians voted on a constitutional amendment to fund and legalize embryonic stem cell research in the state; it failed in Franklin County with 56.13 percent voting against the measure. The initiative narrowly passed the state with 51 percent of support from voters as Missouri became one of the first states in the nation to approve embryonic stem cell research.

Despite Franklin County's longstanding tradition of supporting socially conservative platforms, voters have advanced some populist causes such as increasing the minimum wage. In 2006, Missourians voted on a proposition (Proposition B) to increase the minimum wage in the state to $6.50 an hour; it passed Franklin County with 77.61 percent of the vote. The proposition strongly passed every single county in Missouri with 75.94 percent voting in favor as the minimum wage was increased to $6.50 an hour in the state. During the same election, voters in five other states also strongly approved increases in the minimum wage.

2020 Missouri Presidential primary

Republican

President Donald Trump won Franklin County with 97.35 percent of the vote; all other Republican candidates received less than 1 percent of the vote.

Democratic

Forty-seventh Vice President Joe Biden won Franklin County with 59 percent of the vote; U.S. Senator Bernie Sanders (I-Vermont) came in second with 35.03 percent.

==== 2016 Missouri Presidential primary ====
Republican

Donald Trump won Franklin County with 44.49 percent of the vote; U.S. Senator Ted Cruz (R-Texas) came in second with 39.77 percent, Governor John Kasich (R-Ohio) came in distant third with 7.65 percent, and U.S. Senator Marco Rubio (R-Florida) came in fourth with 5.63 percent.

Democratic

U.S. Senator Bernie Sanders (I-Vermont) won Franklin County with 55.41 percent of the vote while former Secretary of State Hillary Clinton came in second with 42.89 percent.

==== 2012 Missouri Presidential primary ====
Republican

Former U.S. Senator Rick Santorum (R-Pennsylvania) won Franklin County with 60.12 percent of the vote. Former Governor Mitt Romney (R-Massachusetts) came in a distant second place with 21.1 percent, and former U.S. Representative Ron Paul (R-Texas) came in third with 12.36 percent.

Democratic

With no serious contest for incumbent President Barack Obama, only 1,080 Franklin County voters chose to participate in the Democratic primary, and Obama won 81.11 percent.

==== 2008 Missouri Presidential primary ====
Republican

U.S. Senator John McCain (R-Arizona) won Franklin County with 35.68 percent of the vote. Former Governor Mitt Romney (R-Massachusetts) came in a close second place with 30.51 percent while former Governor Mike Huckabee (R-Arkansas) finished third with 27.70 percent. Libertarian-leaning U.S. Representative Ron Paul (R-Texas) finished a distant fourth with 4.07 percent.

Democratic

Then-U.S. Senator Hillary Clinton (D-New York) carried Franklin County with 55.83 percent of the vote. Then-U.S. Senator Barack Obama (D-Illinois) received 40.28 percent of the vote from Franklin County Democrats, one of his more impressive showings in a predominantly rural albeit exurban county. Although he withdrew from the race, former U.S. Senator John Edwards (D-North Carolina) still received 2.96 percent of the vote in Franklin County.

- Despite being a strongly Republican county, Hillary Rodham Clinton received more votes, a total of 7,177, than any candidate from either party in Franklin County during the 2008 presidential primary. Barack Obama received 5,179 in the Missouri Democratic Primary. Both Democratic candidates each received more votes than John McCain in the Republican Primary in Franklin County, who received 4,032 votes.

COVID-19 controversy

During the 2020 COVID-19 pandemic, Angie Hittson, the director of the Franklin County Public Health Department described being driven to resign from her position by residents who made "daily verbal assaults, threats of violence, and even death threats" against her and her family due to the public-health orders made in response to the pandemic.

== Communities ==
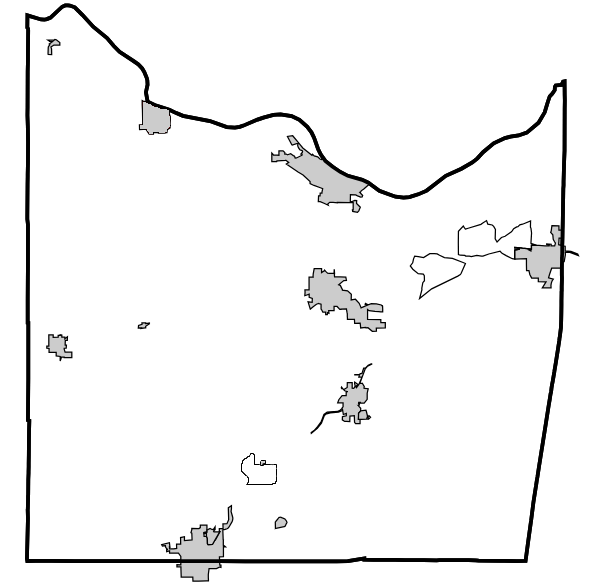
Communities in Franklin County, Missouri

=== Cities ===
- Berger
- Gerald
- St. Clair
- New Haven
- Pacific (small part in St. Louis County)
- Sullivan (partial)
- Union (county seat)
- Washington

=== Villages ===
- Charmwood
- Leslie
- Miramiguoa Park
- Oak Grove Village
- Parkway

=== Census-designated places ===
- Gray Summit
- Lake St. Clair
- Stanton
- Villa Ridge

=== Unincorporated communities ===
- Anaconda
- Beaufort
- Beemont
- Boles
- Campbellton
- Catawissa
- Champion City
- Clover Bottom
- Dissen
- Dundee
- Elmont
- Etlah
- Fourmile Corner
- Gildehouse
- Hemker
- Huff
- Jaegers Shop
- Japan
- Jeffriesburg
- Kiel
- Kohl City
- Krakow
- Labadie
- Lonedell
- Luebbering
- Lyon
- Maupin
- Monday
- Moselle
- Mount Hope
- Neier
- Newport
- Noser Mill
- Oetters
- Port Hudson
- Robertsville
- Spring Bluff
- St. Albans
- Strain

=== Townships ===
- Boeuf Township
- Boles Township
- Boone Township
- Calvey Township
- Central Township
- Lyon Township
- Meramec Township
- New Haven Township
- Prairie Township
- St. Johns Township
- Union Township
- Washington Township

== See also ==
- List of counties in Missouri
- National Register of Historic Places listings in Franklin County, Missouri
