= Boeuf Township, Franklin County, Missouri =

Township in Franklin County, Missouri

Coordinates: 38.6108°N 91.2689°W

Boeuf Township is an inactive township in Franklin County, in the U.S. state of Missouri.

== Geography ==
=== Major highways ===
- MO-100
- MO-185

=== Adjacent Townships ===
- Lyon Township
- St. Johns Township
- New Haven Township
- Beouf Township (Gasconade County)
- Roark Township

== History ==
Boeuf Township was established in 1819, taking its name from Boeuf Creek. In 1873 New Haven split into its own city township.

== Communities ==
=== Cities ===
- Berger
- New Haven(1819–1873)

=== Unincorporated communities ===
- Etlah
- Kohl City (Kohl)
- Dissen
- Dundee
