= List of African-American historic places in Missouri =

This list of African American Historic Places in Missouri is based on a book by the National Park Service, The Preservation Press, the National Trust for Historic Preservation, and the National Conference of State Historic Preservation Officers.

For National List of African American Historic Places use this link.

Contents: Counties in Missouri with African American Historic Places
Boone - Cooper - Franklin - Jackson - Lewis - Marion - Newton - St. Louis - Saline

Some of these sites are on the National Register of Historic Places (NR) as independent sites or as part of larger historic district. Several of the sites are National Historic Landmarks (NRL). Others have Missouri historical markers (HM). The citation on historical markers is given in the reference. The location listed is the nearest community to the site. More precise locations are given in the reference.

== Boone County ==
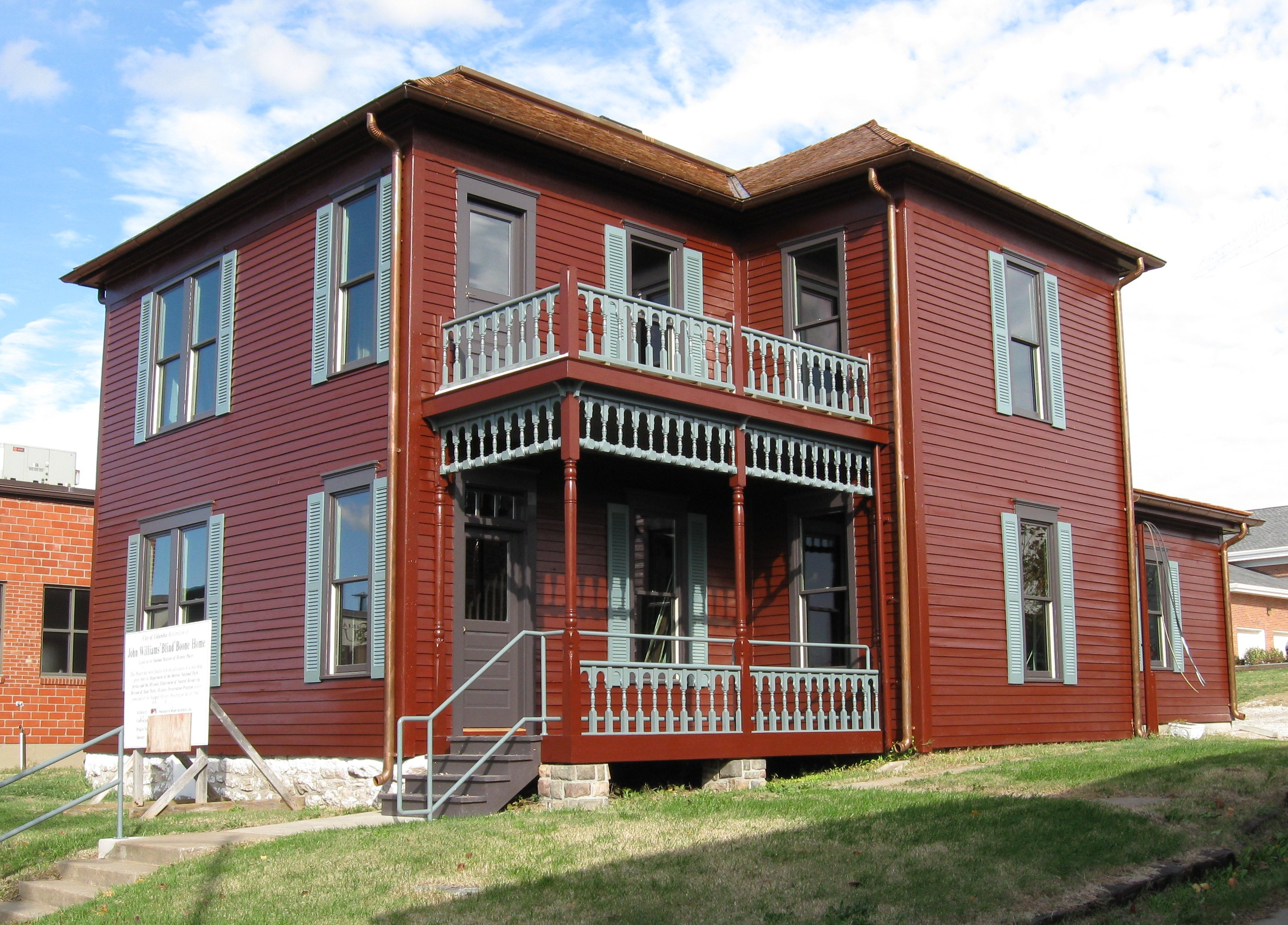
The JW 'Blind' Boone house.

- Columbia
  - Frederick Douglass High School,
  - John W. Boone House,
  - St. Paul AME Church,
  - Second Baptist Church,
  - Second Christian Church,

== Cooper County ==
- Boonville
  - St. Matthew's Chapel AME Church
  - Sumner Public School

== Franklin County ==
- New Haven
  - AME Church of New Haven
  - St. Charles African Church

== Jackson County ==
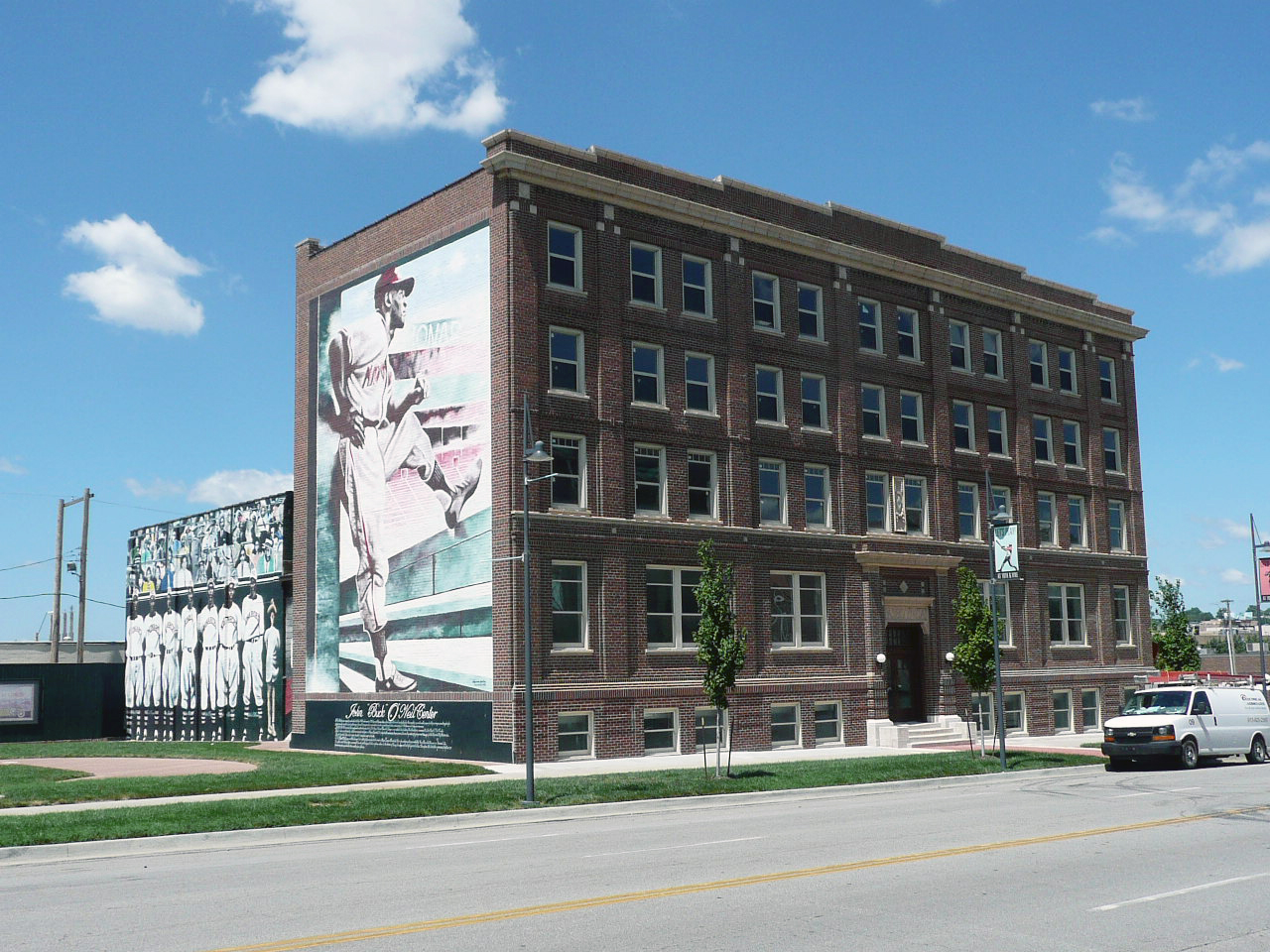
The Paseo YMCA

- Kansas City
  - 18th and Vine Historic District
  - Attucks School
  - Paseo YMCA
  - Santa Fe Place Historic District
  - Negro Leagues Baseball Museum

== Lewis County ==
- Canton
  - Lincoln School
- Jefferson City
  - Jefferson City Community Center
  - Lincoln Univ. Hilltop Campus Historic District

== Marion County ==
- Hannibal
  - Eighth and Center Streets Baptist Church

== Newton County ==
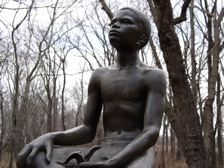
George Washington Carver

- Diamond
  - George Washington Carver National Monument

== City of St. Louis ==
- St. Louis
  - Charles Sumner High School
  - First African Baptist Church (St. Louis, Missouri)
  - Gateway Arch National Park
  - Homer G. Phillips Hospital
  - Mary Meachum Freedom Crossing
  - Mutual Musicians' Foundation Building
  - Negro Masonic Hall
  - Quinn Chapel AME Church
  - Scott Joplin House
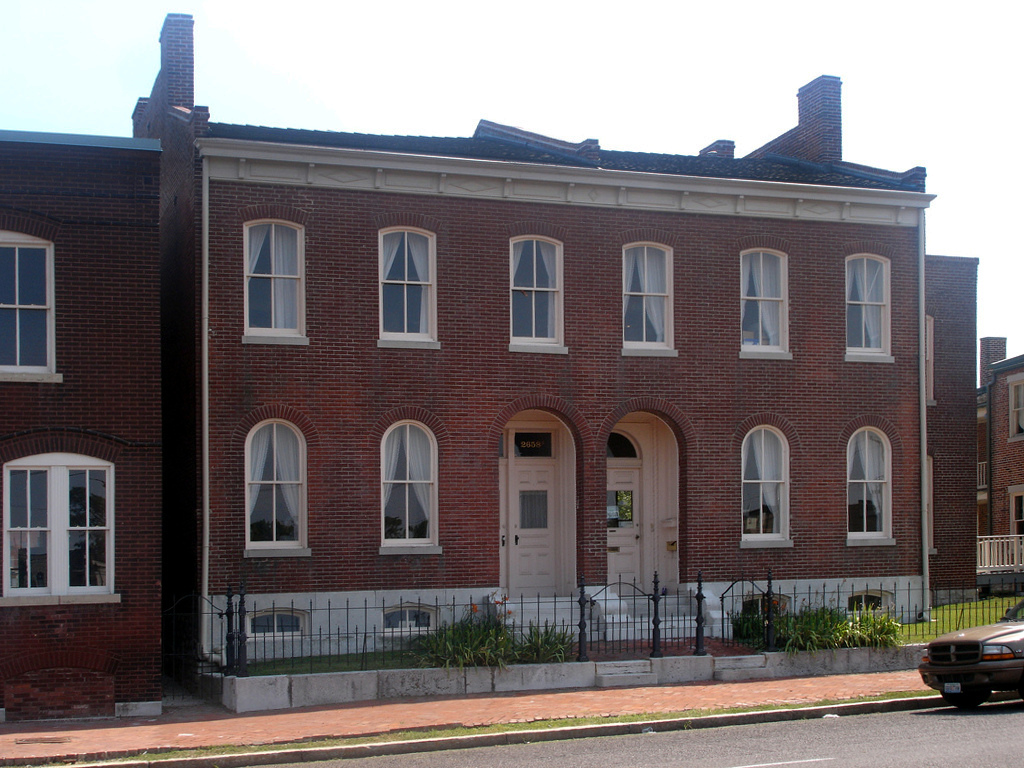
    Scott Joplin House, 2658A Delmar Boulevard, St Louis, Missouri
  - Shelley House
  - Washington Park Cemetery

== Saline County ==
- Marshall
  - Free Will Baptist Church of Pennytown,
