= Boeuf =

Boeuf or Bœuf may refer to:

== Places in the United States ==
- Boeuf River, Arkansas
- Boeuf Township, Franklin County, Missouri
- Boeuf Township, Gasconade County, Missouri
- Boeuf Creek, Missouri
- Boeuf Wildlife Management Area, Louisiana

== Surname ==
- Alexis Bœuf (born 1986), French biathlete
- Alfonso Peña Boeuf (1888–1966), Spanish civil engineer and Minister of Public Works under Franco
- Dominique Boeuf (born 1968), French jockey
- Georges Bœuf (1937–2020), French composer, musician, and saxophonist
- Gilles Boeuf (born 1950), French biologist
- Marc Boeuf (1934—1993), French politician

== Other uses ==
- Rue du Bœuf, a street in Lyon, France

== See also ==
- LeBoeuf (disambiguation)
