= Campbellton, Missouri =

Unincorporated community in Missouri, US

Coordinates: 38°32′24″N 91°09′39″W

Campbellton is an unincorporated community in northern Franklin County, in the U.S. state of Missouri. The community lies on Missouri Route 185 between Lyon to the southwest and Dundee to the northeast. Campbellton School is approximately 1.5 miles northeast on Route 185. Boeuf Creek drains the area to the north and the small stream, Slaughter Branch, flows past the village to the south.

== History ==
A post office called Campbellton was established in 1854, and remained in operation until 1907. The community was named in honor of James Campbell (1812–1893), US postmaster general.
