= Bucklick Creek =

Stream in the American state of Missouri

Bucklick Creek (also called Brush Lick Creek) is a stream in northwest Franklin County in the U.S. state of Missouri. It is a tributary of Boeuf Creek.

The stream headwaters arise at 38°30′20″N 91°12′36″W approximately two miles southeast of Kiel and just north of Missouri Route YY. The stream flows north for approximately five miles and passes under Missouri Route KK to its confluence with Boeuf Creek two miles southeast of New Haven. The confluence is at 38°34′57″N 91°12′03″W.

Bucklick Creek was named for a mineral lick where male deer (bucks) were observed.

== See also ==
- List of rivers of Missouri
