= LeBoeuf =

LeBoeuf, Le Boeuf, LeBœuf or Le Bœuf may refer to:

== People ==
- Adria LeBoeuf (born 1982), American evolutionary biologist and neuroscientist
- Al LeBoeuf (born 1960), American baseball coach
- David LeBoeuf (born 1989), American politician
- Edmond Le Bœuf (1809–1888), French general, Marshal of France
- Frank Leboeuf (born 1968), French footballer, actor, and sports commentator
- Henry Le Bœuf (1874–1935), Belgian banker, patron of the arts, and music lover
- Laurence Leboeuf (born 1985), Canadian actress
- Michael LeBoeuf, American business author and management professor
- Remy Le Boeuf (born 1986), American jazz saxophonist, composer, and multi-instrumentalist
- Shia LaBeouf (born 1986), American actor, performance artist, and filmmaker

== Places in the United States ==
- LeBoeuf Township, Erie County, Pennsylvania
- Fort Le Boeuf, a fort that was located near present-day Waterford, Pennsylvania
- Lake LeBoeuf, a lake in Pennsylvania, United States
- Leboeuf Creek (Missouri), a tributary of the Gasconade River
- LeBoeuf Creek (Pennsylvania), a tributary of French Creek

== Other uses ==
- Le Boeuf Brothers, a modern jazz group
- LeBoeuf, Lamb, Greene & MacRae, a law firm

== See also ==
- Boeuf (disambiguation), also Bœuf
