= Miller's Landing =

Miller's Landing may refer to:

- Original name of New Haven, Missouri
- Miller's Landing, an early settlement in Homer, Alaska
