= Missouri Route 185 =

State highway in Missouri, U.S.

Route 185
- MO 185; mainline in red, spur route in blue

Route information
- Maintained by MoDOT
- Length: 66.127 mi (106.421 km)

Major junctions
- South end: Route 8 in Potosi
- Historic US 66 / Route 185 Spur in Sullivan; US 50 in Beaufort
- North end: Route 100 north of Campbellton

Location
- Country: United States
- State: Missouri

Highway system
- Missouri State Highway System; Interstate; US; State; Supplemental
← Route 181	→ Route 187

Route 185 is a highway in eastern Missouri. Its northern terminus is at Route 100 west of Washington; its southern terminus is at Route 8 in Potosi. A spur of Highway 185 goes into Meramec State Park, Miramiguoa Park, and Meramec Conservation Area.

== Major intersections ==
County	Location	mi	km	Destinations	Notes
Washington	Potosi	0.000	0.000	Route 8 – Leadwood, Steelville	
Franklin	Sullivan	31.697	51.011	Route 185 Spur north – Meramec State Park	
Franklin	Sullivan	33.367	53.699	Historic US 66 east / Route AF to I-44	Southern end of Historic US 66 overlap
Franklin	Sullivan	35.033	56.380	Historic US 66 west / Route D to I-44	Northern end of Historic US 66 overlap
Franklin	Beaufort	52.734	84.867	US 50 – Gerald, Union	
Franklin	Boeuf Township	66.127	106.421	Route 100 – New Haven, Washington	
1.000 mi = 1.609 km; 1.000 km = 0.621 mi: Concurrency terminus

== Related route ==
Route 185 Spur
- Location: Meramec State Park
- Length: 2.211 mi (3.558 km)

Route 185 Spur is a two-mile-long (3.2 km), winding road that leads into Miramiguoa Park on the east side of Sullivan.
