= Jennie Spindler Walsh =

Jennie Spindler Walsh (1890 – ?) was a teacher and state legislator in Missouri. She was a Democrat.

She was born in Sullivan, Missouri. She attended Steeleville Normal and Business Institute.and St. Louis Academy of Beauty Culture. She married Michael L. Walsh. She worked for a time as a teacher, and then "entered the beauty profession and owned and operated a beauty shop for twenty-five years".

Her address was listed as 4374 Laclede Avenue. In August 1956, it was reported that nine people were registered to vote at that address, a larger number than those actually living there.

She was noted as ill and in the hospital in 1951, but remained in the legislature until her defeat in the 1956 Democratic primary by nursing home operator Evelyn G. Stone.
