= LeBoeuf Creek =

LeBoeuf Creek or Leboeuf Creek may refer to:

- Leboeuf Creek (Missouri), a tributary of the Gasconade River
- LeBoeuf Creek (Pennsylvania), a tributary of French Creek
