= Slaughter Branch =

Stream in the American state of Missouri

Slaughter Branch is a stream in northern Franklin County in the U.S. state of Missouri. It is a tributary to Brushy Creek.

The headwaters of the stream are at 38°31′02″N 91°10′22″W and the confluence with Brushy Creek is at 38°31′02″N 91°07′06″W. The source area for the stream lies just south of Campbellton and Missouri Route 185.

Slaughter Branch most likely derives its name from George Slaughterback, a pioneer citizen.

== See also ==
- List of rivers of Missouri
