= Meramec Conservation Area =

Protected land in Missouri, U.S.

- IUCN category IV (habitat/species management area)
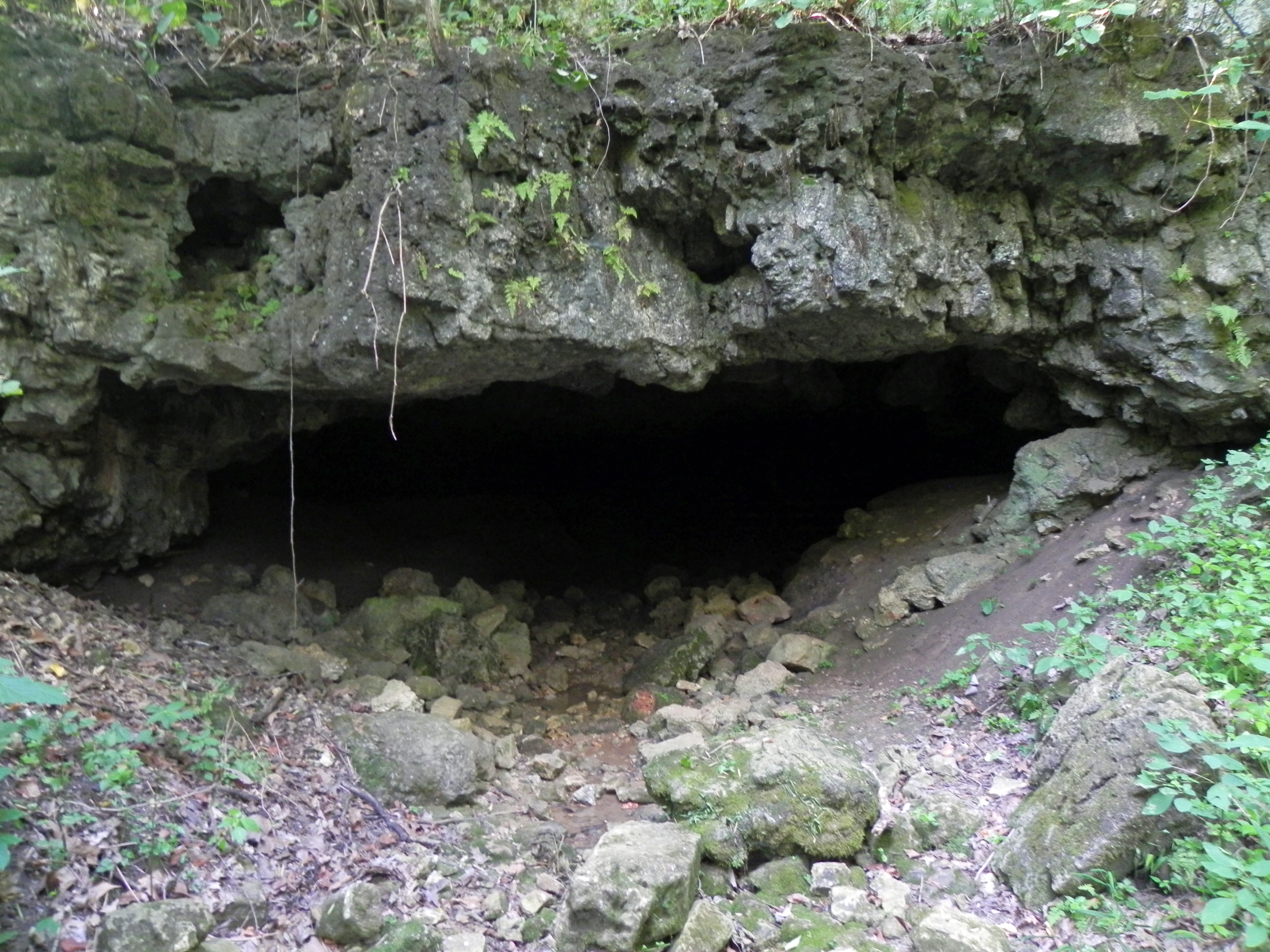
- Lone Hill Onyx Cave in Meramec Conservation Area

- Location within Missouri
- Location: Franklin County, Missouri, United States
- Nearest city: Sullivan, MO
- Coordinates: 38°13′50″N 91°04′15″W
- Area: 3,938 acres (15.9 km^{2})
- Governing body: Missouri Department of Conservation
- Website: Official website

Meramec Conservation Area consists of 3,938 acres (15.94 km^{2}) in southern Franklin County, Missouri. It is located southeast of the town of Sullivan and bordered to the south by Missouri Route 185 and to the west by the Meramec River and Meramec State Park. It is part of the Meramec Greenway, which is over 28,000 acres (110 km^{2}) of public land along the Meramec River.

Most of the land that comprises the Meramec Conservation Area was acquired by the state between 1925 and 1930. A donation of 166 acres (0.67 km^{2}) was made in 1980 by Dorothy Hill in memory of Arthur Heyne. Historic sites in the area include the first state nursery, a Civilian Conservation Corps camp, Lone Hill fire lookout tower, as well as old mines. The area is hills that are mostly forested as well as a great blue heron rookery.

The Woodland Trail is a 1.3 miles (2.1 km) disabled-accessible trail along the river bottom that passes by Lone Hill Onyx Cave, one of six caves in the conservation area. There is also a 0.1 miles (0.16 km) CCC trail, 5.5 miles (8.9 km) Reedville Loop hiking trail, and 10.5 miles (16.9 km) multi-use trail open to hiking, biking, and horseback riding. Hunting, trapping, and fishing are permitted with permits and in season in most of the conservation area except for the wildlife refuge. As of December 31, 2012 all caves on public lands in Missouri, including those in Meramec Conservation Area, are closed to the general public due to white nose syndrome.

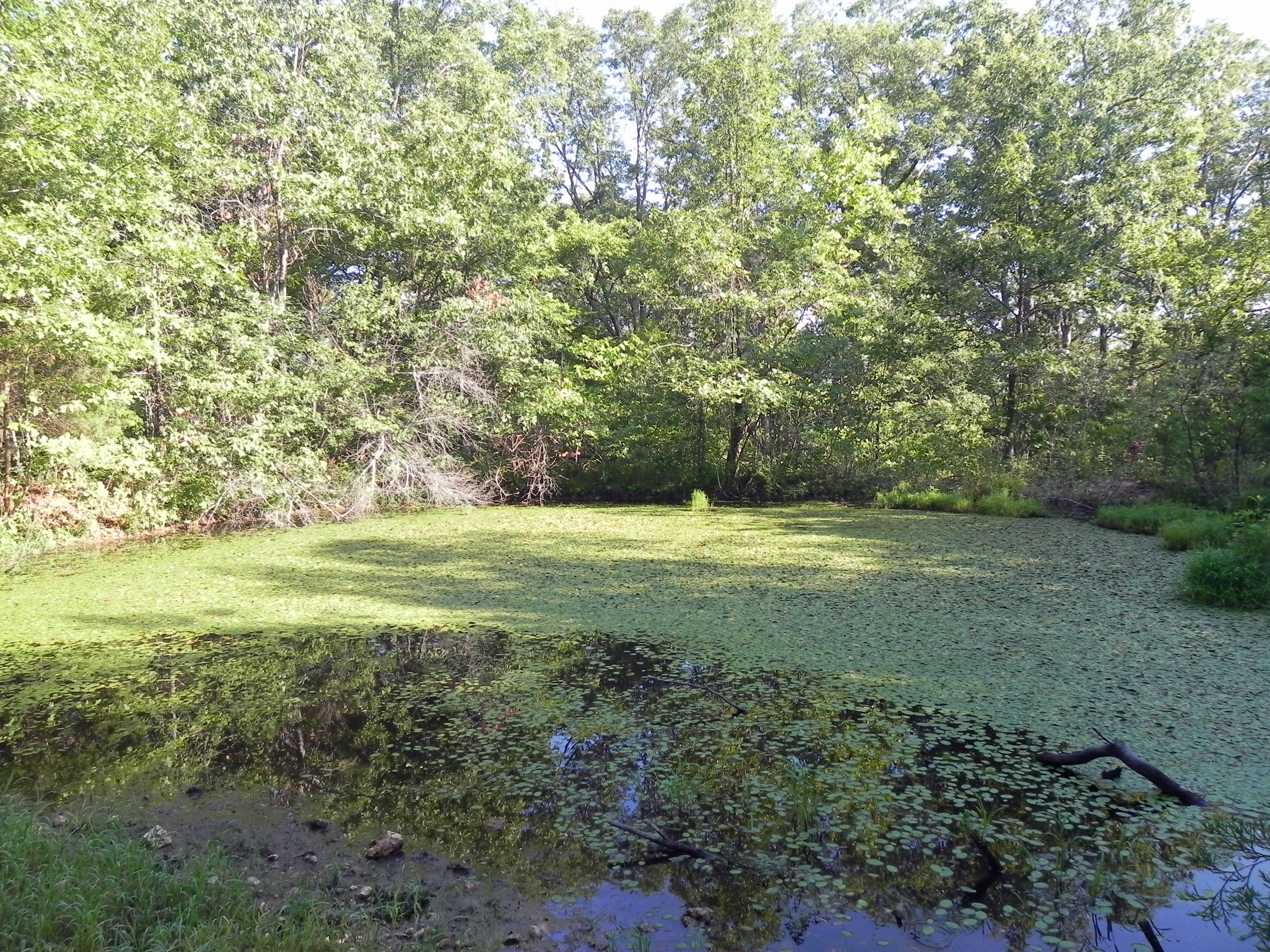
A pond in Meramec Conservation Area
