= Dissen, Franklin County, Missouri =

Unincorporated community in Missouri, U.S.

Coordinates: 38°33′35″N 91°16′34″W

Dissen is an unincorporated community in western Franklin County, in the U.S. state of Missouri. The community is located on the north side of Boeuf Creek along Missouri Route Y and four miles southwest of New Haven.

== History ==
A post office called Dissen was established in 1899, and remained in operation until 1909. The community took its name from Dissen, a town in Germany.
