= Gasconade Bridge train disaster =

1855 railroad accident in Missouri

Coordinates: 38.669211°N 91.553278°W

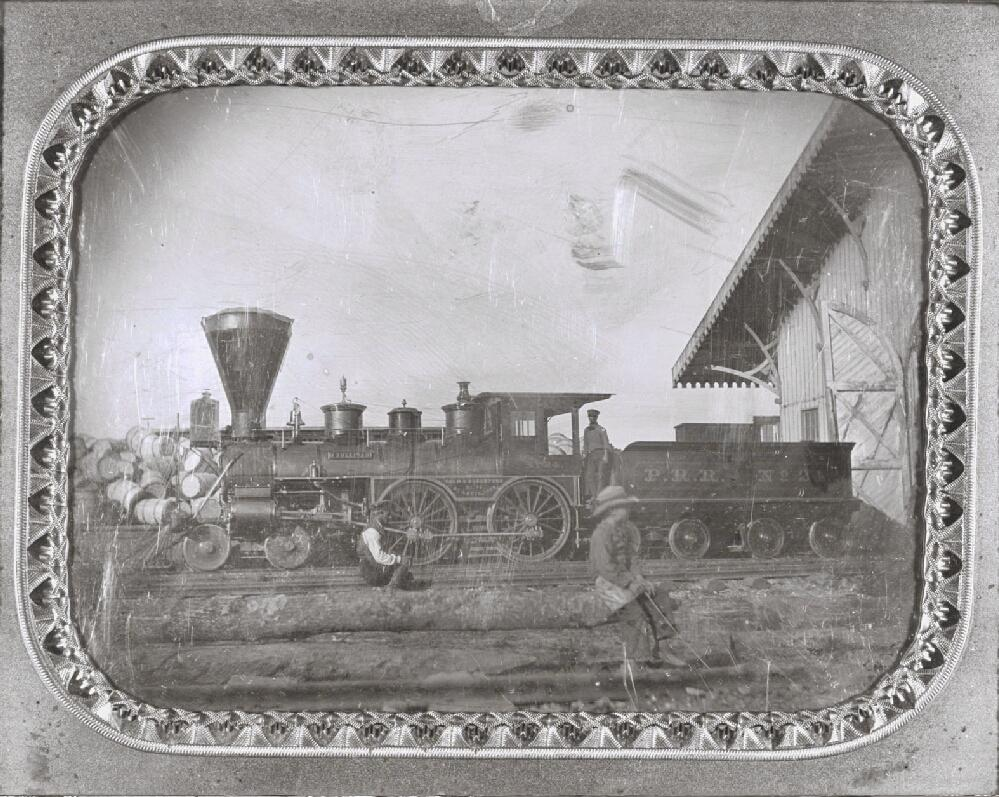
- The locomotive O'Sullivan

Details
- Date: November 1, 1855
- Location: Gasconade, Missouri
- Country: United States
- Line: Pacific Railroad
- Incident type: Derailment
- Cause: Disputed, Excessive speed. (official); Bridge design flaw. (New York Times)

Statistics
- Trains: 1
- Passengers: at least 600
- Deaths: 30+
- Injured: Hundreds

The Gasconade Bridge train disaster was a rail accident in Gasconade, Missouri, on November 1, 1855. The Gasconade bridge collapsed under the locomotive O'Sullivan while crossing. More than thirty were killed in the first major deadly bridge collapse in American history.

== History ==
At the time of the disaster, the Pacific Railroad was being built west from St. Louis, which was to be the starting point for the first transcontinental railroad, an effort led by Senator Thomas Hart Benton of Missouri. Construction had begun on the railroad on July 4, 1851, and two years later it had reached Kirkwood; by 1855 the railroad was completed to Jefferson City. The railroad bridge at Gasconade, a 760-foot wooden structure spanning the Gasconade River, was unfinished, but track was supported by temporary trestle.

== Accident ==
On November 1, a day of heavy rain, the inaugural train carrying some 600 invited visitors and dignitaries, including Henry Chouteau, of the founding family of St. Louis, set out from downtown at 9 a.m. led by the locomotive Missouri. The departure was preceded by music and speechmaking. Thomas O'Sullivan was chief engineer on the train. O'Sullivan considered stopping to check the Gasconade Bridge but because the train was behind schedule he opted not to stop. He felt reassured of its stability, as a gravel-hauling train had traveled over it the day before. A single locomotive preceded the train across the bridge as a final check for any problems.

As the train started over the bridge, the span between the east bank and the first pier collapsed. The steam engine and seven of the cars fell through the wooden timbers and the others rolled down the 36 foot embankment into the riverbed (but fortunately not in the water). Only one car remained on the tracks. The engine tipped over backwards and landed on the first passenger car, which carried many dignitaries. Thirty-one people were killed (later revised to 43 killed), including Chouteau, O'Sullivan, and many other prominent St. Louis citizens. Newspapers named 136 as injured but estimated up to 200 more unnamed. (In this age of primitive medicine, germ theory and sterile wound dressing were not yet known. Simple wounds could be fatal due to infections. Twenty-nine people were killed outright, but hundreds were injured. The true number of fatalities is unknown.)

Passengers on the train included many well known people including Mayor Washington King of St. Louis (badly cut), Mayor Madison Miller of Carondolet (badly injured), Erastus Wells, President of St. Louis omnibus company (not injured), and Thomas O'Flaherty, Kate Chopin's father, as well as bankers, judges, representatives in the state legislature and their friends and children. Only two women were on the train. For some time after the accident, passengers were marked by cuts, scratches, bruises, blackened faces (presumably from bruising), and sometimes by broken limbs.

== Investigation ==
The railroad commissioned an investigation of the accident.

The plan was a truss bridge of six spans, two of 130 ft each, two of 140 ft, two of 92 feet resting on five stone piers and abutments, 32 feet high. The false work, consisting of trestles to facilitate construction of the bridge, was strengthened to prepare for the train and tested with heavy gravel cars. The commission found the trestles were of traditional railroad design made of three to four posts (called bents) driven into the river bed. Caps on the posts held stringers, on which were mounted floor boards and then ties and rails. The trestles were held together with 2" oak dowel rods. They were stabilized with diagonal planks. The stone piers were completed; the trestles were spaced at 15 ft intervals across the river. The stone piers of the bridge were built by Saler, Schulenburg & Co. The wooden trestle was built by Stone, Boomer & Co., of Chicago, “men of great experience building bridges in the West.”

The investigation found that the trestle design should have been sufficient for the weight of the train at slow speed (4 mph). The engineer had been instructed to speed up going into the curve before the bridge, and then cut steam and coast across. The track leading to the abutment was newly installed and was rough. Although the engineer claimed his speed was 5 mph, witnesses estimated the speed at 15 to 30 mph. The commission cited excessive speed as the cause of the accident. Julius W. Adams, Principal Engineer of the Lexington and Danville Railroad, offered the opinion that excessive speed and roughness of the tracks had caused the locomotive to derail on the first section of the bridge damaging the floorboards. The floorboards were found broken in half.

A New York Times report of the investigation featured the contrary opinion of Mr. Darius Hunkins, a contractor on the site. He thought the bridge timber insufficient and specifically cited the distance of 16 ft between the points of support in the trestle vs 10 ft in other trestles on the road.

== Details ==
The excursion train left the 7th Street Station in St. Louis at 9:00 a.m., Thursday, November 1, with 14 cars, including one baggage car. After a stop at the 14th Street Station, three cars were dropped at Cheltenham to reduce weight, increase speed and stay on schedule. Invited guests were picked up at other stations along the line. In Hermann, additional National Guardsmen boarded.

The accident happened at about 1:30 p.m. The quick work of brakeman Radcliff is credited with keeping the last four cars from falling into the riverbed. Three of those derailed and fell over beside the rails. Only the last car remained on the tracks.

The excursion train was followed by a locomotive running in reverse. Because Jefferson City had no turntable, this engine was to bring the train back to St. Louis. In the event, this engine and the remaining car promptly returned to Hermann. The locomotive blew its whistle for the length of the trip to alert residents. The National Guard troop from Hermann was criticized for returning without assisting the injured. In some reports they marched back to Hermann. Conductor English is credited with walking back to Hermann to bring the relief train. More likely the Guard, the conductor and the first survivors rode in the last car.

== Response ==
While a conductor attempted to telegraph for help in nearby Hermann, the rain storm had disabled the telegraph lines and first word of the disaster did not reach St. Louis until 8 p.m., some 7 hours after the bridge's collapse. Some reports say the telegraph was out of service due to bad weather; others say the line had no telegraph. News of the accident arrived in St. Louis by steamboat.

The Missouri Republican from November 2, 1855, contained stories on both the inaugural trip of the Pacific Railroad and the ensuing tragedy. On the former topic, the article ends "How little do we know what an hour may bring forth! The above paragraphs had hardly been written when reports came of a terrible disaster in an attempt to cross the Gasconade Bridge. At a later hour, we received the melancholy particulars which are detailed in another article." The follow-up article contained the names of the dead and seriously injured. Others were less severely injured, but the paper did not name them. The list of wounded appeared a few days later.

Hermann was the end-of-line for the Pacific Railroad until the Jefferson City division was opened. A relief train was made up at Hermann from the reverse locomotive and cars available there. Survivors and construction crews at the wreck site worked to free those trapped in the wreckage and helped load the dead onto a freight car. The relief train left the wreck site with the wounded and dead at about 5 pm Thursday.

Fear of additional bridge failures due to high water and flooding delayed the return to St. Louis. When the excursion train crossed Boeuf Creek bridge east of New Haven, MO, the temporary bridge sank a foot. It was a rainy day. It was raining when the excursion train reached Hermann but let up at the time of the accident. Torrential rains were reported later in the day.

On the way back to St. Louis, the relief train was stopped by flood waters at Boeuf Creek. The bridge was in danger of collapsing. Survivors that could walk crossed the bridge on foot and boarded a second train on the other side. Crew then began pushing the cars across by hand. With the first car, the bridge collapsed leaving cars with the wounded and dead on the New Haven side. Those who walked across the bridge got to St. Louis at about midnight. About 150 passengers including 30 to 40 of the injured arrived in a four car train.

Seriously wounded survivors and deceased were transported from New Haven to Washington by ferryboat and reached St. Louis by train the next day. Other injured passengers remained at Hermann and Washington. The railroad suspended service west of Washington until bridges could be repaired or replaced. The city of St. Louis was shut down to accommodate the funerals. In St. Louis, 12 of the dead are buried at Bellefontaine Cemetery, 6 are buried in Calvary Cemetery (including Henry Chouteau) and several are buried in the old Wesleyan Cemetery.

Some believe the Pacific Railroad had engaged in shoddy construction. The railroad hoped the excursion would convince the state legislature to authorize additional funds. The Pacific Railroad was privately funded, but financing required the state to guarantee the railroad's bonds.

In addition to the Boeuf Creek bridge, bridges over the Moreau River and Loose Creek (between Gasconade and Jefferson City) failed during the storm. Claims of shoddy construction became more credible. The railroad noted that of the 60 bridges between St. Louis and Jefferson City, 50 were complete. Those failing were among those not yet finished.

Newspapers reported additional concerns. Some victims were robbed of their valuables at the wreck site. Residents of Hermann were accused of denying aid to the survivors and the injured. Those who remained at the wreck overnight were refused aid in Hermann the next morning. Some were charged excessive prices for supplies. The Leimer Hotel in Hermann was used as a temporary hospital to treat the wounded. The Irish at Miller's Landing (renamed New Haven, MO in 1856) were complimented for their hospitality. Scavengers arrived at the wreck site the next day and carried off anything of value. Surviving cars from the wreck and the locomotive and tender were brought to Jefferson City by ferry boat.

A Pacific Railroad train did eventually reach Jefferson City four months later, but St. Louis's plan to be the starting point of the transcontinental railroad was unsuccessful. In 1869, the First transcontinental railroad was completed at Promontory Summit, Utah, originally stretching from Sacramento to Omaha. The Pacific Railroad was renamed Missouri Pacific in 1867 and later became a part of Union Pacific in 1982.

In 1861, the Gasconade River Bridge was one of those burned in Missouri's conflict with secessionists in the early days of the Civil War. Gov. Claiborne Jackson and General Sterling Price ordered railroad bridges burned as they fled the June 11, Planter's House Hotel meeting in St. Louis with General Nathaniel Lyon. They intended to delay pursuit by General Lyon, but he followed by steamboat. The Osage River Bridge was also burned. The result was the Battle of Boonville.

== See also ==
- Daniel M. Grissom, journalist aboard the train
