= Calvin Case (businessman) =

Director of the North Missouri Railroad
- In office 1853–1855

Personal details
- Born: 1804 Steuben County, New York, U.S.
- Died: November 1, 1855 (aged 50–51) Gasconade, Missouri, U.S.
- Cause of death: Gasconade Bridge train disaster
- Resting place: Bellefontaine Cemetery, St. Louis, Missouri, U.S.
- Profession: Businessman

Calvin Case (1804 – November 1, 1855) of St. Louis, Missouri.

Calvin Case was born in Steuben County, New York, in 1804. In the 1840 Census, he was recorded in Conesville, Schoharie County, New York, with his family. He was shown as a tradesman.

Case arrived in St. Louis, Missouri, as a steamboat captain. The Missouri Republican issue of November 11, 1841, reported that riverboat Captain Case had opened a boatyard near the site of the old brewery in St. Louis. Case soon partnered with William Nelson to form Case & Nelson, a river salvaging business that operated on the Mississippi River from Galena, Illinois, to the Gulf of Mexico.

In 1842, James Eads affiliated with the salvage firm. He is best known for building Eads Bridge across the Mississippi River at St. Louis. In between his company built ironclad gunboats at Carondelet, Missouri, for the Union during the Civil War. Later he built jetties in the Mississippi River delta to prevent silting. In 1842, he was inexperience and untrained, but energetic and mechanically inclined. He designed a diving bell to facilitate salvage. He joined Case & Nelson after showing them his design. His primitive diving bell consisted of a wine barrel with bottom removed and weighted with lead to settle on the bottom. In the early days Eads was the diver in the bell. The firm prospered salvaging valuable metals and other durable materials from riverboat wrecks.

In September 1843, Erastus Wells arrived in St. Louis from New York. Case financed the first omnibus company in St. Louis using a salvaged Army wagon. Wells originally drove the omnibus. By 1849, the company had expanded to 15 omnibus lines. In 1850, Case, Wells, and partners Lawrence Matthews and Robert McBlenis (O’Blenis) consolidated the St. Louis omnibus lines under the name Case & Co.

In 1848, Captain Calvin Case of St. Louis was listed as a reference for the firm of Matteson & Preston of St. Louis, Commission and Forwarding Agents. In the 1850 Census, he was listed as an omnibus owner with family in St. Louis Ward 6. His assets were shown as $34,000, equivalent to $1,300,000 in 2025.

Case served as a director of the North Missouri Railroad from 1853 to 1855.

He was killed in the Gasconade Bridge train disaster when a Pacific Railroad excursion train crashed through a temporary bridge over the Gasconade River on November 1, 1855. In 1856, Case & Co. was dissolved to settle his estate. Erastus Wells retained the Market Street & Chestnut and Olive St. omnibus lines. In 1859, they were converted to street railways with horse cars under the name Missouri Railroad Co. Wells served as president of Missouri Railroad until 1881. In 1887, the Olive Street line converted to cable cars, and was electrified to streetcars in 1901.
