= Wilhelm Pelster House-Barn =

Historic house in Missouri, United States

- U.S. National Register of Historic Places
- Location within Missouri Location within the United States
- Location: S of New Haven, near New Haven, Missouri
- Coordinates: 38°29′36″N 91°16′20″W
- Area: 38 acres (15 ha)
- Built: c. 1860-1864
- Built by: Pelster, Wilhelm
- Architectural style: Fachwerk construction
- NRHP reference No.: 78001645
- Added to NRHP: December 5, 1978

The Wilhelm Pelster House-Barn, also known as the Pelster-Panhorst House-Barn, is a historic home and barn located near New Haven, Franklin County, Missouri. It was built by German immigrant Wilhelm Pelster between about 1860 and 1864, and is a combined house and barn of Fachwerk construction. The banked half-timbered and masonry building has four interior levels and measures approximately 60 feet wide by 53 feet deep.

The Wilhelm Pelster house-barn has four sections. There is a house, a stable, a granary, and a hayloft, all under one roof. Several building techniques are illustrated. One technique in the barn is fachwerk. Fachwerk is a classic German construction technique. It consists of cross strut beams and individually filled compartments. The cross bracing is designed to keep the walls straight, from bending in the wind. In the granary, a mortise and tenon system was used. There are even pencil calculations on what appears to be a creamy white mortar substance that fills the gaps between the timbers. The house side of the structure uses lath for its walls. The ceilings in the house are made of narrow strips of wood. This building is a piece of construction history, techniques used by German immigrants.

It was listed on the National Register of Historic Places in 1978.

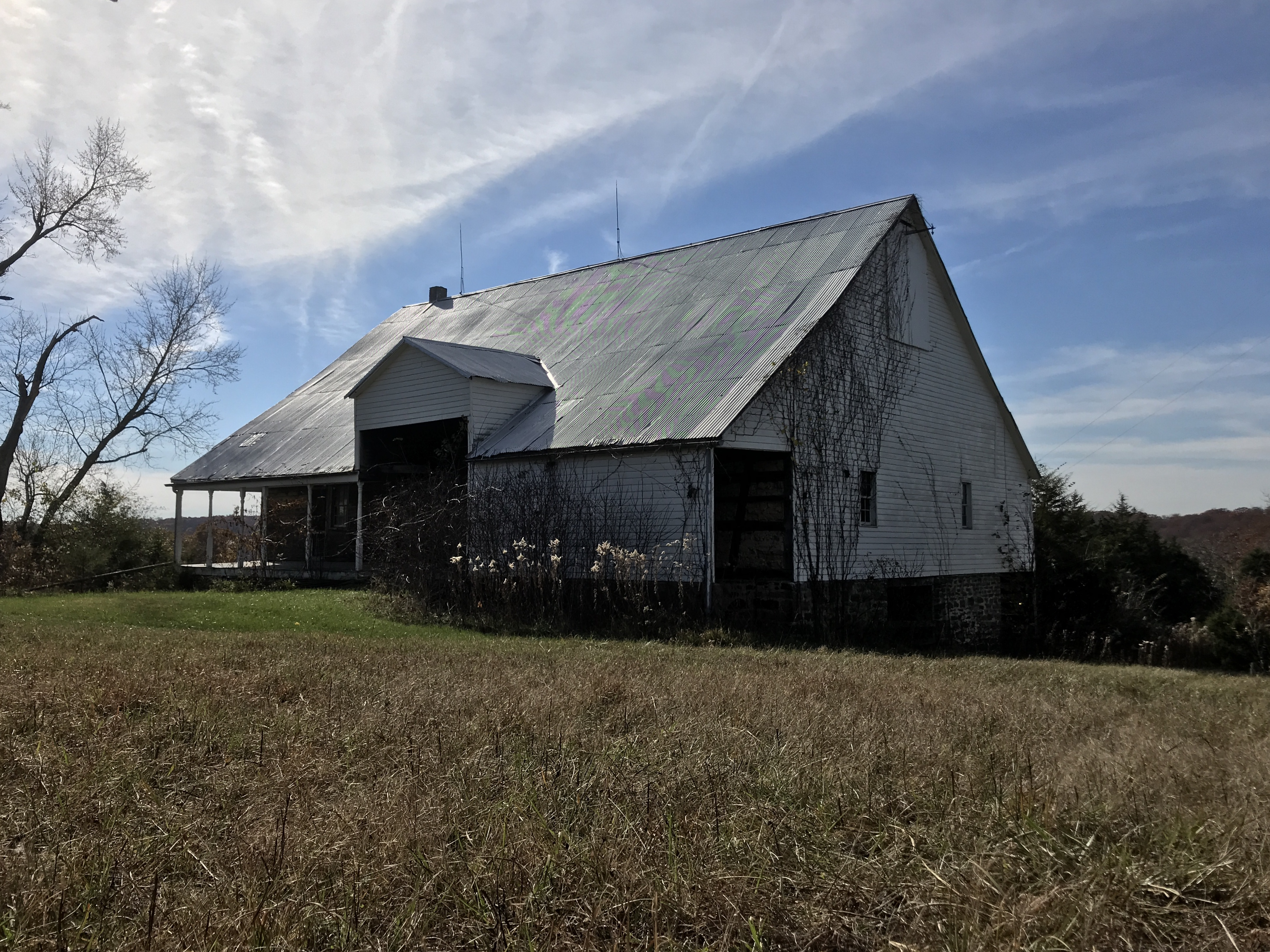
View of the Wilhelm Pelster House-Barn, Fall 2017
