= New Haven Township, Franklin County, Missouri =

Township in Franklin County, Missouri, U.S.

Coordinates: 38.604770°N 91.217874°W

New Haven Township is an inactive township in Franklin County, in the U.S. state of Missouri.

It was established in 1873, taking its name from the community of New Haven, Missouri.
