= New Haven Commercial Historic District =

Historic district in Missouri, United States

- U.S. National Register of Historic Places
- U.S. Historic district
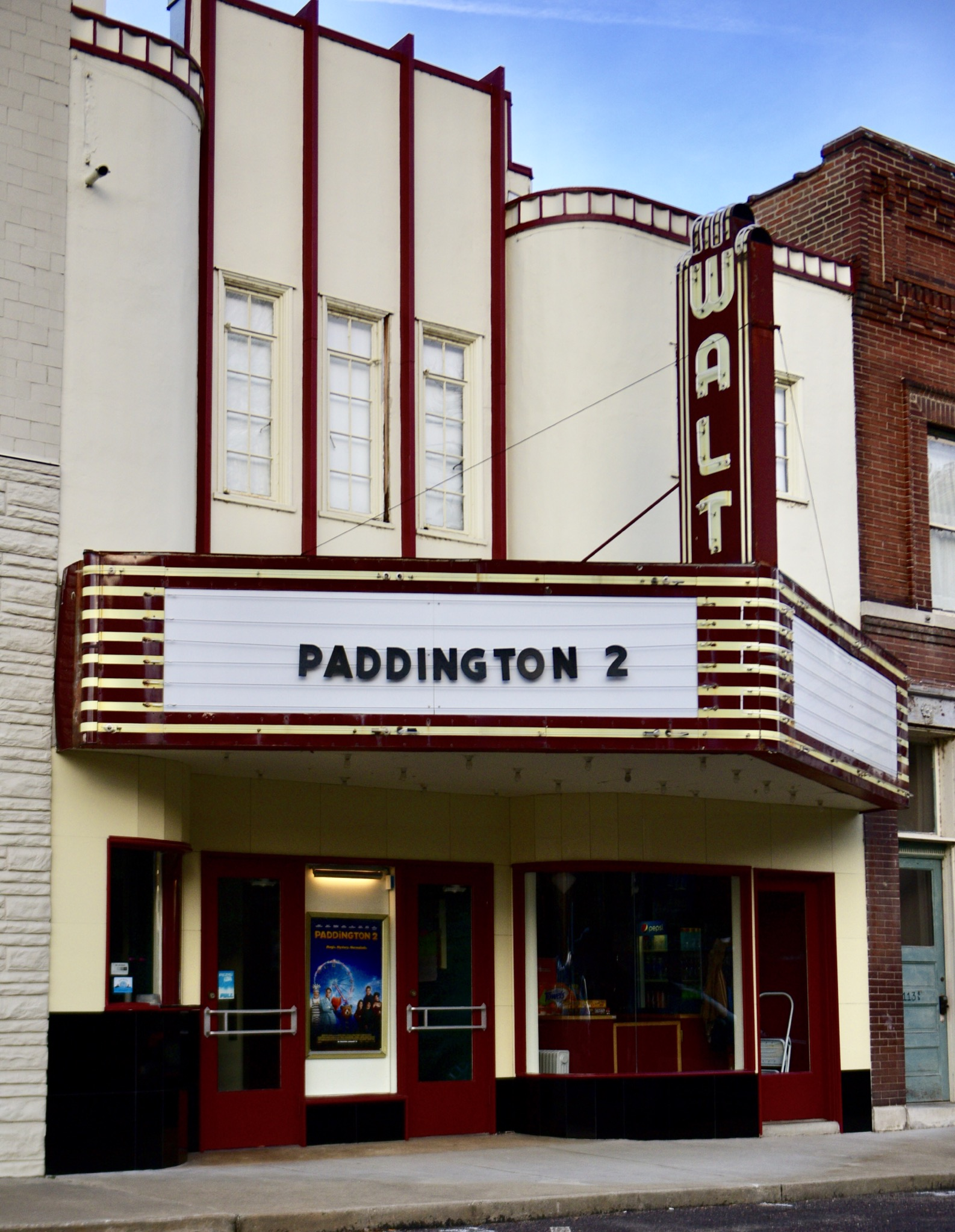
- Walt Theatre (1940)

- Location within Missouri Location within the United States
- Location: 111-139 Front St. New Haven, Missouri
- Coordinates: 38°36′50″N 91°12′52″W
- Area: less than one acre
- Architectural style: Italianate, Art Deco
- NRHP reference No.: 99000531
- Added to NRHP: May 5, 1999

New Haven Commercial Historic District is a national historic district located at New Haven, Franklin County, Missouri. The district encompasses nine contributing buildings in the central business district of New Haven. The district developed between about 1890 and 1940, and includes representative examples of Italianate and Art Deco style architecture. Notable buildings include the John P. Altheide Store (c. 1890), Oscar Hoemeyer Hardware Store (1895), New Haven post Office / Farmer's Savings Bank (c. 1897), Frederick W. Pehle Building / Krull's Department Store (1905), Otto Bucholtz Store (c. 1930), and Walt Theater (1940).

It was listed on the National Register of Historic Places in 1999.
