= Erastus Wells =

American politician (1823–1893)

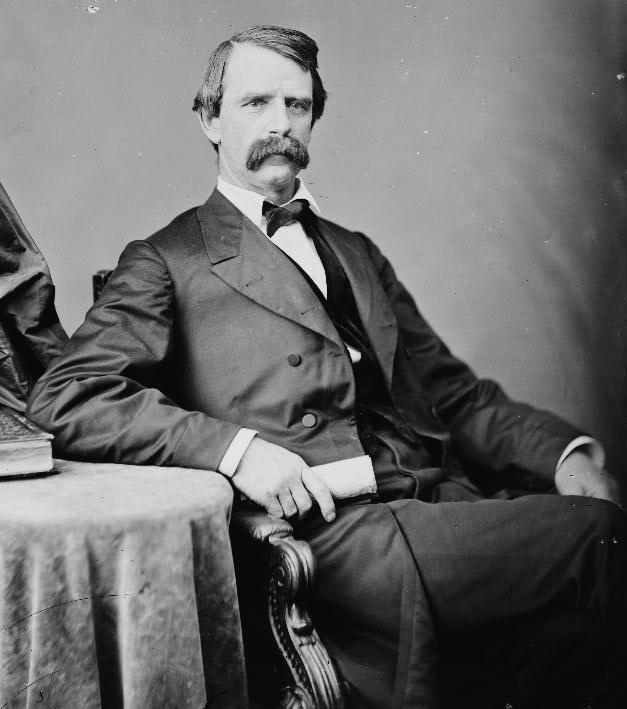

Member of the U.S. House of Representatives from Missouri
- In office March 4, 1869 – March 3, 1877
- Preceded by: William A. Pile
- Succeeded by: Nathan Cole
- Constituency: 1st district (1869–73); 2nd district (1873–77)
- In office March 4, 1879 – March 3, 1881
- Preceded by: Nathan Cole
- Succeeded by: Thomas Allen
- Constituency: 2nd district

Personal details
- Born: December 2, 1823 Sackets Harbor, New York, US
- Died: October 2, 1893 (aged 69) St. Louis, Missouri, US
- Party: Democratic
- Spouse: Isabella Bowman Henry Wells
- Profession: Politician, Businessman

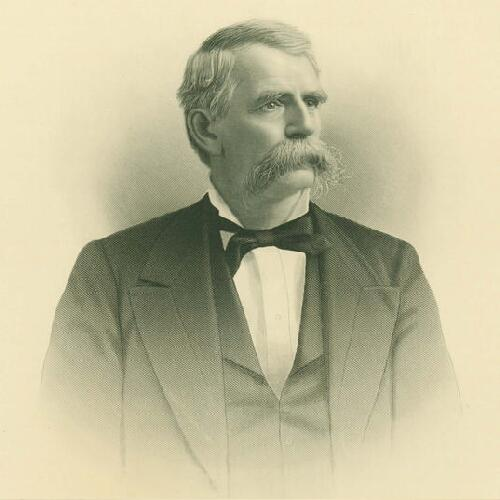
Erastus Wells

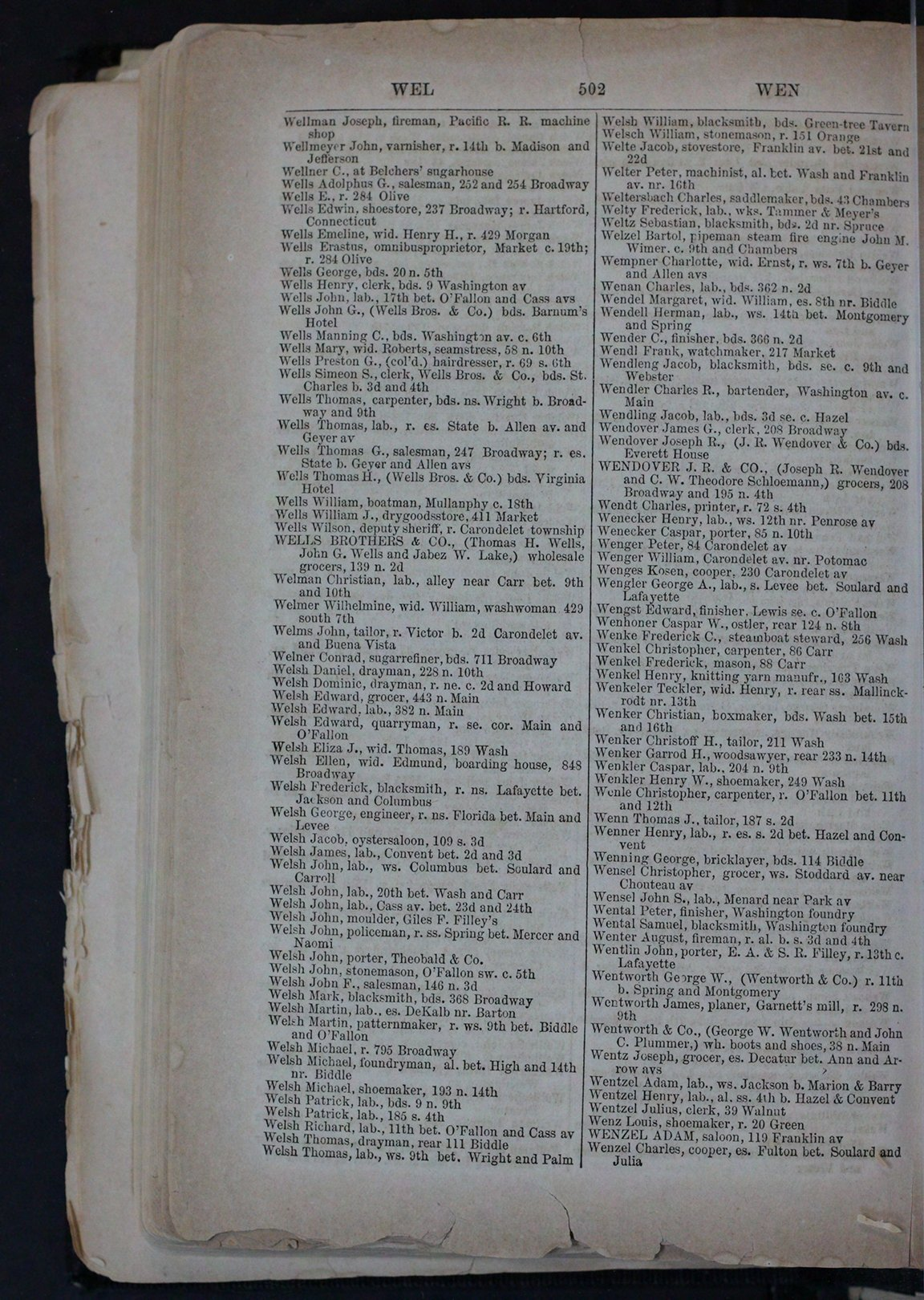
Erastus Wells listing in the 1859 St. Louis City Directory

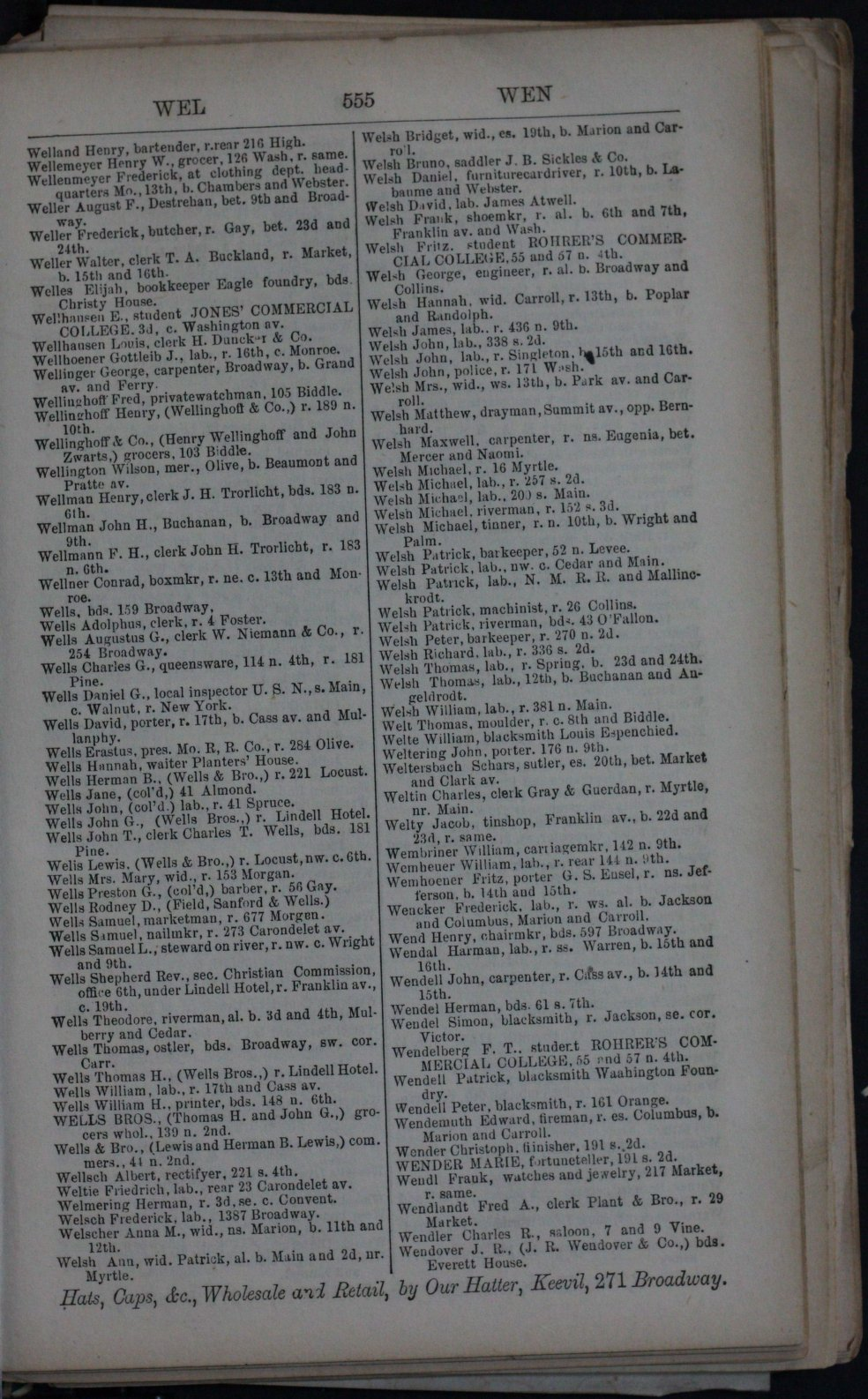
Erastus Wells listing in the 1864 St. Louis City Directory

Erastus Wells (December 2, 1823 – October 2, 1893) was a 19th-century politician and businessman from Missouri. Wells was born in Jefferson County, New York, and was the only son of Otis Wells, a descendant of Hugh Welles, an early colonist of Wethersfield, Connecticut. Otis Wells was a farmer and died when Erastus was only fourteen. Erastus was the grandson of Ethelinda Otis and a relation of John Otis, who helped found the town of Hingham, Massachusetts in 1635. Other notable relatives include James Otis, a successful lawyer, Harrison Gray Otis, a statesman and orator, Samuel A. Otis, one of the framers of the constitution of Massachusetts, and George Otis, a clergyman and author.

Wells married Isabella Bowman Henry, daughter of Captain John Henry of Jacksonville, Illinois, in 1850. Isabella and Erastus Wells were the parents of three children, including former St. Louis Mayor Rolla Wells. Wells' first wife died in 1877 and he was later remarried to Eleanor P. Bell of St. Louis in 1879.

== Professional career ==
Wells lived on a farm and attended district schools from ages 12 to 16. At 16, Wells left the farm and moved to Watertown, New York, later moving on to Lockport, New York. He moved to St. Louis, Missouri, in September, 1843. After being inspired by the omnibuses he observed in New York, he established the first omnibus line in St. Louis with the help of Calvin Case, a prominent resident of St. Louis. The omnibus was the first of its kind west of the Mississippi. In 1850, Wells and Case partnered with Robert O'Blennus and Lawrence Matthews on the bus lines. One of the most profitable lines for the business was a coach to Belleville, Illinois. Erastus Wells was a passenger on the Pacific Railroad excursion train that crashed through the temporary bridge over the Gasconade River on November 1, 1855, the Gasconade Bridge train disaster. He was uninjured but his partner, Calvin Case, was killed in the accident.

After the success of the bus lines, Wells helped in organizing another transportation venture, the Missouri Railway Company, and served as its president until 1881. The first Missouri Railway Company car operated on July 4, 1859. Evidence of Wells' changing profession can be seen in the St. Louis City Directories, in which he is listed as omnibus proprietor in 1859 and as pres. Mo. R.R. Co. in 1864. Wells eventually sold his interest in the Railway Company, but moved on to many other prominent positions. He was president of the Narrow-Gauge Railway, director in the Ohio and Mississippi Railroad, president of the Accommodation Bank, director and vice-president of the Commercial Bank, and president of the Laclede Gas-Light Company. Wells also had a part in the erection of the Southern Hotel.

=== West End Narrow Gauge Railroad ===
The West End Narrow Gauge Railroad began as an idea with Wells and James C. Page. They lived in Wellston in an era when accommodation trains gave those in the suburbs easy access to the city. They sought better service in Wellston. In 1875, Wells spoke at a group who planned a narrow gauge railroad to compete with the Missouri Pacific Railroad serving Kirkwood and Webster Groves. He said narrow gauge roads were 50% less costly than standard gauge railroads. Narrow gauge required only 25 ft of right of way. He gave costs as: grading $3K/mi, ties $800, spikes $300, iron rails $3K, and construction $375 for a total of $7500/mi without real estate. Or with right of way about $12K/mi. The line could be completed in 6 months. Expenses on the West End Railroad were given as $15/day, receipts $35. Not more than 8 cars would be required at a cost of $15 to $16K. Locomotives would be more.

Wells and Page proposed construction of the West End Narrow Gauge line in 1871, and again in 1872. The original plan would run via Wellston from Grand Ave. 140 ft north of Olive to Florissant. The Florissant extension was to be funded by their issue of $25K in bonds. Florissant agreed but state law limited bonds to 10% of assessed valuation making the bonds illegal. A route to Creve Coeur Lake was surveyed as an alternate. In 1873, 100 men were grading the route. Construction was delayed by the Panic of 1873.

It was January 9, 1875 before final construction began. The first train ran on June 11, 1875 from Grand Avenue to Kienlan Avenue in Wellston, a distance of five miles. The line was formally opened on June 17. An excursion train brought guests in two passenger cars and a flat car to Wellston where they were met by Wells who escorted guests to his nearby residence. The 8 mile trip from 4th & Olive was expected to take 1.5 hr to Wellston. The road was equipped with two locomotives, two passenger cars, and 10 freight cars. Trains were to run every half hour.

In October 1876, they reached Normandy; October 1, 1878, Florissant. The Narrow Gauge Railroad was known as the St. Louis & Florissant Narrow Gauge Railroad. The line was sold under foreclosure on March 18, 1879, to the Missouri Horse Railroad Co. Erastus Wells was President and his son, Rolla Wells was Superintendent. The road had stations at Carsonville, Scudder, Graham's, Taylor Rd, and Florissant. An additional station was reportedly located at Union Ave. The roundhouse and machine shop was in St. Ferdinand.

Sale of the railroad by Erastus Wells to an unnamed buyer was first reported in 1882. It was never a “paying concern." It had 16 miles of track from Grand to Florissant. On June 7, 1883, the buyer was revealed as the Cable & Western Railway, an Indianapolis syndicate. They planned to build a cable car line to downtown St. Louis.

In 1887, the narrow gauge railroad was considered as a possible route to Forest Park. The city objected to the smoke of the railroad. They favored conversion of the line to cable with a branch to Forest Park down Taylor Ave. In return they required the railroad to stop using steam within the city limits. The width of the narrow gauge right of way did not allow two directional cable and was considered impractical. Wells' Missouri Railway was a cable car line that ran down Olive Street. A route down Boyle to Maryland Street, and then to Kingshighway was approved. Service began on June 1, 1889.

In June 1890, the Cable & Western Railway was sold to the St. Louis & Suburban Railway. The cable was abandoned in 1891; the route was converted to electric streetcars to Wellston. It was known as the Suburban line. The streetcar lines of St. Louis were consolidated under United Railways. In 1905, they were acquired by North American Co., which also owned Laclede Gas Light and Union Electric.

In 1906, Suburban was the only car line in St. Louis not operated by United Railways. United Railways acquired Suburban in December 1909. The streetcar line to Wellston was renamed the Hodiamont line.

== Political career ==
Erastus Wells's political career began in 1848, with an election to the city council. He retained his seat there for fourteen years until he resigned to take his seat in Congress in 1869. As a member of the city council, Wells was elected chairman of a special committee on water-works to initiate the building of a new water-works in St. Louis. Other members of the committee included Thomas C. Chester and L.W. Mitchell. As chairman, Wells visited several cities, including Boston, New York, and Washington, to research other water-works systems. After returning to St. Louis, the committee drafted a report of their findings, which spurred the legislature to pass an act authorizing the City of St. Louis to fund the construction of a new water-works, at a cost of three million dollars. He also made note of police systems in the cities he visited, as he thought the police system in St. Louis to be inadequate. Based on a metropolitan police bill passed by the Legislature of Maryland, Wells adapted it to fit the laws of Missouri and submitted the bill to the state Legislature during the 1860-1861 session. The Governor, Claiborn Jackson, signed the bill, beginning a new era for the St. Louis metropolitan police system.

On March 4, 1869 Wells took his seat in the United States House of Representatives, where he would remain for eight years, during the presidency of Ulysses S. Grant. Although Wells was a Democrat and disagreed with Grant politically, the two were friends during Wells' term in Congress. As a member of Congress, Wells secured four million dollars in funding towards the building of the St. Louis Post Office and Custom House. He also worked to improve the Mississippi River, working with Captain James B. Eads on legislation regarding the promotion of the Eads Jetties. Wells' interest in rail transportation continued into his service in Congress, with a speech he gave on February 24, 1875, supporting a bill that granted aid to the Atlantic and Pacific Railroad and the Texas and Pacific Railway. Wells's speech asked Congress to support this bill, which would assist in the construction of a central rail line from the Mississippi River to the Pacific coast. Wells also introduced one of many bills put forward between 1870 and 1873 to establish the Territory of Oklahoma.

== Death and legacy ==
Wells died on October 2, 1893, aged 69, at Wellston, his country home. He was buried at Bellefontaine Cemetery in St. Louis two days later.

The city of Wellston, Missouri, was named after him. Wells purchased 66 acres of land in St. Louis County in 1868 and built a three-story brick house on the property, which was the family's country home. That piece of land is part of what is now Wellston. A few years after his death in 1893, the house burned down; the cause of the fire was never determined.

U.S. House of Representatives
Preceded by William A. Pile	Member of the U.S. House of Representatives from Missouri's 1st congressional district March 4, 1869 – March 3, 1873	Succeeded by Edwin O. Stanard
Preceded by Gustavus A. Finkelnburg	Member of the U.S. House of Representatives from Missouri's 2nd congressional district March 4, 1873 – March 3, 1877	Succeeded by Nathan Cole
Preceded by Nathan Cole	Member of the U.S. House of Representatives from Missouri's 2nd congressional district March 4, 1879 – March 3, 1881	Succeeded by Thomas Allen
