= New Haven Residential Historic District =

Historic district in Missouri, United States

- U.S. National Register of Historic Places
- U.S. Historic district
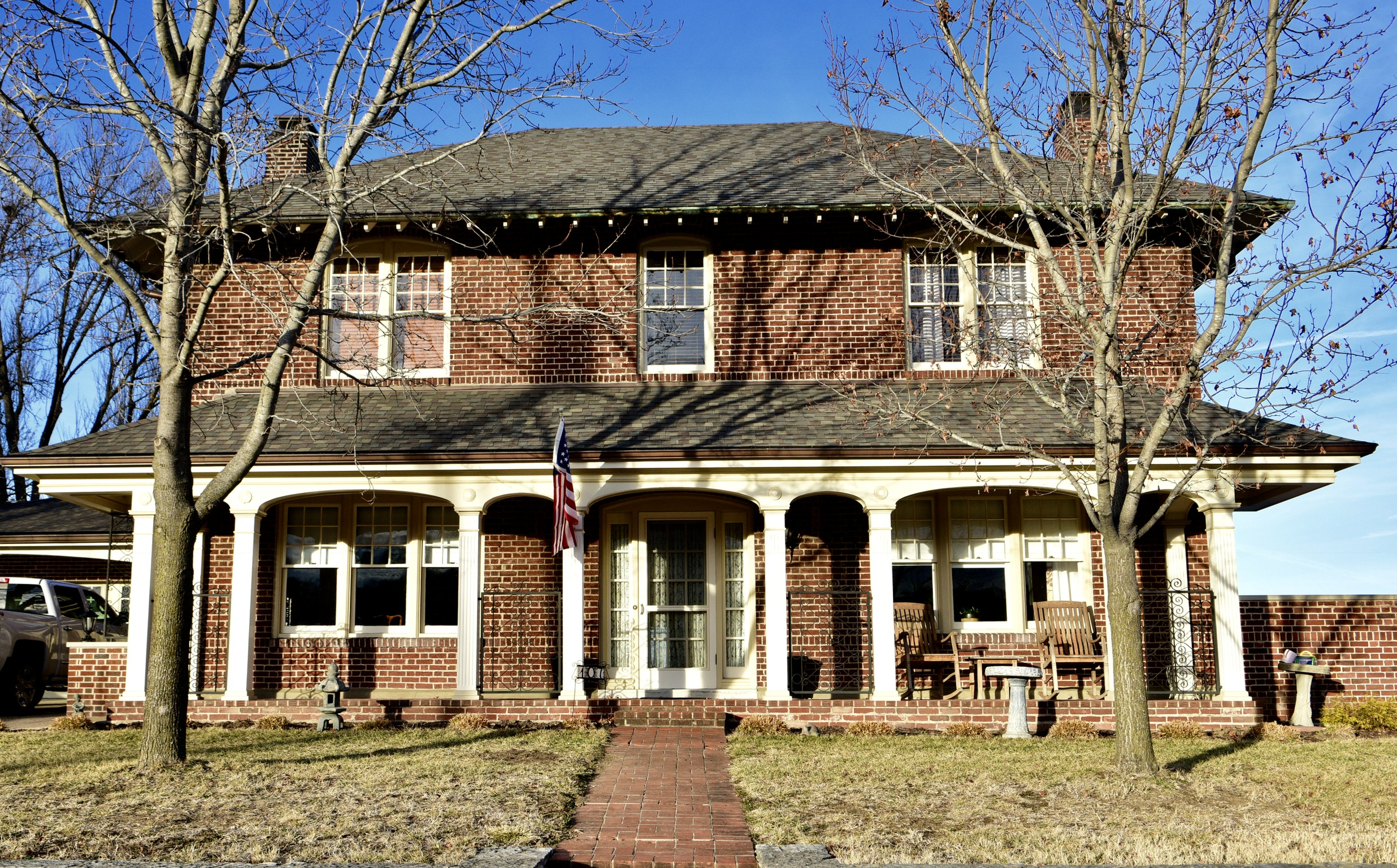
- Edward Hebber House

- Location within Missouri Location within the United States
- Location: Roughly along Wall St. and Maupin Ave., and bounded by Washington and Bates Sts., New Haven, Missouri
- Coordinates: 38°36′47″N 91°12′57″W
- Area: 5.5 acres (2.2 ha)
- Built: 1857
- Architectural style: Italianate, Queen Anne, Colonial Revival, Bungalow/craftsman
- NRHP reference No.: 99000661
- Added to NRHP: June 3, 1999

New Haven Residential Historic District is a national historic district located at New Haven, Franklin County, Missouri. The district encompasses 26 contributing buildings a predominantly residential section of New Haven. The district developed between about 1857 and 1945, and includes representative examples of Italianate, Queen Anne, Colonial Revival, and Bungalow / American Craftsman style architecture. Notable buildings include the Langenberg Hat Factory (c. 1890), William H. Otto Furniture Store (c. 1881), Central Hotel (c. 1885), Dr. John S. Leewright House (1857), Lillie Patton House, Richard Schure House, George Wolff Sr. House (1880), Edward Hebbeler House (1916), and Emil Wolff House.

It was listed on the National Register of Historic Places in 1999.
