= Maj. Gen. William S. Harney Summer Home =

Historic house in Missouri, United States

- U.S. National Register of Historic Places
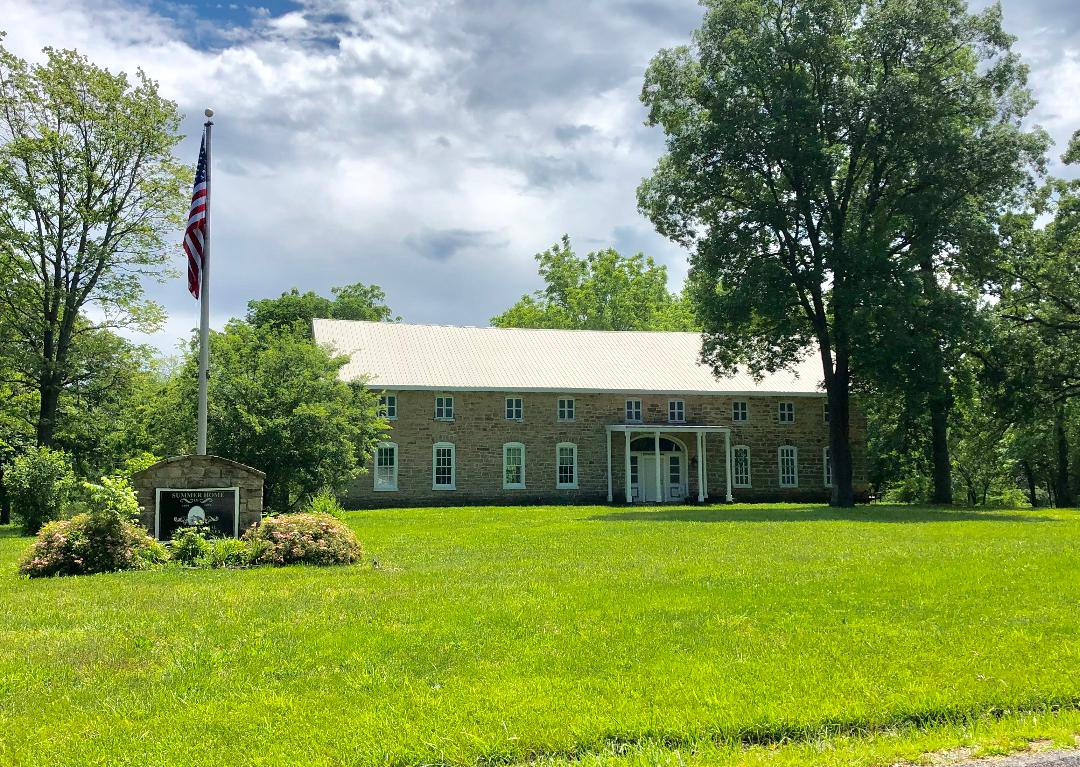

- Location within Missouri Location within the United States
- Location: 332 S. Mansion Ave., Sullivan, Missouri
- Coordinates: 38°12′13″N 91°9′48″W
- Area: 2.3 acres (0.93 ha)
- Built: 1856, 1869-1872
- NRHP reference No.: 84002144
- Added to NRHP: April 19, 1984

Maj. Gen. William S. Harney Summer Home, also known as the Harney Mansion, is a historic home located at Sullivan, Crawford County, Missouri. It was built in 1856, and is a 1 3/4-story, eclectic dwelling constructed of native brown sandstone. The house has a rear wing added between 1869 and 1872. It was the summer home of William S. Harney, who purchased it in 1869.

It is operated as a historic house museum.

It was listed on the National Register of Historic Places in 1984.
