= Elvin Mesger =

American ten-pin bowler

Elvin Earl Mesger (March 24, 1916, Rosebud, Missouri – October 14, 2001, Sullivan, Missouri) was an American bowler, holder of the American Bowling Congress record for 800-or-better series (15). He also held the record (since broken) for most sanctioned perfect games, with an entry in the Guinness Book of World Records; between 1958 and 1974, he had 27. He scored his 13th, 14th and 15th perfect games in one day—a first for the ABC—then rolled four more 300s in three weeks.

Since 1985, Elvin Mesger's name had often been the subject of a question in each spring Almaniac World Trivia Contest based on The World Almanac And Book of Facts until the contest ended permanently in 2022.
