= Christopher and Johanna Twelker Farm =

Historic house in Missouri, United States

- U.S. National Register of Historic Places
- Location within Missouri Location within the United States
- Location: 4749 MO 185, near New Haven, Missouri
- Coordinates: 38°29′59″N 91°10′34″W
- Area: 62 acres (25 ha)
- Built: 1871
- Built by: Wolff, Charles
- Architectural style: I-House
- NRHP reference No.: 16000748
- Added to NRHP: November 2, 2016

Christopher and Johanna Twelker Farm is a historic home and farm located near New Haven, Franklin County, Missouri. The farmhouse was built by German immigrants in 1871, and is a two-story, five-bay, stone I-house with a 1 1/2-story rear ell. Also on the property are the contributing gambrel-roofed frame barn (c. 1910) and a small frame summer kitchen (c. 1910).

It was listed on the National Register of Historic Places in 2016.
