= Kiel, Missouri =

Unincorporated community in Missouri, U.S.

Coordinates: 38°31′18″N 91°14′38″W

Kiel is an unincorporated community in northwest Franklin County, in the U.S. state of Missouri.

The community is on Missouri Route C approximately six miles south of New Haven.

== History ==
A post office called Kiel was established in 1883, and remained in operation until 1909. The community takes its name from Kiel, in Germany, the native home of a large share of the first settlers.
