= Negro Masonic Hall =

- U.S. National Register of Historic Places
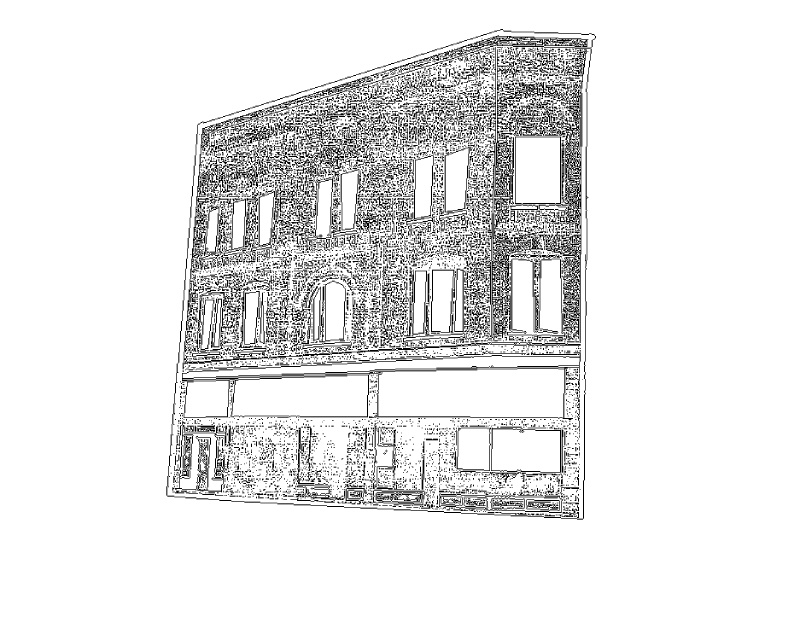

- Location within St. Louis Location within Missouri Location within the United States
- Location: 3615--3619 Dr. Martin Luther King Blvd., St. Louis, Missouri
- Coordinates: 38°38′49″N 90°13′37″W
- Area: less than one acre
- Built: 1886
- Architectural style: Romanesque
- NRHP reference No.: 93000262
- Added to NRHP: April 15, 1993

The Negro Masonic Hall in St. Louis, Missouri (also known as the Prince Hall Grand Lodge #2) was a historic building built in 1886. Originally constructed as a commercial building, it was purchased by the Most Worshipful Prince Hall Grand Lodge of Missouri (a Masonic Grand Lodge) in 1909 and remodeled as a meeting hall. While the Grand Lodge itself moved to a new location in 1951, several of its subordinate lodges continued to meet in the building until the 1986s. At this point the building was abandoned and deteriorated.

The building was listed on the National Register of Historic Places in 1993. It was demolished after a devastating fire in 1995.
