= Jefferson City Community Center =

- U.S. National Register of Historic Places
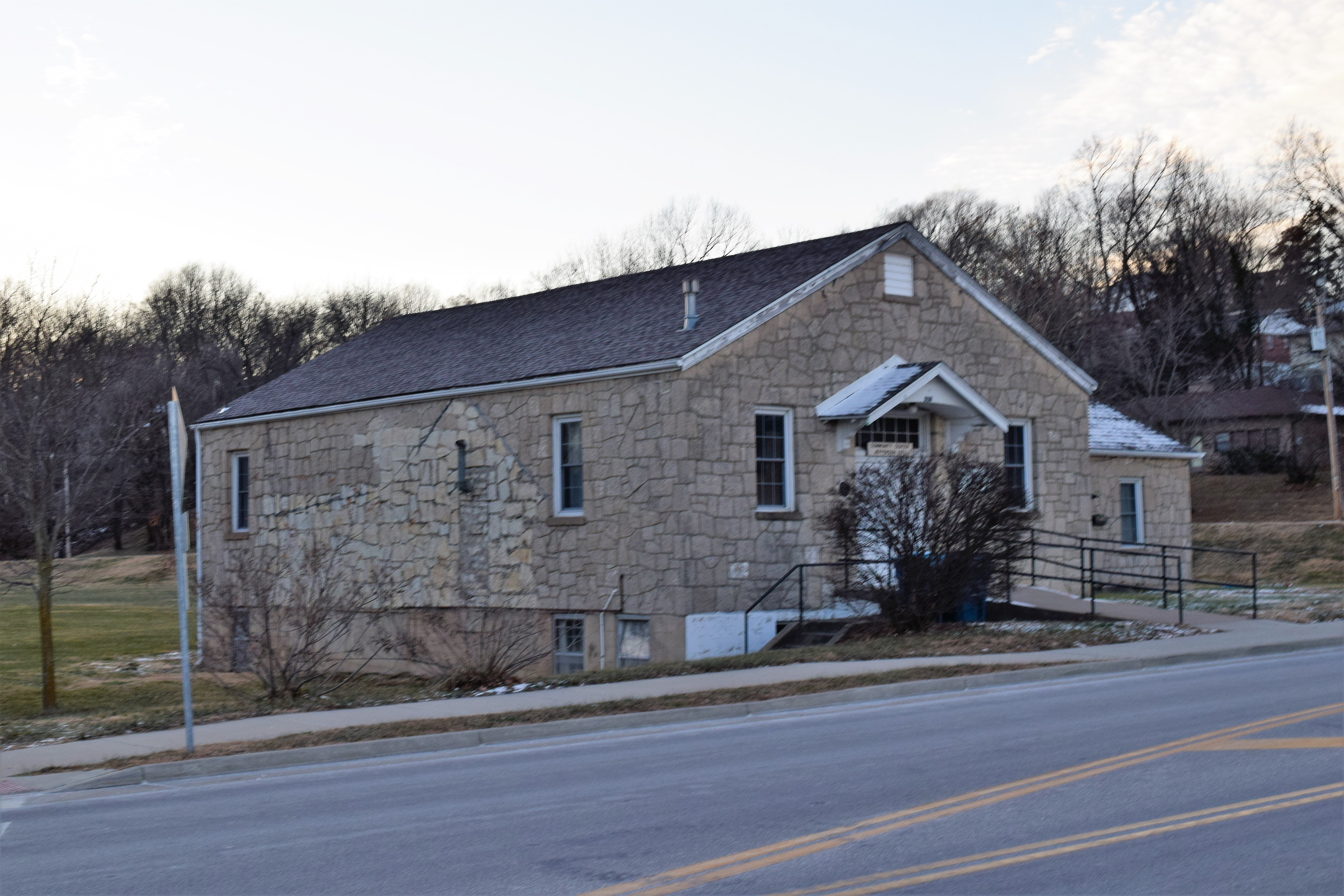

- Location within Missouri Location within the United States
- Interactive map showing the location for Jefferson City Community Center
- Location: 608 E. Dunklin St., Jefferson City, Missouri
- Coordinates: 38°34′4″N 92°10′12″W
- Area: less than one acre
- Built: 1942
- Architect: Cooper, Rolland; Diggs, Duke
- NRHP reference No.: 92000503
- Added to NRHP: May 14, 1992

Jefferson City Community Center, also known as Duke Diggs Community Center, is a historic African-American community centre located at Jefferson City, Cole County, Missouri. It was built in 1942, and is a one-story, "T"-plan, stone building.

It was listed on the National Register of Historic Places in 1992.
