= Second Christian Church (Columbia, Missouri) =

Historic church in Missouri, United States

- U.S. National Register of Historic Places
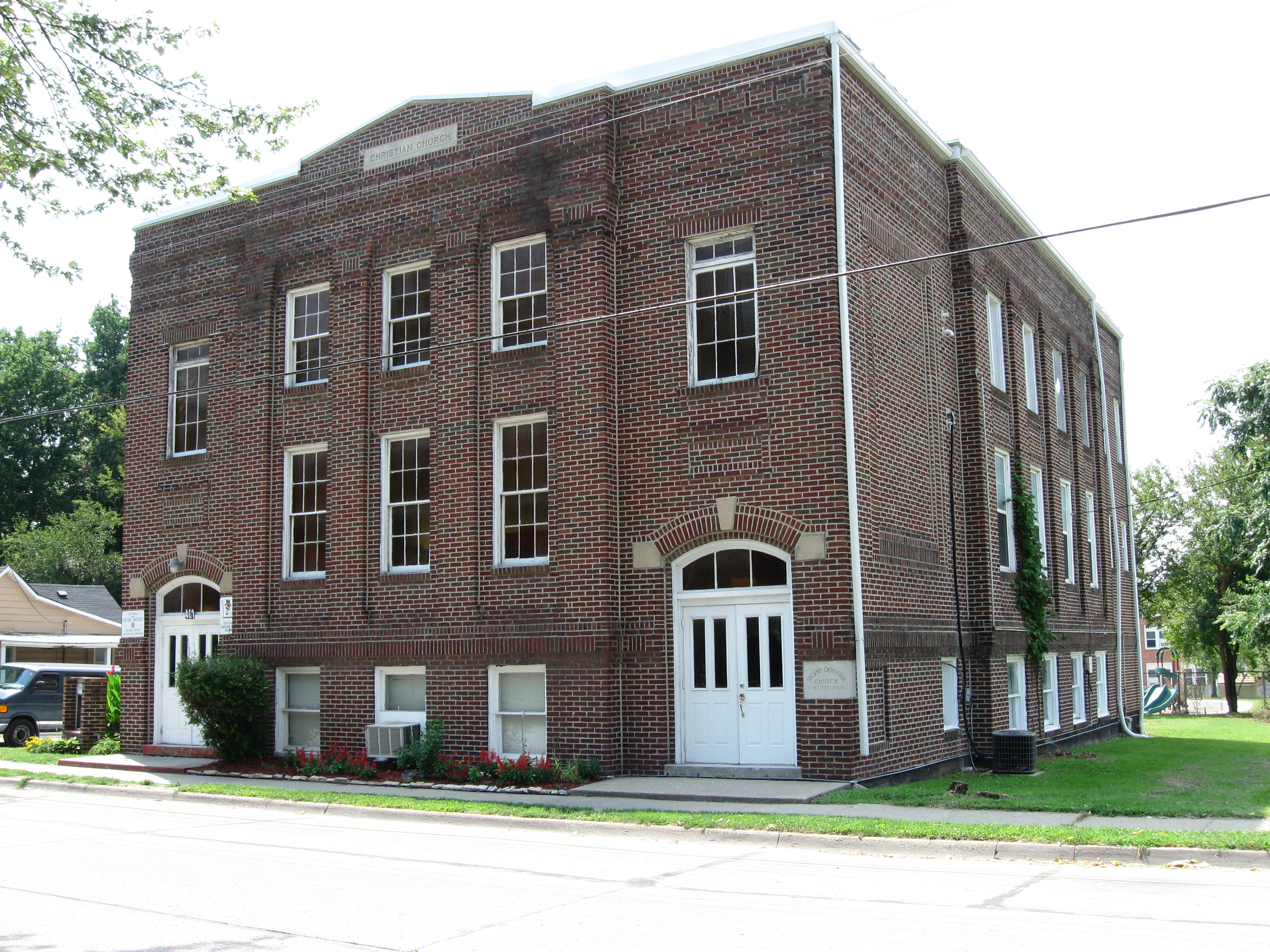

- Location within Missouri Location within the United States
- Location: 401 N. 5th, Columbia, Missouri
- Coordinates: 38°57′20″N 92°19′55″W
- Area: less than one acre
- Built: 1927
- Architectural style: Eclectic
- MPS: Social Institutions of Columbia's Black Community TR
- NRHP reference No.: 80002314
- Added to NRHP: September 4, 1980

Second Christian Church is a historic African-American church located at 401 N. 5th, Columbia, Missouri. It was built in 1927, and is in an eclectic architectural style. It was added to the National Register of Historic Places in 1980.
