= Boeuf Township, Gasconade County, Missouri =

Township in the US state of Missouri

Coordinates: 38.5092°N 91.4314°W

Boeuf Township is an inactive township in Gasconade County, in the U.S. state of Missouri.

Boeuf Township most likely takes its name from Boeuf Creek.
