= AME Church of New Haven =

Historic church in Missouri, United States

- U.S. National Register of Historic Places
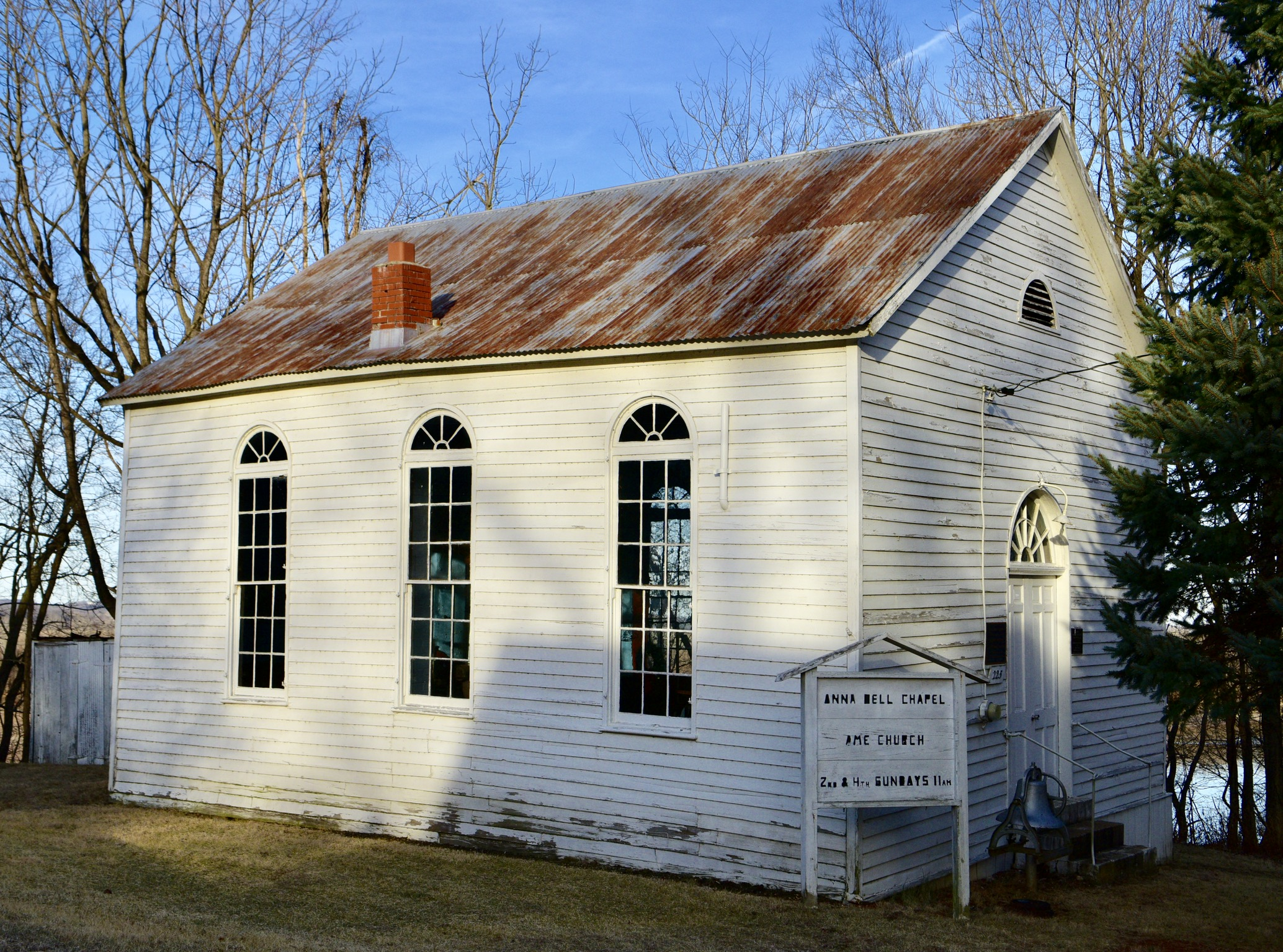

- Location within Missouri Location within the United States
- Location: 225 Selma St. New Haven, Missouri
- Coordinates: 38°36′48″N 91°12′52″W
- Area: less than one acre
- Built: 1893
- Architect: Henry, James; McCullen, Benjamin
- NRHP reference No.: 92001002
- Added to NRHP: August 18, 1992

AME Church of New Haven is a historic African Methodist Episcopal church located at 225 Selma Street in New Haven, Missouri. The church was built in 1893 for New Haven's AME congregation; founded in 1865, it was one of the first Black churches in the city. Church member Anna Bell campaigned heavily for donations to build the new church building; Bell was also one of the new church's original trustees. After her death, the building was named the Anna Bell Chapel in her honor. The church, located in a predominantly African-American section of New Haven, maintained a congregation of roughly 20 people until 1960; during this time, it also served as a community center for the city's African-American community. After 1960, the church's congregation declined, and by the early 1990s the church had only four members.

The church was added to the National Register of Historic Places in 1992.
