= Adria LeBoeuf =

Evolutionary biologist and neuroscientist

- Born: 1982 (age 43–44); Santa Cruz, California
- Education: The Rockefeller University (Ph.D., 2011)
- Awards: PRIMA
- Scientific career
- Fields: Evolutionary biology, Entomology
- Workplaces: University of Cambridge University of Fribourg

Adria LeBoeuf (born 1982) is an evolutionary biologist and neuroscientist known for her work on the evolution of a social circulatory system. She is currently an Associate Professor at the University of Cambridge, where her laboratory focuses on research at the intersection of protein evolution, collective behavior and the social control of development using social insects as the model system.

== Early life and education ==
LeBoeuf was born in Santa Cruz, California (USA), to parents who are biology researchers. She completed her undergraduate studies at the College of Creative Studies at University of California Santa Barbara in 2003, where she studied the human brain using approaches from biochemistry as well as human behavior and evolutionary psychology. She went on to earn her PhD in neuroscience and biophysics from The Rockefeller University in 2011, where her thesis work focused on the subcellular friction and adhesion within the auditory sensory hair bundle.

== Career ==
=== Early career ===
After completing her doctoral studies, LeBoeuf joined The Center for Integrative Genomics, Department of Ecology and Evolution at University of Lausanne as a Postdoctoral Researcher. During this period, she specialized in animal behavior, which would become foundational for the integrative approaches she would later take in her own laboratory.

In 2019, LeBoeuf established her research group at University of Fribourg as an Assistant Professor before starting a permanent position at the University of Cambridge in 2024.

=== Science communication and theatre ===
Beyond her research, LeBoeuf has been actively involved in science communication and advocacy for women in STEM, with a belief that the culture of science can improve with greater inclusivity and responsible leadership. She is a member of the 500 Women Scientists Bern-Fribourg, an umbrella non-profit organization that supports local networking of female-identifying individuals and gender minorities in science and research.

In 2012, Adria LeBoeuf founded The Catalyst, a Swiss non-profit that teaches scientists to be better communicators through theatre.

== Research ==
=== Major contributions ===
LeBoeuf's research has changed understanding of common social behaviours, highlighting social exchanges (lactation, mating, regurgitation) as battlegrounds for sophisticated molecular mechanisms to regulate development, physiology and fitness. Her work began with identifying specific growth regulator proteins and small molecules transferred between ants during mouth-to-mouth exchanges, providing the first molecular characterisation of these socially exchanged substances, and how they shift with social conditions. This research demonstrated that fluid exchange is not merely for nutrition but serves as a sophisticated, fast evolving regulatory mechanism within insect societies.

=== Current research ===
LeBoeuf's laboratory employs methodologies and techniques from molecular biology, behavioural ecology, and evolutionary biology with a uniquely integrative approach to investigate trophallaxis in ants . Her current research has revealed the profound evolutionary implications of socially transferred materials:

1. "Ecological change and conflict reduction led to a social circulatory system in ants" showed that trophallaxis contributed to net diversification in ants, evolving when worker reproduction became limited, and when ants began consuming sugary liquids during the angiosperm evolution.
2. "Innovation in ant larval feeding facilitated queen–worker divergence and social complexity" revealed that the transition from a predatory to an omnivorous diet spurred social complexity in ants through more controlled larval feeding via social transfers.

Together, these works reveal how the evolution of social fluid exchange has been a key driver in the remarkable success of ants. A full list of LeBoeuf's research articles can be found on her Google Scholar.

=== Awards and recognition ===
Adria LeBoeuf has received numerous awards for her scientific contributions, including the Human Frontiers Science Program to study metabolic division of labour in ant colonies. Her research has received significant press attention, demonstrating both scientific and public interest in her work.

== Personal life ==
LeBoeuf lives in Cambridge, UK with husband Samuel Lagier and their daughter Gaia.
