= Dundee, Missouri =

Unincorporated community in Missouri, U.S.

Coordinates: 38°35′36″N 91°07′29″W

Dundee is an unincorporated community in northern Franklin County, in the U.S. state of Missouri. The community is above the Missouri River floodplain on Missouri Route 100 approximately six miles northwest of Washington and five miles east of New Haven.

== History ==
Dundee was platted in 1857, and named after Dundee, in Scotland, the ancestral home of a first settler. A post office called Dundee was established in 1857, and remained in operation until 1908.
