= Meramec State Park =

State park in Missouri, United States

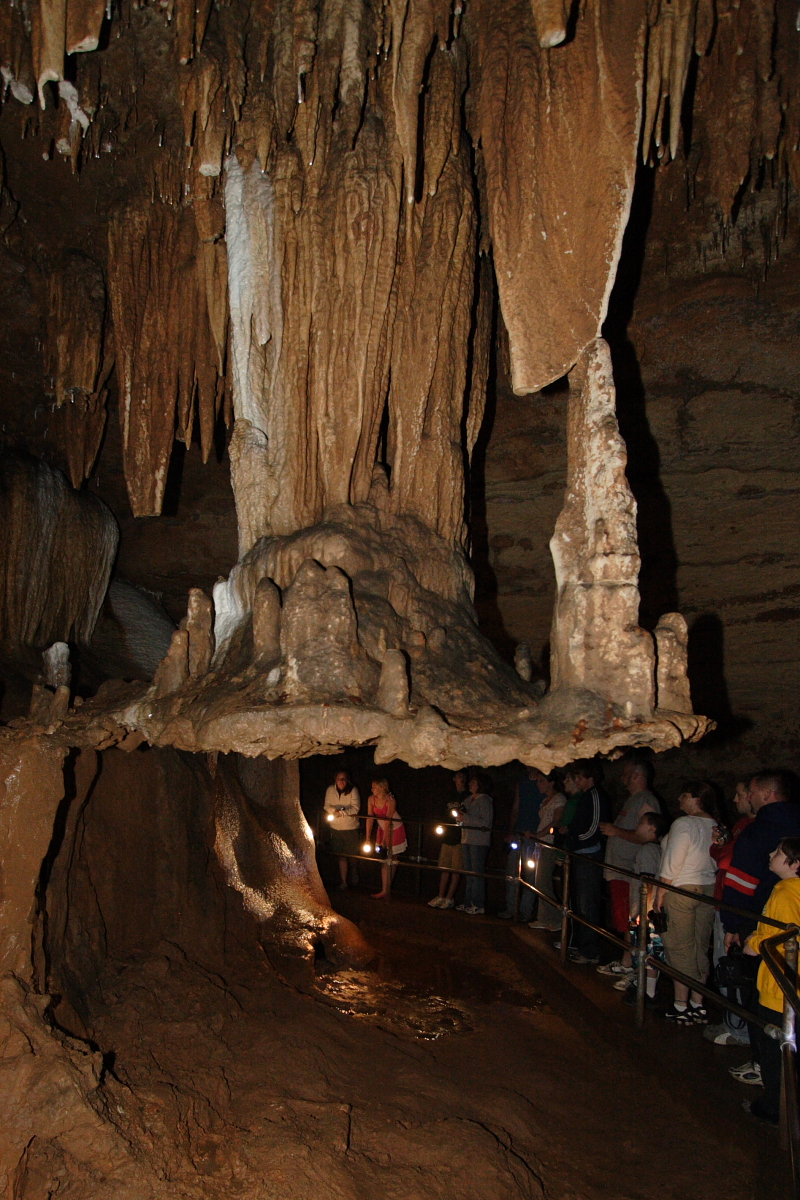
- A stalactiflat in Fisher Cave

- Location within Missouri Location within the United States
- Location: Franklin, Crawford, and Washington counties, Missouri, United States
- Coordinates: 38°13′00″N 91°04′40″W
- Area: 6,896.33 acres (2,790.85 ha)
- Elevation: 571 ft (174 m)
- Established: 1927
- Administrator: Missouri Department of Natural Resources
- Visitors: 369,762 (in 2023)
- Website: Official website
- Meramec State Park Lookout House/Observation Tower
- U.S. National Register of Historic Places
- Nearest city: Sullivan, Missouri
- Area: Less than one acre
- Built: c. 1934
- Built by: CCC; NPS
- Architectural style: Rustic
- MPS: ECW Architecture in Missouri State Parks 1933-1942 TR
- NRHP reference No.: 85000530
- Added to NRHP: February 28, 1985
- Meramec State Park Pump House
- U.S. National Register of Historic Places
- Nearest city: Sullivan, Missouri
- Area: Less than one acre
- Built: 1934
- Built by: CCC; NPS
- Architectural style: Rustic
- MPS: ECW Architecture in Missouri State Parks 1933-1942 TR
- NRHP reference No.: 85000531
- Added to NRHP: February 28, 1985
- Meramec State Park Shelter House
- U.S. National Register of Historic Places
- Nearest city: Sullivan, Missouri
- Area: Less than one acre
- Built: 1935
- Built by: CCC; NPS
- Architectural style: Rustic
- MPS: ECW Architecture in Missouri State Parks 1933-1942 TR
- NRHP reference No.: 85000532
- Added to NRHP: February 26, 1985
- Meramec State Park Beach Area Historic District
- U.S. National Register of Historic Places
- U.S. Historic district
- Nearest city: Sullivan, Missouri
- Area: Less than one acre
- Built by: National Park Service
- Architectural style: Rustic
- MPS: ECW Architecture in Missouri State Parks 1933-1942 TR
- NRHP reference No.: 91001772
- Added to NRHP: December 6, 1991

Meramec State Park is a public recreation area located near Sullivan, Missouri, about 60 miles from St. Louis, along the Meramec River. The park has diverse ecosystems such as hardwood forests and glades. There are over 40 caves located throughout the park, the bedrock is dolomite. The most famous is Fisher Cave, located near the campgrounds. The park borders the Meramec Conservation Area.

== History ==
The park was acquired by the state in 1927, then saw active development by the Civilian Conservation Corps (CCC) between 1933 and 1935. At that time, trails were laid out and numerous buildings constructed including a dining hall, recreation hall, concession building, and shelters.

In the late 1970s, as part of the Meramec Basin Project, the U.S. Army Corps of Engineers began work on a dam in the park to impound the river. The resulting reservoir would have permanently flooded much of the park and imperiled many different species, including the endangered Indiana bat. However, in response to direct citizen action against the dam, the project was halted, marking a victory for the environmental movement.

== Historic sites ==
Three surviving CCC-era structures were added to the National Register of Historic Places in 1985:

- Meramec State Park Lookout House/Observation Tower: The rustic-style stone and trussed timber octagonal lookout tower was built about 1934.
- Meramec State Park Pump House: The rustic-style stone pump house (well house) on the Lodge Trail has a medium-pitched front-gable roof with small cupola. It was built in 1934.
- Meramec State Park Shelter House: The rustic-style shelter house on the Lodge Trail measures 12 feet by 16 feet and has a hipped roof supported by heavy wooden posts and brackets. It was built in 1935.

In 1991, the Meramec State Park Beach Area Historic District was also added to the list. The historic district encompasses four contributing buildings, three contributing structures, and one contributing object. They include the picnic shelter, stone restrooms, water fountain, pump house, and stone steps.

The bottom southeast corner of the park includes the old Hamilton Ironworks, after which the Ozarks fiddle tune "Hamilton Ironworks" is named. The Hamilton Iron Works Trail has interpretive signage about the history the blast furnace that once operated "around the clock, seven days a week."

== Activities and amenities ==
In addition to cave tours, the park offers hiking trails, fishing, swimming and boating on the Meramec River, and a campground. The visitor center houses an exhibit hall with a video presentation and information about the history and ecology of the area.
