= Etlah, Missouri =

Unincorporated community in Missouri, U.S.

Coordinates: 38°38′21″N 91°16′36″W

Etlah is an unincorporated community in Franklin County, in the U.S. state of Missouri.

== History ==
A post office called Etlah was established in 1864, and remained in operation until 1935. The name Etlah is the German verb halte (meaning "stop"), spelled backwards.
