= Roark Township, Gasconade County, Missouri =

Inactive township in the US state of Missouri

Coordinates: 38.63°N 91.46°W

Roark Township is an inactive township in Gasconade County, in the U.S. state of Missouri.

Roark Township was established in 1834, taking its name from the local Roark family of pioneer citizens.
