= Lyon, Missouri =

Unincorporated community in Missouri, U.S.

Coordinates: 38°30′42″N 91°10′27″W

Lyon is an unincorporated community in Franklin County, in the U.S. state of Missouri.

== History ==
A post office called Lyon was established in 1879, and remained in operation until 1903. The community most likely takes its name from Lyon Township.
