= Kohl City, Missouri =

Community in Missouri, U.S.

Coordinates: 38°35′54″N 91°21′53″W

Kohl City (also known as Kohl) is community in Franklin County, in the U.S. state of Missouri.

== History ==
A post office called Kohl was established in 1892, and remained in operation until 1903. The community derives its name from the local Kohlbusch family.
