= Marc Boeuf =

French politician (1934–1993)

Marc Boeuf (January 8, 1934 – August 27, 1993) was a French politician.

== Biography ==
Marc Boeuf, the son of a paper worker and militant communist, was born in the Bacalan district of Bordeaux at the beginning of 1934. He worked as a teacher. He was active in secular and associative works and notably sets up the theater section of the "Dupaty" patronage in Bordeaux.

He was mobilized in May 1958 in Algeria and devoted himself to the literacy of harkis.

He was president of the Departmental Council of parents of pupils of the Gironde, departmental director of the Mutuelle générale de l'Éducation nationale (MGEN) and president of the National Council of secular family associations in 1988.

== Local mandates ==
- 1973–1976: General Councilor of the canton of Bordeaux-1
- 1976–1982: General Councilor of the canton of Bordeaux-1
- 1982–1988: General Councilor of the canton of Bordeaux-1
- 1988 – August 27, 1993: General Councilor of the canton of Bordeaux-1
- 1979–1986: Regional Councilor of Aquitaine

== Parliamentary mandates ==
- September 28, 1980 – September 24, 1989: Senator of Gironde
- September 24, 1989 – August 27, 1993: Senator of Gironde
