= Sullivan, Missouri =

- City
- City of Sullivan
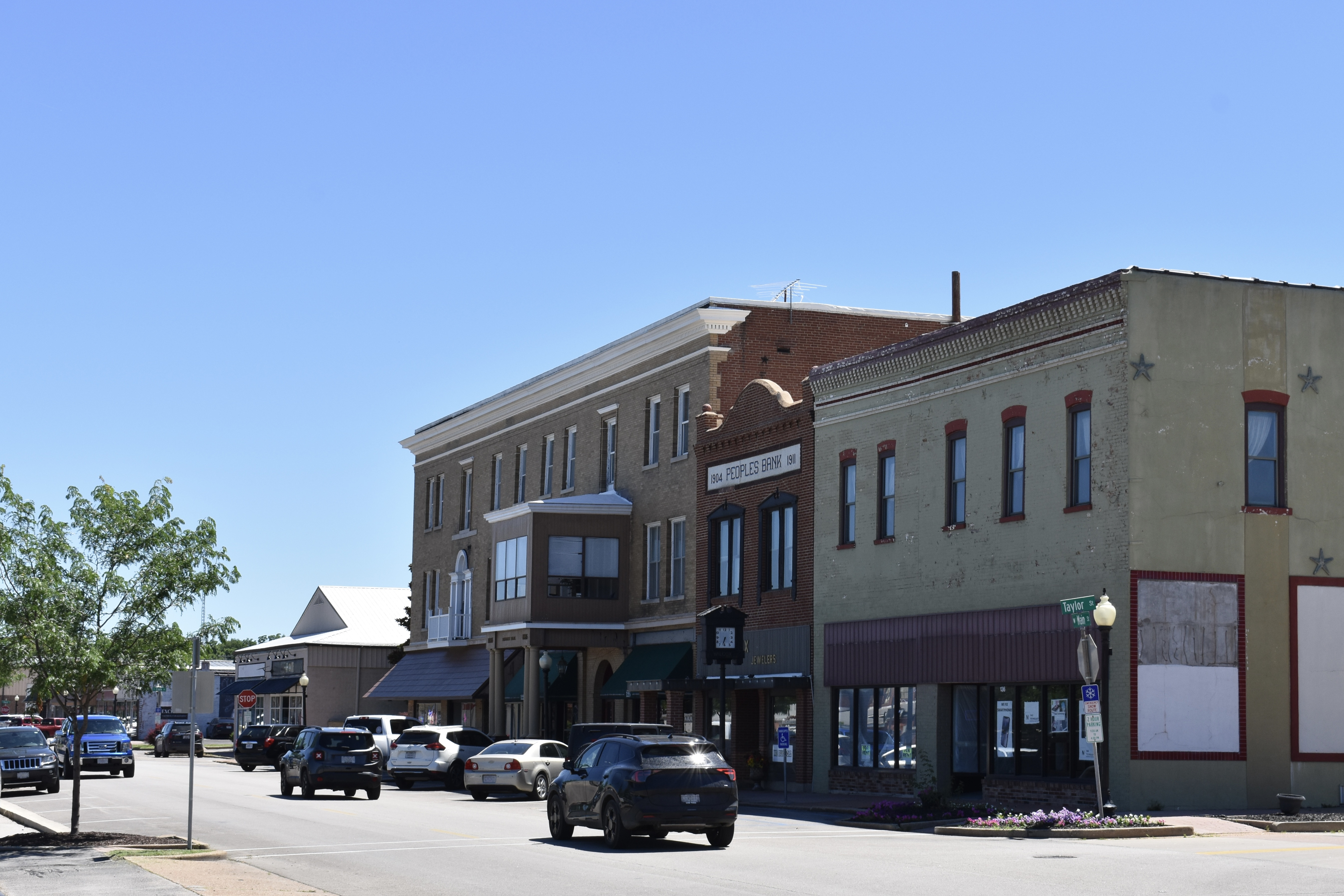
- Downtown Sullivan

- Location of Sullivan, Missouri
- Coordinates: 38°12′46″N 91°09′49″W
- Country: United States
- State: Missouri
- Counties: Franklin, Crawford
- Founded: 1856
- Incorporated: 1883
- Named for: Stephen Sullivan

Government
  - Mayor: Dennis Watz
  - City Clerk: Jan Koch
  - City Administrator: J.T. Hardy

Area
  - Total: 8.19 sq mi (21.21 km^{2})
  - Land: 8.19 sq mi (21.21 km^{2})
  - Water: 0 sq mi (0.00 km^{2})
- Elevation: 974 ft (297 m)

Population (2020)
  - Total: 6,906
  - Density: 843.3/sq mi (325.59/km^{2})
- Time zone: UTC-6 (Central (CST))
  - Summer (DST): UTC-5 (CDT)
- ZIP Code: 63080
- Area code: 573
- FIPS code: 29-71440
- GNIS feature ID: 2395998
- Website: www.sullivan.mo.us

Sullivan is a city that straddles the border of Franklin and Crawford counties in the U.S. state of Missouri. The population was 6,906 at the 2020 census.

== History ==
On January 28, 1839, 120 acres were conveyed by the U.S. Government to Garretson (also spelled Garrison) P. Hardy. Purchased according to provisions of the Act of Congress for the sale of public lands (dated April 1820). Then in June 1848, Garretson sold the acreage to William & Mary Smith for $150. In June 1856, Stephen & Dorcas Sullivan purchased the acreage, plus an additional 49 acres from Smith for the sum of $400. This was the future site of the original town. On July 25, 1856, when a post office was established in present-day Sullivan, the local postmaster named the place "Mount Helicon". This short-lived name was after an actual mountain in Greece that was the mythical sanctuary of the Muses. In 1859, Stephen Sullivan donated ground for railroad right-of-way and built the depot himself. The railroad named the station “Sullivan” prompting the post office to change to Sullivan.

Between 1920 and 1960, the city grew from 900 to more than 4,000 residents, making Sullivan the second fastest-growing city in the state during that time.

The Maj. Gen. William S. Harney Summer Home was listed on the National Register of Historic Places in 1984.

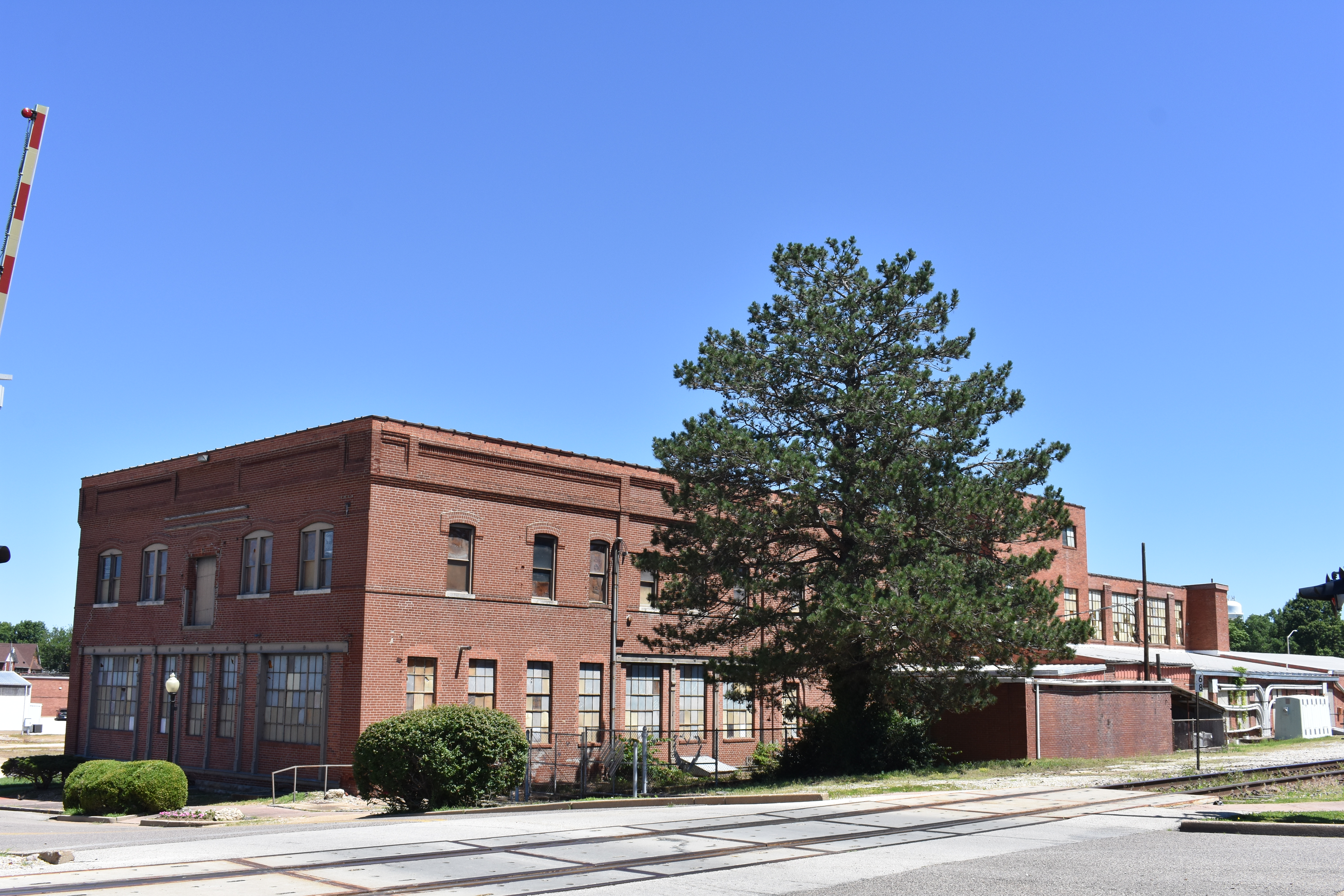
International Shoe Company Building

== Geography ==
Sullivan is located on the Franklin-Crawford county line at the intersection of Interstate 44 and Missouri Route 185. The Meramec River flows through Meramec State Park just to the east of the city.

According to the United States Census Bureau, the city has a total area of 8.2 square miles (21.24 km^{2}), all land.

== Government ==
Governed by a Mayor and six members of the Board of Aldermen and assisted by a City Administrator, the City oversees a budget of $25 million. The City of Sullivan provides services in the areas of electric distribution, water, sewer, streets, aviation, parks and recreation, engineering, economic development, solid waste collection and law enforcement with a total of 60 full-time employees. The city operates on a very solid financial basis as demonstrated in its reserves. The local tax levy of 43.39 cents and utility rates are among the lowest in the area. A two cent sales tax for general revenue, capital improvements, and transportation provides the largest revenue source.

The Board of Aldermen meets at 7:00 p.m. on the first and third Tuesday of each month. The Board relies on the aid and counsel of numerous boards and commissions, including the Planning & Zoning, Airport Board, Industrial Development Authority and Board of Adjustment that meet as needed. The Planning and Zoning Commission meets on the second Tuesday of each month at 7:00 p.m.

== Demographics ==
Historical population
| Census | Pop. | Note | %± |
|---|---|---|---|
| 1880 | 155 | | — |
| 1900 | 714 | | — |
| 1910 | 934 | | 30.8% |
| 1920 | 909 | | −2.7% |
| 1930 | 2,013 | | 121.5% |
| 1940 | 2,517 | | 25.0% |
| 1950 | 3,019 | | 19.9% |
| 1960 | 4,098 | | 35.7% |
| 1970 | 5,111 | | 24.7% |
| 1980 | 5,461 | | 6.8% |
| 1990 | 5,661 | | 3.7% |
| 2000 | 6,351 | | 12.2% |
| 2010 | 7,081 | | 11.5% |
| 2020 | 6,906 | | −2.5% |
U.S. Decennial Census

As late as 1990, Sullivan allegedly had a sundown town sign warning Blacks against being present in Sullivan after dark. While Missouri is 11.6% Black according to the US census definition, in the 2010 census 0.2% of the population of Sullivan was Black. In 2014, a group of 15 white schoolgirls blackened their faces for a game of powderpuff football, prompting national media coverage. A few months prior, as protests took place in Ferguson, MO after the police killing of Michael Brown, the KKK held a rally in the Sullivan area, prompting the town's mayor to write a formal denouncement of racial bigotry in the area. Attempting to overcome past prejudices, the Sullivan Chamber of Commerce selected Stefan Wehmeyer, an African American, as the community's 2017 Man of the Year. Later that year to open Life House Youth Center, a non-profit youth center that assists children with homework, learning, counseling, socializing, and sports/exercise etc. It has a game room with video and board games along with a fenced off basketball/volleyball court. Amenities and services are open to all children between the ages of 10-17 free of charge.

As of 2024, Tougaloo College maintains Sullivan's listing as a sundown town. However, the college's assessment reads that Sullivan is "probably not [still a sundown town], although very few Black people."

=== 2020 census ===
As of the 2020 census, Sullivan had a population of 6,906. The median age was 38.2 years. 23.9% of residents were under the age of 18 and 18.5% were 65 years of age or older. For every 100 females, there were 91.9 males, and for every 100 females age 18 and over, there were 88.0 males.

92.3% of residents lived in urban areas, while 7.7% lived in rural areas.

There were 2,869 households in Sullivan, of which 29.5% had children under the age of 18 living in them. Of all households, 36.7% were married-couple households, 19.7% were households with a male householder and no spouse or partner present, and 33.3% were households with a female householder and no spouse or partner present. About 33.9% of all households were made up of individuals, and 15.6% had someone living alone who was 65 years of age or older.

There were 3,174 housing units, of which 9.6% were vacant. The homeowner vacancy rate was 3.3% and the rental vacancy rate was 8.9%. The population density was 842.2 inhabitants per square mile (325.2/km^{2}), and housing density was 387.1 per square mile (149.5/km^{2}).

Racial composition as of the 2020 census
| Race | Number | Percent |
|---|---|---|
| White | 6,402 | 92.7% |
| Black or African American | 32 | 0.5% |
| American Indian and Alaska Native | 27 | 0.4% |
| Asian | 37 | 0.5% |
| Native Hawaiian and Other Pacific Islander | 1 | 0.0% |
| Some other race | 60 | 0.9% |
| Two or more races | 347 | 5.0% |
| Hispanic or Latino (of any race) | 138 | 2.0% |

=== 2010 census ===
As of the census of 2010, there were 7,081 people, 2,829 households, and 1,793 families living in the city. The population density was 896.3 inhabitants per square mile (346.1/km^{2}). There were 3,136 housing units at an average density of 397.0 per square mile (153.3/km^{2}). The racial makeup of the city was 97.4% White, 0.2% African American, 0.4% Native American, 0.4% Asian, 0.6% from other races, and 1.0% from two or more races. Hispanic or Latino of any race were 2.2% of the population.

There were 2,829 households, of which 34.3% had children under the age of 18 living with them, 41.9% were married couples living together, 15.7% had a female householder with no husband present, 5.8% had a male householder with no wife present, and 36.6% were non-families. 31.0% of all households were made up of individuals, and 14.4% had someone living alone who was 65 years of age or older. The average household size was 2.44 and the average family size was 3.03.

The median age in the city was 35.6 years. 26.5% of residents were under the age of 18; 9.4% were between the ages of 18 and 24; 25.7% were from 25 to 44; 21.7% were from 45 to 64; and 16.6% were 65 years of age or older. The gender makeup of the city was 47.4% male and 52.6% female.

=== 2000 census ===
As of the census of 2000, there were 6,351 people, 2,585 households, and 1,682 families living in the city. The population density was 828.4 inhabitants per square mile (319.8/km^{2}). There were 2,775 housing units at an average density of 362.0 per square mile (139.8/km^{2}). The racial makeup of the city was 98.38% White, 0.20% African American, 0.20% Native American, 0.55% Asian, 0.05% Pacific Islander, 0.20% from other races, and 0.41% from two or more races. Hispanic or Latino of any race were 1.20% of the population.

There were 2,585 households, out of which 31.6% had children under the age of 18 living with them, 48.3% were married couples living together, 12.8% had a female householder with no husband present, and 34.9% were non-families. 29.9% of all households were made up of individuals, and 15.4% had someone living alone who was 65 years of age or older. The average household size was 2.40 and the average family size was 2.97.

In the city, the population was spread over several age groups: 25.9% under the age of 18, 9.3% from 18 to 24, 27.5% from 25 to 44, 19.5% from 45 to 64, and 17.9% who were 65 years of age or older. The median age was 36 years. For every 100 females, there were 89.7 males. For every 100 females age 18 and over, there were 82.3 males.

The median income for a household in the city was $30,046, and the median income for a family was $36,260. Males had a median income of $29,817 versus $20,385 for females. The per capita income for the city was $17,518. About 6.9% of families and 11.0% of the population were below the poverty line, including 13.7% of those under age 18 and 9.8% of those age 65 or over.

== Education ==
Public education in Sullivan is administered by Sullivan School District, which operates one primary school, one elementary school, one middle school and Sullivan High School.

St. Anthony Catholic School is a private institution which operates for Pre-K through eighth grade.

Sullivan has a public library, a branch of the Scenic Regional Library system.

== Notable people ==
- Jim Bottomley, baseball Hall of Famer
- William S. Harney, 19th-century general
- George Hearst, U.S. Senator from California, father of publishing magnate William Randolph Hearst
- Elvin Mesger, bowler, holder of American Bowling Congress record for 800-or-better series

== Historic places ==
- Major General William S. Harney Summer Home, Nation Register of Historic Places (1984).
- Meramec State Park Beach Area Historic District
- Meramec State Park Lookout House/Observation Tower
- Meramec State Park Pump House
- Meramec State Park Shelter House
- Historic Route 66

== See also ==
- List of sundown towns in the United States
