= Leboeuf Creek (Missouri) =

River in Missouri, United States

Leboeuf Creek is a stream in Osage County of central Missouri. It is a tributary of the Gasconade River.

The stream headwaters are located at 38°20′24″N 91°47′49″W and the confluence with the Gasconade is at 38°22′39″N 91°49′20″W. The stream source lies just north of Pilot Knob and it runs to the northwest roughly parallel to and southwest of Missouri Route 89. The confluence with the Gasconade is about three-quarters of a mile south of the route 89 bridge.

Leboeuf Creek has the name of the local Lebouef family.

== See also ==
- List of rivers of Missouri
