= Boeuf Creek =

Stream in the US state of Missouri

Boeuf Creek (/bɛf/ BEF or /bʌf/ BUF) is a stream in Franklin and Gasconade counties in the U.S. state of Missouri. Boeuf Creek is a tributary to the Missouri River. Alternate names include Buffalo Creek, Beef Creek, Boeuse Creek, Riviere au Boeuf and variations.

The stream headwaters are in Gasconade County at 38°25′19″N 91°26′34″W and the confluence with the Missouri is in Franklin County at 38°36′00″N 91°08′55″W.

Boeuf Creek was named for the buffalo cows in the area, boeuf being the French word for 'cattle'.

== See also ==
- List of rivers of Missouri
