= New Haven, Missouri =

- City
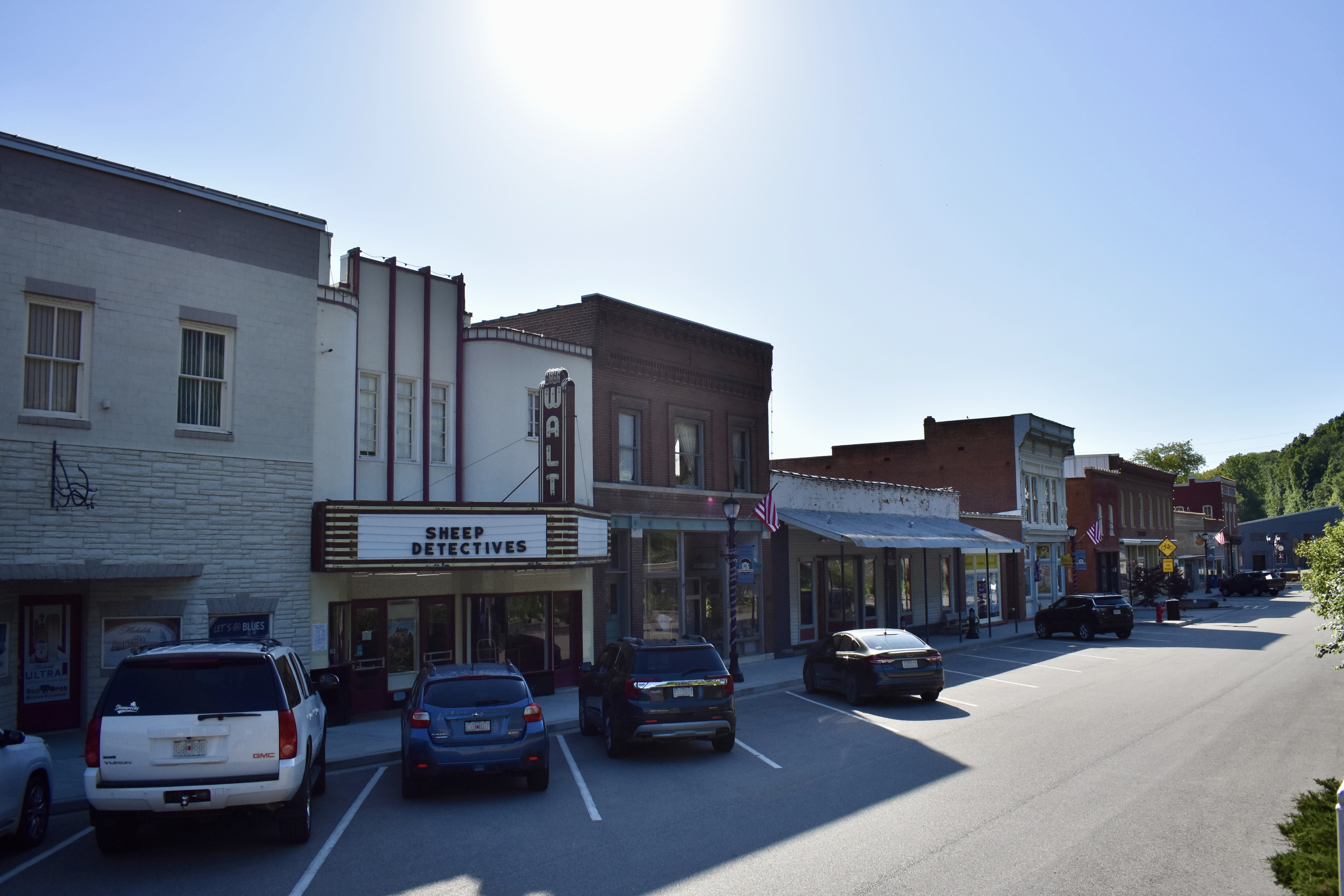
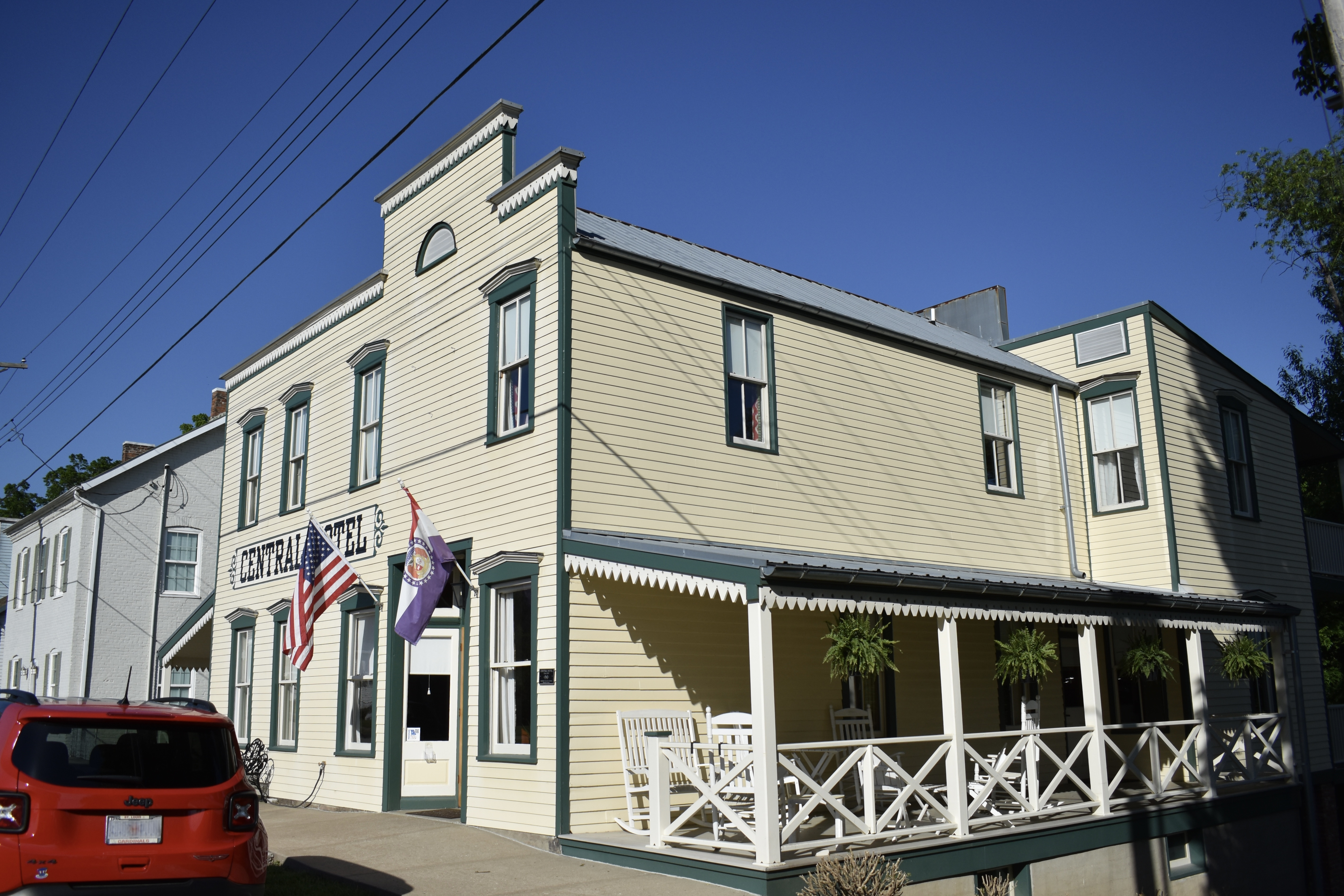
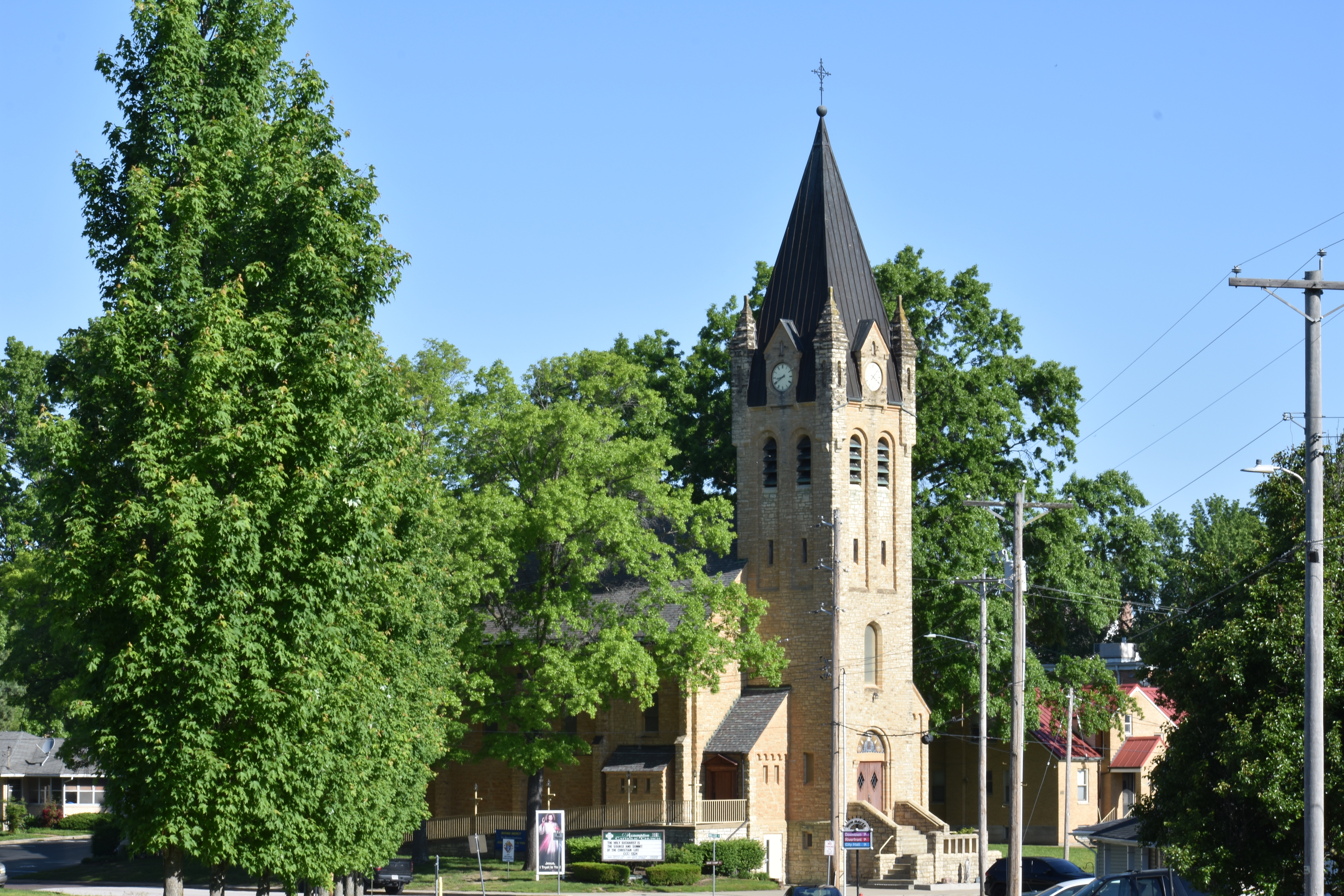
- Downtown New Haven The Central Hotel Assumption Catholic Church
- Nickname: sun drop country
- Location of New Haven, Missouri
- Coordinates: 38°36′17″N 91°13′04″W
- Country: United States
- State: Missouri
- County: Franklin

Area
  - Total: 3.38 sq mi (8.75 km^{2})
  - Land: 3.21 sq mi (8.32 km^{2})
  - Water: 0.16 sq mi (0.42 km^{2})
- Elevation: 669 ft (204 m)

Population (2020)
  - Total: 2,414
  - Density: 751.4/sq mi (290.12/km^{2})
- Time zone: UTC-6 (Central (CST))
  - Summer (DST): UTC-5 (CDT)
- ZIP code: 63068
- Area code: 573
- FIPS code: 29-51914
- GNIS feature ID: 2395200
- Website: www.newhavenmo.org

New Haven is a city in Franklin County, Missouri, United States. The population was 2,414 as of the 2020 census.

New Haven is within the Hermann AVA (American Viticultural Area).

New Haven, Missouri is in the Missouri Rhineland of the United States and a sister city to Borgholzhausen, Germany.

== History ==
New Haven was originally called Miller's Landing, and under the latter name was platted in 1855. A post office called New Haven has been in operation since 1858.

The AME Church of New Haven, New Haven Commercial Historic District, New Haven Residential Historic District, Wilhelm Pelster House-Barn, and Christopher and Johanna Twelker Farm are listed on the National Register of Historic Places.

One notable resident of the New Haven area was Herman Otten (b.1933, d. 2019), pastor of Trinity Lutheran for 55 years. He was the editor of Beck's American Translation and of the Christian News weekly paper.

== Geography ==
The city is located in northwest Franklin County above the Missouri River Valley. Missouri Route 100 is on the south side of the city. Hermann is approximately 13 miles to the northwest and Washington is 11 miles to the east.

According to the United States Census Bureau, the city has a total area of 3.45 square miles (8.94 km^{2}), of which 3.29 square miles (8.52 km^{2}) is land and 0.16 square miles (0.41 km^{2}) is water.

== Demographics ==
Historical population
Census	Pop.	Note	%±
1880	471		—
1890	767		62.8%
1900	883		15.1%
1910	855		−3.2%
1920	805		−5.8%
1930	876		8.8%
1940	1,002		14.4%
1950	1,009		0.7%
1960	1,223		21.2%
1970	1,474		20.5%
1980	1,581		7.3%
1990	1,757		11.1%
2000	1,867		6.3%
2010	2,089		11.9%
2020	2,414		15.6%
U.S. Decennial Census

=== 2020 census ===
As of the 2020 census, New Haven had a population of 2,414. The median age was 37.1 years. 24.9% of residents were under the age of 18 and 19.8% of residents were 65 years of age or older. For every 100 females there were 84.3 males, and for every 100 females age 18 and over there were 78.7 males age 18 and over.

0.0% of residents lived in urban areas, while 100.0% lived in rural areas.

There were 854 households in New Haven, of which 37.6% had children under the age of 18 living in them. Of all households, 47.8% were married-couple households, 14.6% were households with a male householder and no spouse or partner present, and 28.2% were households with a female householder and no spouse or partner present. About 28.3% of all households were made up of individuals and 13.9% had someone living alone who was 65 years of age or older.

There were 928 housing units, of which 8.0% were vacant. The homeowner vacancy rate was 0.5% and the rental vacancy rate was 3.0%.

Racial composition as of the 2020 census
Race	Number	Percent
White	2,175	90.1%
Black or African American	23	1.0%
American Indian and Alaska Native	7	0.3%
Asian	5	0.2%
Native Hawaiian and Other Pacific Islander	1	0.0%
Some other race	31	1.3%
Two or more races	172	7.1%
Hispanic or Latino (of any race)	76	3.1%

=== 2010 census ===
As of the census of 2010, there were 2,089 people, 818 households, and 533 families living in the city. The population density was 635.0 inhabitants per square mile (245.2/km^{2}). There were 905 housing units at an average density of 275.1 per square mile (106.2/km^{2}). The racial makeup of the city was 95.1% White, 0.7% African American, 0.6% Native American, 0.3% Asian, 1.7% from other races, and 1.6% from two or more races. Hispanic or Latino of any race were 2.1% of the population.

There were 818 households, of which 34.8% had children under the age of 18 living with them, 49.6% were married couples living together, 10.6% had a female householder with no husband present, 4.9% had a male householder with no wife present, and 34.8% were non-families. 30.9% of all households were made up of individuals, and 14% had someone living alone who was 65 years of age or older. The average household size was 2.45 and the average family size was 3.08.

The median age in the city was 36.5 years. 25.9% of residents were under the age of 18; 7.6% were between the ages of 18 and 24; 25.9% were from 25 to 44; 24% were from 45 to 64; and 16.7% were 65 years of age or older. The gender makeup of the city was 46.6% male and 53.4% female.

=== 2000 census ===
As of the census of 2000, there were 1,867 people, 707 households, and 485 families living in the city. The 2010 population has risen to 2,089. The population density was 654.2 inhabitants per square mile (252.6/km^{2}). There were 778 housing units at an average density of 272.6 per square mile (105.3/km^{2}). The racial makeup of the city was 98.02% White, 0.64% African American, 0.27% Native American, and 1.07% from two or more races. Hispanic or Latino of any race were 0.86% of the population.

There were 707 households, out of which 35.4% had children under the age of 18 living with them, 56.0% were married couples living together, 8.9% had a female householder with no husband present, and 31.3% were non-families. 28.6% of all households were made up of individuals, and 13.9% had someone living alone who was 65 years of age or older. The average household size was 2.54 and the average family size was 3.13.

In the city, the population was spread out, with 27.3% under the age of 18, 8.0% from 18 to 24, 29.0% from 25 to 44, 18.6% from 45 to 64, and 17.0% who were 65 years of age or older. The median age was 35 years. For every 100 females, there were 86.1 males. For every 100 females age 18 and over, there were 80.7 males.

The median income for a household in the city was $36,681, and the median income for a family was $45,260. Males had a median income of $35,161 versus $21,108 for females. The per capita income for the city was $16,503. About 2.6% of families and 4.7% of the population were below the poverty line, including 2.4% of those under age 18 and 7.6% of those age 65 or over.

== Education ==
New Haven School District, which covers the vast majority of the city, operates one elementary school, one middle school and New Haven High School.

A piece of New Haven is in the Franklin County R-II School District.

New Haven has a public library, a branch of the Scenic Regional Library system.
