= List of colleges and universities in Missouri =

This is a list of colleges and universities in the U.S. state of Missouri. For the purposes of this list, colleges and universities are defined as accredited, degree-granting, post secondary institutions. There are currently 67 such institutions operating in the state, including thirteen public universities, thirty-nine private 4-year institutions, and thirteen community colleges. In addition, many out-of-state institutions offer courses and degrees at locations in Missouri. Classifications are as defined by the Carnegie Classification of Institutions of Higher Education.

== University of Missouri System ==
The University of Missouri System is a state university system providing centralized administration for four universities, a health care system, an extension program, five research and technology parks, and a University of Missouri Press. More than 64,000 students are currently enrolled at its four campuses. Headquartered in Columbia on the original campus, the extension program provides distance learning and other educational initiatives statewide. The UM System was created in 1963 when the University of Missouri and its offshoot, the Missouri School of Mines and Metallurgy, were combined with the formerly-private University of Kansas City and a newly created campus in suburban St. Louis.

School	Location(s)	Control	Type^{[b]}	Enrollment (Fall 2024)	Founded
University of Missouri	Columbia	Public	Doctoral/very high activity research university	31,543	1839
University of Missouri–Kansas City	Kansas City	Public	Doctoral/high activity research university	14,732	1933
Missouri University of Science and Technology	Rolla	Public	Doctoral/high activity research university	7,154	1870
University of Missouri–St. Louis	St. Louis	Public	Doctoral/high activity research university	14,736	1963

== Public universities ==
School	Location(s)	Control	Type^{[b]}	Enrollment (Fall 2024)	Founded
Harris–Stowe State University	St. Louis	Public	Baccalaureate college	1,002	1857
Lincoln University	Jefferson City	Public	Master's colleges and universities	2,054	1866
Missouri Southern State University	Joplin	Public	Master's colleges and universities	4,147	1937
Missouri State University	Springfield	Public	Doctoral/Professional University	24,360	1905
Missouri Western State University	St. Joseph	Public	Master's colleges and universities	3,716	1915
Northwest Missouri State University	Maryville	Public	Master's colleges and universities	9,152	1905
Southeast Missouri State University	Cape Girardeau	Public	Master's colleges and universities	9,501	1873
Truman State University	Kirksville	Public	Master's colleges and universities	3,664	1867
University of Central Missouri	Warrensburg	Public	Master's colleges and universities	12,857	1871

* Harris Teachers College was the City of St. Louis' teachers college for white students, and Stowe Teachers College was for black students until 1954, when the school board merged the two.

== Private colleges and universities ==
School	Location(s)	Control	Type^{[b]}	Enrollment (Fall 2024)	Founded
Avila University	Kansas City	Private (Roman Catholic)	Baccalaureate college	2,768	1916
Calvary University	Kansas City	Private (Christian)	Baccalaureate college	244	1932
Central Methodist University	Fayette	Private (Methodist)	Baccalaureate college	4,843	1854
City Vision University	Kansas City	Private (Christian)	Baccalaureate college	296	1998
College of the Ozarks	Point Lookout	Private ( Presbyterian)	Baccalaureate college	1,454	1906
Columbia College	Columbia	Private	Master's colleges and universities	5,689	1851
Cottey College	Nevada	Nonsectarian	Baccalaureate college	254	1884
Culver–Stockton College	Canton	Disciples of Christ	Baccalaureate college	1,028	1853
Drury University	Springfield	Private (Christian)	Master's colleges and universities	2,274	1873
Evangel University	Springfield	Private (Assemblies of God)	Baccalaureate college	2,620	1955
Hannibal–LaGrange University	Hannibal	Private (Southern Baptist)	Baccalaureate college	499	1858
Lindenwood University	St. Charles	Private (Presbyterian)	Master's colleges and universities	6,826	1832
Maryville University	Town and Country	Private	Baccalaureate college	9,261	1872
Missouri Baptist University	St. Louis	Private (Southern Baptist)	Baccalaureate college	5,699	1957
Missouri Valley University	Marshall	Private (Presbyterian)	Baccalaureate college	1,770	1889
Park University	Parkville	Private	Master's colleges and universities	5,736	1875
Rockhurst University	Kansas City	Private (Jesuit)	Master's colleges and universities	3,577	1910
Saint Louis University	St. Louis	Private (Jesuit)	Doctoral/very high activity research university	17,059	1818
Southwest Baptist University	Bolivar	Private (Southern Baptist)	Baccalaureate college	2,199	1878
Stephens College	Columbia	Private	Baccalaureate college	568	1833
Urshan University	Wentzville	Private (Christian)	Baccalaureate college	474	1968
Washington University in St. Louis	St. Louis	Private	Doctoral/very high activity research university	16,357	1853
Webster University	Webster Groves	Private	Master's colleges and universities	8,260	1915
Westminster College	Fulton	Private	Baccalaureate college	640	1851
William Jewell College	Liberty	Private	Baccalaureate college	959	1849
William Woods University	Fulton	Private (Disciples of Christ)	Baccalaureate college	2,046	1870

== Associate's (community) colleges ==
=== Public ===
- Crowder College
- East Central College
- Jefferson College
- Metropolitan Community College
- Mineral Area College
- Missouri State University–West Plains
- Moberly Area Community College
- North Central Missouri College
- Ozarks Technical Community College
- St. Charles Community College
- St. Louis Community College
- State Fair Community College
- State Technical College of Missouri
- Three Rivers Community College

=== Private ===
- Ranken Technical College
- Texas County Technical College

== Theological seminaries ==
- Aquinas Institute of Theology
- Central Bible University
- Conception Seminary College
- Concordia Seminary
- Covenant Theological Seminary
- Eden Theological Seminary
- Kenrick-Glennon Seminary
- Midwestern Baptist Theological Seminary
- Midwest University
- Mission University
- Nazarene Theological Seminary
- Ozark Christian College
- Urshan Graduate School of Theology

== Special focus ==
- A. T. Still University
- Bolivar Technical College
- Bryan University
- Chamberlain University
- Concorde Career College
- Cox College
- Goldfarb School of Nursing at Barnes-Jewish College
- Kansas City Art Institute
- Kansas City University
- Logan University
- Midwest Institute
- Pinnacle Career Institute
- Ponce Health Sciences University
- Research College of Nursing
- Southeast Missouri Hospital College of Nursing and Health Sciences
- St. Louis College of Health Careers
- Stevens Institute of Business and Arts
- University of Health Sciences and Pharmacy in St. Louis
- WellSpring School of Allied Health

== Defunct institutions ==
- Assemblies of God Theological Seminary (1972–2010; merged with Evangel University)
- Central Bible College (1922–2013)
- Central Female College (1869–1924)
- Fontbonne University (1923–2025)
- Lincoln and Lee University (1927–1933)
- Marion College, one of Missouri's oldest colleges, closed in 1844
- St. Louis Christian College (1956–2022)
- Wentworth Military Academy and College (1880–2017), Lexington

== See also ==
- List of college athletic programs in Missouri
- Higher education in the United States
- List of American institutions of higher education
- List of recognized higher education accreditation organizations
