= List of college athletic programs in Missouri =

This is a list of college athletic programs in the U.S. state of Missouri.

== NCAA ==
=== Division I ===
Full NCAA Division I member colleges in Missouri.
– FBS Football, – FCS Football, – Non-football

Team	School	City	Conference	Sport sponsorship								
Team	School	City	Conference	Foot- ball	Basketball		Base- ball	Soft- ball	Ice hockey		Soccer	
Team	School	City	Conference	Foot- ball	M	W	Base- ball	Soft- ball	M	W	M	W
Kansas City Roos	University of Missouri–Kansas City	Kansas City	Summit	No	Yes	Yes	No	Yes	No	No	Yes	Yes
Lindenwood Lions and Lady Lions	Lindenwood University	St. Charles	Ohio Valley	FCS	Yes	Yes	Yes	Yes	Yes (Note: Lindenwood's men's ice hockey team competes as an independent, and its women's ice hockey team competes as a member of Atlantic Hockey America.)	Yes	Yes	Yes
Missouri Tigers	University of Missouri	Columbia	SEC	FBS	Yes	Yes	Yes	Yes	No	No	No	Yes
Missouri State Bears and Lady Bears	Missouri State University	Springfield	CUSA	FBS	Yes	Yes	Yes	Yes	No	No	Yes	Yes
Saint Louis Billikens	Saint Louis University	St. Louis	Atlantic 10	No	Yes	Yes	Yes	Yes	No	No	Yes	Yes
Southeast Missouri State Redhawks	Southeast Missouri State University	Cape Girardeau	Ohio Valley	FCS	Yes	Yes	Yes	Yes	No	No	No	Yes

=== Division II ===
Full NCAA Division II member colleges in Missouri.
– Football, – Non-football

Team	School	City	Conference	Sport sponsorship						
Team	School	City	Conference	Foot- ball	Basketball		Base- ball	Soft- ball	Soccer	
Team	School	City	Conference	Foot- ball	M	W	Base- ball	Soft- ball	M	W
Central Missouri Mules and Jennies	University of Central Missouri	Warrensburg	MIAA	Yes	Yes	Yes	Yes	Yes	No	Yes
Drury Panthers	Drury University	Springfield	Great Lakes Valley	No	Yes	Yes	Yes	Yes	Yes	Yes
Lincoln Blue Tigers	Lincoln University of Missouri	Jefferson City	Great Lakes Valley	Yes	Yes	Yes	Yes	Yes	Yes	Yes
Maryville Saints	Maryville University	Town and Country	Great Lakes Valley	No	Yes	Yes	Yes	Yes	Yes	Yes
Missouri S&T Miners	Missouri University of Science and Technology	Rolla	Great Lakes Valley	Yes	Yes	Yes	Yes	Yes	Yes	Yes
Missouri Southern Lions	Missouri Southern State University	Joplin	MIAA	Yes	Yes	Yes	Yes	Yes	No	Yes
Missouri Western Griffons	Missouri Western State University	St. Joseph	MIAA	Yes	Yes	Yes	Yes	Yes	No	Yes
Northwest Missouri State Bearcats	Northwest Missouri State University	Maryville	MIAA	Yes	Yes	Yes	Yes	Yes	No	Yes
Rockhurst Hawks	Rockhurst University	Kansas City	Great Lakes Valley	No	Yes	Yes	Yes	Yes	Yes	Yes
Southwest Baptist Bearcats	Southwest Baptist University	Bolivar	Great Lakes Valley	Yes	Yes	Yes	Yes	Yes	Yes	Yes
Truman Bulldogs	Truman State University	Kirksville	Great Lakes Valley	Yes	Yes	Yes	Yes	Yes	Yes	Yes
UMSL Tritons	University of Missouri–St. Louis	St. Louis	Great Lakes Valley	No	Yes	Yes	Yes	Yes	Yes	Yes
William Jewell Cardinals	William Jewell College	Liberty	Great Lakes Valley	Yes	Yes	Yes	Yes	Yes	Yes	Yes

=== Division III ===
Full NCAA Division III member colleges in Missouri.
– Football, – Non-football

Team	School	City	Conference	Sport sponsorship						
Team	School	City	Conference	Foot- ball	Basketball		Base- ball	Soft- ball	Soccer	
Team	School	City	Conference	Foot- ball	M	W	Base- ball	Soft- ball	M	W
Washington University Bears	Washington University in St. Louis	St. Louis	UAA	Yes (Note: Washington University's football team competes in the College Conference of Illinois and Wisconsin.)	Yes	Yes	Yes	Yes	Yes	Yes
Webster Gorloks	Webster University	Webster Groves	St. Louis	No	Yes	Yes	Yes	Yes	Yes	Yes
Westminster Blue Jays	Westminster College	Fulton	St. Louis	Yes (Note: Westminster's football team competes in the Upper Midwest Athletic Conference.)	Yes	Yes	Yes	Yes	Yes	Yes

== NAIA ==
Full NAIA member colleges in Missouri.
– Football, – Non-Football, – Women's Flag Football

Team	School	City	Conference	Sport sponsorship						
Team	School	City	Conference	Foot- ball	Basketball		Base- ball	Soft- ball	Soccer	
Team	School	City	Conference	Foot- ball	M	W	Base- ball	Soft- ball	M	W
Avila Eagles	Avila University	Kansas City	Kansas	Yes	Yes	Yes	Yes	Yes	Yes	Yes
Central Methodist Eagles	Central Methodist University	Fayette	Heart of America	Yes	Yes	Yes	Yes	Yes	Yes	Yes
College of the Ozarks Bobcats	College of the Ozarks	Point Lookout	Sooner	No	Yes	Yes	Yes	No	No	No
Columbia Cougars	Columbia College	Columbia	American Midwest	No	Yes	Yes	Yes	Yes	Yes	Yes
Cottey Comets	Cottey College	Nevada	American Midwest	(Note: Cottey sponsors flag football as a women's varsity sport and competes in the Kansas Collegiate Athletic Conference.)	No	Yes	No	Yes	No	No
Culver–Stockton Wildcats	Culver–Stockton College	Canton	Heart of America	Yes	Yes	Yes	Yes	Yes	Yes	Yes
Evangel Valor	Evangel University	Springfield	Kansas	Yes	Yes	Yes	Yes	Yes	Yes	Yes
Hannibal–LaGrange Trojans	Hannibal–LaGrange University	Hannibal	American Midwest	No	Yes	Yes	Yes	Yes	Yes	Yes
Harris–Stowe State Hornets	Harris–Stowe State University	St. Louis	American Midwest	No	Yes	Yes	Yes	Yes	Yes	Yes
Mission Patriots	Mission University	Springfield	American Midwest	No	Yes	Yes	Yes	Yes	Yes	Yes
Missouri Baptist Spartans	Missouri Baptist University	St. Louis	Heart of America	Yes	Yes	Yes	Yes	Yes	Yes	Yes
Missouri Valley Vikings	Missouri Valley University	Marshall	Heart of America	Yes	Yes	Yes	Yes	Yes	Yes	Yes
Park Pirates	Park University	Parkville	Heart of America	No	Yes	Yes	Yes	Yes	Yes	Yes
UHSP Eutectics	University of Health Sciences and Pharmacy in St. Louis	St. Louis	American Midwest	No	Yes	Yes	Yes	Yes	Yes	Yes
Stephens Stars	Stephens College	Columbia	American Midwest	No	No	Yes	No	Yes	No	Yes
William Woods Owls	William Woods University	Fulton	Heart of America	Yes	Yes	Yes	Yes	Yes	Yes	Yes

== NJCAA ==
Team	School	City	Conference
Crowder Roughriders/Ladyriders	Crowder College	Neosho	Region XVI
East Central Falcons	East Central College	Union	Midwest CC
Jefferson Vikings	Jefferson College	Hillsboro	Midwest CC
MCC–Longview Wolves	Metropolitan Community College	Lee's Summit	Region XVI
MCC–Penn Valley Wolves	Metropolitan Community College	Kansas City	Region XVI
MCC–Blue River Wolves	Metropolitan Community College	Independence	Region XVI
MCC–Maple Woods Wolves	Metropolitan Community College	Kansas City	Region XVI
Mineral Area Cardinals	Mineral Area College	Park Hills	Midwest CC
Missouri State-West Plains Grizzlies	Missouri State University West Plains	West Plains	Midwest CC
Moberly Area Greyhounds	Moberly Area Community College	Moberly	Midwest CC
North Central Missouri Pirates	North Central Missouri College	Trenton	Region XVI
St. Charles Cougars	St. Charles Community College	Cottleville	Midwest CC
St. Louis Community College Archers	St. Louis Community College	St. Louis	Midwest CC
State Fair Roadrunners	State Fair Community College	Sedalia	Midwest CC
Three Rivers Raiders	Three Rivers Community College	Poplar Bluff	Midwest CC

== NCCAA ==
Team	School	City	Conference
Calvary Warriors	Calvary University	Kansas City	
Central Christian Saints	Central Bible University	Moberly	
College of the Ozarks Bobcats	College of the Ozarks	Point Lookout	
Mission Patriots	Mission University	Springfield	
Ozark Christian Ambassadors	Ozark Christian College	Joplin	
Spurgeon College Knights	Spurgeon College	Kansas City	

== Defunct ==
Team	School	City	Division	Defunct
St. Louis Christian Soldiers	St. Louis Christian College	Florissant	ACCA	2022 (Note: St. Louis Christian College merged with Central Bible University in December 2022.)

== See also ==
- List of NCAA Division I institutions
- List of NCAA Division II institutions
- List of NCAA Division III institutions
- List of NAIA institutions
- List of USCAA institutions
- List of NCCAA institutions
- List of NJCAA Division I institutions
- List of NJCAA Division II institutions
- List of NJCAA Division III institutions
