= National Collegiate Roller Hockey Association =

United States college roller hockey association

National Collegiate Roller Hockey Association (NCRHA)
- Current season, competition or edition: 2024–25 NCRHA season
- Sport: Inline hockey
- Founded: August 1, 2003
- First season: 2003–04
- Director: Brennan Edwards
- Country: United States
- Headquarters: Torrance, California, United States
- Continent: North America
- Related competitions: Division I Division II; Division III; Junior College Division; AA Division
- Website: NCRHA.org

The National Collegiate Roller Hockey Association (NCRHA) is an "incorporated not-for-profit corporation" which operates a national collegiate inline hockey league consisting of five divisions of competition (Division I, Division II, Division III, Junior College Division and AA Division). Headquartered in Torrance, California, the NCRHA is the national governing body of college inline hockey. The National Collegiate Roller Hockey Championships is held annually to determine the national champions at the end of each season.

The league was organized on August 1, 2003, after the suspension of operations of its predecessor organization, the Collegiate Roller Hockey League (CRHL), which had been founded in 1998. The NCRHA draws many highly skilled players from all over the United States. The NCRHA is not affiliated with the governing body of most college athletics, the National Collegiate Athletic Association (NCAA).

== Game ==
Each National Collegiate Roller Hockey Association game is played between two teams, 4 skaters aside, and is 36 minutes long. The game is composed of three 12–stopped clock periods with an intermission of one–minute between periods. At the end of the 36–minute regulation time, the team with the most goals wins the game. If at the end of regulation time, both teams are tied with the same number of goals, the game shall go to a 3 on 3-five minute sudden death overtime. If neither team scored after the 5 minutes have elapsed, a winner shall be declared by a shootout.

Ties do not occur during tournament format (such as regional and national championship tournaments) where a winner must be declared to advance to the next round of play. In these cases, sudden-death 12–minute four-on-four periods are played until one team scores. The first team to score a goal in the overtime period shall be declared the winner and advance to the next round.

== Inline hockey rink ==
National Collegiate Roller Hockey Association games are played on a rectangular inline hockey rink with rounded corners surrounded by walls and Plexiglas. As nearly as possible, it measures 80 by 180 feet (24.38 by 54.86 meters) in the NCRHA, with the minimum size of 65 by 145 feet (19.81 by 44.20 meters) and a maximum of 100 by 200 feet (30.48 by 60.96 meters). The center line divides the rink in half, which divides the floor into two attacking zones. Near the end of both ends of the rink, there is a thin red goal line spanning the width of the floor, which is used to judge goals.

== Season structure ==
The National Collegiate Roller Hockey Association season is divided into an exhibition season (October), a regular season (from October through February), regional championships (March) and the National Collegiate Roller Hockey Championships. During the exhibition season, teams usually play other teams in their member organization. During the regular season, clubs play each other in a predefined schedule. The regional championships are tournaments to determine member organization champions and automatic qualifiers for the National Collegiate Roller Hockey Championships. The final remaining team is crowned the national champion.

In the regular season, with the current NCRHA is divided into five divisions, and again geographically split into five member organizations. Schedules are determined by member organizations, as well as each team. Each team plays the majority of games against intra-organizational opponents. Some teams play select games against inter-organizational opponents.

The NCRHA's regular season standings are based on a point system instead of winning percentages. Points are awarded for each game, where two points are awarded for a win, one point for an overtime loss or tie, and zero points for a loss. At the end of the regular season, organizations hold a regional championship to determine its champion.

Regional champions along with a set number of at-large teams qualify for the National Collegiate Roller Hockey Championships. Teams are grouped into pools and play a round robin with teams in their respective pool to qualify for a single elimination tournament, with the remaining team being crowned national champion.

== Team alignment ==
The current league organization divides the teams into five divisions: Division I, Division II, Division III, Junior College Division, and AA Division. Teams are also grouped geographically into five Member Organizations. The current organization has roots in the 2022-23 season when the Great Plains Collegiate Inline Hockey League merged with the Midwest Collegiate Roller Hockey League, and the Rocky Mountain Collegiate Roller Hockey Association merged with the Western Collegiate Roller Hockey League.

=== List of member organizations ===
Member Organization	Abb	Location	Founded	Active Schools	Championships	Location	Venue
Eastern Collegiate Roller Hockey Association	ECRHA	Houston, TX	1998	19	ECRHA Conference Championships	Broomall, PA	Marple Sports Arena
Midwest Collegiate Roller Hockey League	MCRHL	Dublin, OH	2003	8	MCRHL Final	Fraser, MI (DII/JC and AA); Manchester, MO (DI and DIII)	Fraser Roller Hockey (DII/JC and AA); Midwest Sport Hockey (DI and DIII)
Southeastern Collegiate Roller Hockey League	SECRHL	Orlando, FL	2005	5	SECRHL Regional Championships	Snellville, GA	SGAA Dual Deck Hockey Arena
Southwest Collegiate Hockey League	SCHL	Denton, TX	1995	3	SCHL Conference Championship	Denton, TX	Lone Star Sports
Western Collegiate Roller Hockey League	WCRHL	Torrance, CA	1994	8	WCRHL Conference Championships	Corona, CA	The Rinks-Corona Inline

== Past Champions ==
=== Division I Premier ===
Year	Champion	Score	Runner-up	Location	Semi-Finalist #1	Semi-Finalist #2
1999	Michigan State	5–4	UC Santa Barbara	Chicago, IL	Penn State	Purdue
2000	Michigan State	5–4	Colorado State	Ellenton, FL	Cal Poly San Luis Obispo	Penn State Altoona
2001	RIT	10–5	Lindenwood	Upland, CA	Boston University	Truman State
2002	Lindenwood	6–4	Michigan State	St. Louis, MO	Purdue	Michigan
2003	Cal Poly Pomona	4–2	Florida	Feasterville, PA	RIT	Towson
2004	Lindenwood	10–3	Penn State	Anaheim, CA	Central Florida	Florida
2005	Lindenwood	5–2	Central Florida	Fort Collins, CO	Michigan State	Eastern Michigan
2006	Lindenwood	7–5	Michigan State	Morrisville, NC	Towson	Eastern Michigan
2007	Lindenwood	12–2	Rhode Island	St. Louis, MO	RIT	Eastern Michigan
2008	Lindenwood	6–3	Missouri-St. Louis	Colorado Springs, CO	UC Irvine	Central Florida
2009	Missouri-St. Louis	5–3	Lindenwood	Feasterville, PA	Buffalo	Michigan State
2010	Lindenwood	5–1	Arizona State	San Jose, CA	Buffalo	Missouri-St. Louis
2011	Long Beach State	4–3	Cal Poly San Luis Obispo	Middleton, WI	Lindenwood	Rowan
2012	Bethel	4–3	UNLV	Kearns, UT	Eastern Michigan	Michigan State
2013	Lindenwood	6–2	Michigan State	Ft. Myers, FL	UNLV	Neumann
2014	Lindenwood	2–1	Neumann	Aston, PA	UNLV	Hofstra
2015	Neumann	4–3	Lindenwood	Independence, MO	UNLV	Cal Poly San Luis Obispo
2016	Neumann	4–1	UNLV	Cedar Rapids, IA	Michigan State	Bethel
2017	Farmingdale State	5–4	Lindenwood	Ft. Myers, FL	Michigan State	UC Santa Barbara
2018	Farmingdale State	5–1	Lindenwood	Fargo, ND	Michigan State	North Dakota
2019	Farmingdale State	7–3	Lindenwood	Rochester, NY	Bethel	Arizona State
2021	Slippery Rock	3–2	Robert Morris	Pittsburgh, PA	Michigan State	none
2022	Lindenwood	7–2	Slippery Rock	Kalamazoo, MI	Bethel	Arizona State
2023	Lindenwood	13–0	Slippery Rock	Irvine, CA	Bethel	Arizona State
2024	Grand Canyon	2–1 (3OT)	Lindenwood	Auburn ME	Bethel	Henry Ford
2025	Lindenwood	2–0	Grand Canyon	Ft. Myers, FL	Arizona State	Rowan
2026	Lindenwood	6–3	Grand Canyon	Springfield, MO	Arizona State	none

=== Division I ===
Year	Champion	Score	Runner-up	Location	Semi-Finalist #1	Semi-Finalist #2
2026	Boston U	2–1	Arizona	Springfield, MO	Neumann	Quinnipiac

=== Division II ===
Year	Champion	Score	Runner-up	Location	Semi-Finalist #1	Semi-Finalist #2
2001	Eastern Michigan	6-1	Ball State	Upland, CA	Truman State	Wilkes University
2002	Illinois State	2-0	Ball State	St. Louis, MO	SUNY Buffalo	West Chester
2003	Binghamton University	6-3	Neumann	Feasterville, PA	Maine	Texas-Dallas
2004	Missouri-St. Louis	4-3	Neumann	Anaheim, CA	Maine	Nevada
2005	Nevada	4-2	Neumann	Fort Collins, CO	Washington University in St. Louis	Saint Louis
2006	Neumann	4-3	Missouri-St. Louis	Morrisville, NC	SUNY Brockport	Nevada
2007	Stony Brook University	4-1	Saint Louis	St. Louis, MO	Neumann	Missouri-St. Louis
2008	Neumann	6-1	West Chester	Colorado Springs, CO	UC San Diego	Cal State San Bernardino
2009	Grand Valley State	9-7	Central Michigan	Feasterville, PA	Neumann	Missouri State
2010	West Chester	7-5	Southern Illinois-Edwardsville	San Jose, CA	Rowan	Tampa
2011	Miami (FL)	4-3 (2OT)	Florida Gulf Coast	Middleton, WI	Bethel	USC
2012	Central Michigan	8-0	Pittsburgh	Kearns, UT	Northeastern	Kansas State
2013	Colorado-Colorado Springs	3-2 (OT)	Northeastern	Ft. Myers, FL	Kennesaw	Florida
2014	Cal State Fullerton	6-2	Virginia Tech	Aston, PA	Rutgers	Slippery Rock
2015	Farmingdale	10-5	Massachusetts	Independence, MO	UC San Diego	UC Irvine
2016	Massachusetts	2-1	Cortland	Cedar Rapids, IA	Robert Morris	Saint Joseph's
2017	Cal State Fullerton	6-2	Tennessee	Fort Myers, FL	Florida	Arkansas
2018	RIT	3-1	Northeastern	Fargo, ND	Florida	Northern Arizona
2019	Cal State Fullerton	5-2	Grand Valley State	Rochester, NY	Cal Poly San Luis Obispo	Kennesaw State
2022	Michigan State	2-1	Northeastern	Kalamazoo, MI	Cal Poly	Stony Brook
2023	Ohio State	5-4	UMass Amherst	Irvine, CA	Endicott	Robert Morris
2024	Arizona	7-2	Michigan State	Auburn ME	Cal State Fullerton	Robert Morris
2025	Neumann	2-1	Slippery Rock	Ft. Myers, FL	Cal State Fullerton	Ohio State
2026	Stony Brook	7–3	Endicott	Springfield, MO	Illinois State	Robert Morris

=== Division III ===
Year	Champion	Score	Runner-up	Location	Semi-Finalist #1	Semi-Finalist #2
2019	Endicott	5–3	California	Rochester, NY	Cal Poly Pomona	Oswego State
2022	Ohio State	6–4	Cortland	Kalamazoo, MI	Arizona	Endicott
2023	Neumann	9–1	Quinnipiac	Irvine, CA	Florida	Oswego State
2024	Yeshiva	5–4	Hofstra	Auburn ME	Florida	Oswego State
2025	Colorado	3–2 (OT)	Tampa	Ft. Myers, FL	Florida Gulf Coast	Maryville
2026	Purdue	4–1	Florida Gulf Coast	Springfield, MO	Hofstra	Maryville

=== Junior College Division ===
Year	Champion	Score	Runner-up	Location	Semi-Finalist #1	Semi-Finalist #2
2000	St. Charles CC	12-5	Elgin CC	Ellenton, FL	St. Louis CC - Meramec	Grossmont CC
2001	St. Charles CC	7-6 (OT)	Grossmont CC	Upland, CA		
2002	St. Charles CC	6-5	St. Louis CC - Meramec	St.Louis, MO	Collin College	Valencia College
2003	St. Charles CC	3-2	St. Louis CC - Meramec	Feasterville, PA	Northern Virginia CC	Suffolk CCC
2004	St. Charles CC	7-2	Suffolk CCC	Anaheim, CA	St. Louis CC - Meramec	Moorpark College
2005	St. Charles CC	6-5	Riverside CC	Fort Collins, CO	St. Louis CC - Meramec	Suffolk CCC
2006	Riverside CC	5-4	St. Louis CC - Meramec	Morrisville, NC	St. Charles CC	Suffolk CCC
2007	St. Charles CC	8-2	Broward College	St. Louis, MO	Suffolk CCC	Nassau CC
2008	Broward College	8-7 (OT)	Oakland CC	Colorado Springs, CO	St. Charles CC	St. Louis CC - Meramec
2009	Saddleback College	4-3 (OT)	St. Charles CC	Feasterville, PA	Suffolk CCC	Nassau CC
2010	St. Charles CC	8-3	Citrus College	San Jose, CA	Saddleback College	St. Louis CC
2011	St. Charles CC	3-2 (OT)	St. Louis CC	Middleton, WI	Schoolcraft CC	Santa Barbara CC
2012	St. Charles CC	3-2	Saddleback College	Kearns, UT	St. Louis CC	Santa Barbara CC
2013	St. Charles CC	4-0 (Best-of-Seven)	Saddleback College	Irvine, CA		
2014	St. Charles CC	4-0 (Best-of-Seven)	Arapahoe CC	Lakewood, CO		
2016	St. Charles CC	3-1 (Best-of-Five)	West Valley College	Cedar Rapids, IA		
2017	West Valley College	10-0	St. Charles CC	Ft. Meyers, FL	St. Louis CC	
2018	Saddleback College	3-2	West Valley College	Fargo, ND	Henry Ford College	St. Louis CC
2019	St. Louis CC	6-2	Henry Ford College	Rochester, NY	West Valley College	
2022	Henry Ford College	3-1 (Best-of-Five)	West Valley College	Kalamazoo, MI		

=== Division IV/AA ===
Year	Champion	Score	Runner-up	Location	Semi-Finalist #1	Semi-Finalist #2
2004	Lindenwood	10-2	St. Louis CC - Meramec	Anaheim, CA	Cal Poly San Luis Obispo	Eastern Michigan
2005	Lindenwood	3-2	Eastern Michigan	Fort Collins, CO	Cal Poly San Luis Obispo	Western Michigan
2006	Lindenwood	10-1	St. Louis CC - Meramec	Morrisville, NC	Cal Poly San Luis Obispo	Eastern Michigan
2007	Lindenwood	13-2	St. Louis CC - Meramec	St. Louis, MO	Suffolk CC	Michigan State
2008	Lindenwood	5-1	Central Florida	Colorado Springs, CO	UC Santa Barbara	Michigan State
2009	Lindenwood	8-2	Penn State	Feasterville, PA	Central Florida	Buffalo
2010	Penn State	6-2	Central Florida	San Jose, CA	Lindenwood	UC Santa Barbara
2011	Lindenwood	7-6 (OT)	West Chester	Middleton, WI	Central Florida	Michigan State
2012	Lindenwood	7-1	West Chester	Kearns, UT	Arizona State	Colorado
2013	Lindenwood	5-3	Arizona State	Ft. Myers, FL	Central Florida	Michigan State
2014	Lindenwood	4-3	Michigan State	Aston, PA	Arizona State	Slippery Rock
2015	Lindenwood	6-5	Neumann	Independence, MO	Michigan State	Florida Gulf Coast
2016	Lindenwood	4-3	Michigan State	Cedar Rapids, IA	Bethel	Neumann
2017	Lindenwood	3-1	Farmingdale	Fort Myers, FL	Grand Valley State	Michigan State
2018	Lindenwood	4-2	Farmingdale	Fargo, ND	Bethel	Michigan State
2019	Bethel	4-1	Farmingdale	Rochester, NY	Lindenwood	Michigan State
2022	Lindenwood	10-0	Slippery Rock	Kalamazoo, MI	Arizona	Michigan State
2023	Lindenwood	10-0	Arizona	Irvine, CA	Slippery Rock	Farmingdale
2024	Lindenwood	8-0	Boston University	Auburn ME	Slippery Rock	Ohio State
2025	Lindenwood	6-1	Slippery Rock	Ft. Myers, FL	Michigan State	Boston U
2026	Lindenwood	3–2 (OT)	Grand Canyon	Springfield, MO	Arizona	Boston U

=== NCRHA Winterfest ===
Year	Champion	Score	Runner-up	Location	Semi-Finalist #1	Semi-Finalist #2
2001	Michigan State		Missouri	Las Vegas, NV	Penn State Altoona	Colorado State
2002	Michigan State	3-2 (OT)	Ohio State	Las Vegas, NV	Penn State	RIT
2003	Michigan State	5-1	Central Florida	Las Vegas, NV	Cal Poly San Luis Obispo	RIT
2004	Michigan State	6-5 (OT)	Central Florida	Las Vegas, NV	Towson	South Florida
2005	Eastern Michigan	6-4	Michigan State	Wixom, MI	Missouri-St. Louis	Central Florida
2006	Lindenwood	8-2	St. Charles CC	St. Peters, MO	North Carolina State	Eastern Michigan
2007	Florida International	6-5 (OT)	West Point	Key West, FL	Missouri-Rolla	Colorado
2008	West Point	4-3	Missouri-Rolla	Key West, FL	Colorado	Florida International
2009	Eastern Michigan	5-4	Florida International	Key West, FL	Missouri S&T	Key West

- 2001-2004 - Event was held at NARCH Winternationals
- 2005 - Event was renamed NCRHA Winter Invitational
- 2007 - Event was renamed NCRHA Winterfest
- 2026 - Event announced to resume after 17-year hiatus in Naples, FL
