= Missouri Community College Athletic Conference =

Collegiate sport conference in Missouri, U.S.

- Formerly: Midwest Junior College Athletic Conference (MJCAC)
- Association: NJCAA
- Founded: 1965
- Commissioner: Jay Mehrhoff
- Sports fielded: 18; men's: 8; women's: 10
- No. of teams: 9
- Headquarters: St. Louis, Missouri
- Region: Missouri – NJCAA Region 16
- Official website: http://mccac.co/

The Missouri Community College Athletic Conference (MCCAC) is a college athletic conference affiliated with the National Junior College Athletic Association (NJCAA) within its Region 16. The MCCAC is headquartered in St. Louis.

== Member schools ==
=== Current members ===
The MCCAC currently has nine full members, all of which are public schools:

| Institution | Location (Note: All cities are located within the State of Missouri.) | Founded | Type | Enrollment | Nickname | Joined |
|---|---|---|---|---|---|---|
| East Central College | Union | 1968 | Public | 2,629 | Falcons | ? |
| Jefferson College | Hillsboro | 1963 | Public | 4,179 | Vikings | ? |
| Mineral Area College | Park Hills | 1965 | Public | 2,640 | Cardinals | ? |
| Moberly Area Community College | Moberly | 1927 | Public | 5,600 | Greyhounds | ? |
| Missouri State University–West Plains | West Plains | 1963 | Public (Note: Part of the Missouri State University System.) | 1,869 | Grizzlies | ? |
| State Fair Community College | Sedalia | 1966 | Public | 4,284 | Roadrunners | ? |
| St. Charles Community College | Cottleville | 1986 | Public | 6,438 | Cougars | ? |
| St. Louis Community College (Note: All four STLCC campuses participate as a combined entity. In addition, those three campuses of St. Louis Community College (Florissant Valley, Forest Park and Meramec) participated as individual members, prior to STLCC consolidating athletic programs under one banner; while Wildwood never operated a separate athletic program prior to the consolidation.) | St. Louis | 2014 | Public | 18,835 | Archers | ? |
| Three Rivers College | Poplar Bluff | 1966 | Public | 2,965 | Raiders | ? |

=== Former members ===
The MCCAC has five former full members, all of which were public schools:

| Institution | Location | Founded | Type | Enrollment | Nickname | Joined | Left | Current conference |
|---|---|---|---|---|---|---|---|---|
| North Central Missouri College | Trenton, Missouri | 1925 | Public | 1,458 | Pirates | ? | ? | Independent (NJCAA Region XVI) |
| Shawnee Community College | Ullin, Illinois | 1967 | Public (Note: Part of the Illinois Community College System.) | 2,388 | Saints | ? | ? | Great Rivers (GRAC) (NJCAA Region XXIV) |
| St. Louis Community College–Florissant Valley (Note: men's soccer.) | Ferguson, Missouri | 1971 | Public | 7,210 | Fury | ? | ? | N/A (Note: All four STLCC campuses now participate as a combined entity. Originally, those three campuses of St. Louis Community College which had athletics (Florissant Valley, Forest Park and Meramec) participated as individual members prior to STLCC consolidating athletic programs under one banner; Wildwood never operated an athletic program prior to the consolidation.) |
| St. Louis Community College–Forest Park (Note: men's and women's basketball.) | St. Louis, Missouri | 1967 | Public | 8,207 | Highlanders | ? | ? | N/A |
| St. Louis Community College–Meramec (Note: baseball, softball, women's soccer and volleyball.) | Kirkwood, Missouri | 1972 | Public | 12,000 | Magic | ? | ? | N/A |
