= Jeff Sendobry =

American soccer player

Personal information
- Date of birth: September 6, 1958 (age 68)
- Place of birth: St. Louis, Missouri, United States
- Position: Defender

Youth career
- 1976–1977: St. Louis Community College
- 1978–1979: Indiana Hoosiers

Senior career*
Years	Team	Apps	(Gls)
1980	Cleveland Cobras		
1980–1984	St. Louis Steamers (indoor)	40	(3)
- * Club domestic league appearances and goals

Jeff Sendobry is a retired American soccer defender who spent one season in the American Soccer League and four in the Major Indoor Soccer League.

Sendobry grew up in St. Louis where he attended Christian Brothers College High School. He began his collegiate career at St. Louis Community College where he was a 1977 Honorable Mention (third team) NJCAA All American. He then attended the Indiana University where he played on the men's soccer team in 1978 and 1979. In 1980, he played for the Cleveland Cobras in the American Soccer League. In the fall of 1980, he signed with the expansion St. Louis Steamers of the Major Indoor Soccer League. He remained with the Steamers until 1984.
