= Lincoln and Lee University =

University in Kansas City, Missouri, US (1927–1933)

- Seal of Lincoln and Lee University
- Motto: Fide et Constantia
- Type: Private
- Active: 1927–1933
- Religious affiliation: Methodist Episcopal Church
- President: Ernest Lynn Waldorf
- Location: Kansas City, Missouri, United States
- Successor: University of Kansas City

Lincoln and Lee University was a Methodist Episcopal college in Kansas City, Missouri. It merged with the University of Kansas City in 1933.

== History ==
In 1925, a group of Methodist Episcopal Church leaders decided to create Lincoln and Lee University at the intersection of 75th and State Line in Kansas City, Missouri and Kansas. Its founders included philanthropist Kate B. Hewitt, former president of Centre College Ernest H. Newcomb, and Methodist Bishop Ernest Lynn Waldorf. Hewitt donated 143 acres of farmland for the university. Other donations expanded the campus site to 272 acres, with 37 acres in Missouri and the rest in Kansas. Other notable donors included J. C Nichols, Henry S. Siegrist, and William Volker.

The university was incorporated in Missouri circuit court in January 1926, with 75 board members and Waldorf as its president. The name was selected to smooth the Northern and Southern branches of the church in Kansas City. Waldorf noted that the location in Kansas City could be healing as it was "where North met South and East met West". In addition, plans included a national memorial at the center of the campus and two tombs for unknown Federal and Confederate soldiers. The university was endorsed as a project of the board of education of the Methodist Episcopal Church in February 1926. Its Kansas charter was received on March 2, 1927.

The architectural plans for the campus were presented in April 1926. Its architect was Edward Buehler Delk. A 1926 promotional brochure for donors said, "All history confirms the record. The university towers and Cathedral spires that fret the skies above the imperial cities of the world were never indispensable to their commerce or their business." Plans were in place to build seven buildings in 1926, including the university's administrative building, an academic building, the College of Arts and Sciences, a library, and a combined church and auditorium. Plans were also made to add athletic facilities and dormitories.

The university made agreements to merge with the Kansas City Dental School and the Kansas City College of Pharmacy in 1926. Hewitt's husband had been president of the former. This effectively meant that the university opened in September 1927. The university also entered into merger agreements with the Kansas City School of Commerce and the American Savings, and Loan Institute in 1927. In January 1928, the university's officials announced plans for a $600,000 bond that would allow construction of the new campus to begin in the spring.

However, Newcomb and Waldorf's fundraising efforts only secured some $800,000 toward their goal of five million dollars, in part because their effort intersected with the 1929 stock market crash. The university did not graduate any students, except through its partner institutions.

In 1930, the Lincoln and Lee University's founders began meeting with a group trying to establish a junior college, the non-sectarian University of Kansas City, to discuss a possible merger. The Lincoln and Lee University board ratified the proposed merger on November 29, 1930. The two groups merged their assets in 1933. The University of Kansas City opened on October 2, 1933.

== Academics ==
The university offered classes through Kansas City Dental School and the Kansas City College of Pharmacy. Its School of Commerce started classes in October 1927, offering classes in business, finance, foreign trade, marketing, manufacturing, personnel management, production, and transportation.

== Student life ==
The fledging university had a chapter of Theta Nu Epsilon, its only Greek letter social organization, and various musical organizations. Its yearbook was called the Bushwacker. There was also a chapter of Psi Omega professional dental fraternity and the Xi Psi Phi professional dentristry fraternity at the Dental School. The university also had a basketball team.

== See also ==
- List of colleges and universities in Missouri
