= Tracy D. Hall =

American academic administrator

President of Southwest Tennessee Community College
- Incumbent
- Assumed office July 13, 2015
- Preceded by: Nate Essex

Member of the SACSCOC Board of Trustees
- Incumbent
- Assumed office January 1, 2021
- Preceded by: L. Anthony Wise, Jr.

Personal details
- Citizenship: United States
- Spouse: Anthony "Butch" Hall
- Children: 3
- Occupation: Academic administrator

Tracy D. Hall is an American academic administrator who is president of Southwest Tennessee Community College.

== Early life and education ==
Hall grew up in St. Louis, Missouri. She attended McCluer High School, where she played basketball for the Comets, and also where she was voted homecoming queen as a senior and also voted "most popular" by the class of 1985.

A first-generation college student, Hall enrolled at Southeast Missouri State University in 1985–1986. She graduated from the University of Missouri-St. Louis with a degree in speech and mass communications.

During graduate school at Wichita State University, a faculty member asked her if she'd be interested in teaching.

Hall got a PhD in leadership and policy analysis from the University of Missouri.

== Career ==
Hall taught at the Metropolitan Community College-Penn Valley in Kansas City, Missouri for six years.

From 2011 to 2015, Hall returned to St. Louis to serve as Vice President of Academic Affairs at St. Louis Community College-Forest Park. She then moved to Memphis, Tennessee, after she was elected the next president of Southwest Tennessee Community College by the Tennessee Board of Regents.
