= East Central Junior College =

East Central Junior College may refer to:

- East Central College, in Union, Missouri
- East Central Community College, in Decatur, Mississippi
