= Steve Tappmeyer =

American basketball coach (born 1957)

Biographical details
- Born: June 9, 1957 (age 69); Gerald, Missouri, U.S.
- Education: East Central College; Southeast Missouri State

Coaching career (HC unless noted)
- 1986–1988: East Central College
- 1989–2009: Northwest Missouri State
- 2010–2013: Missouri-St. Louis

Head coaching record
- Overall: 499–287

Steve Tappmeyer (born June 9, 1957) served 21 seasons as basketball coach of the Northwest Missouri State University Bearcats men's basketball team. Tappmeyer was the longest serving coach for the school and had the most wins (407–208 (.662)). He served as the head coach for the University of Missouri–St. Louis Tritons from 2010 to 2013.

== Early years ==
Tappmeyer was born in Gerald, Missouri, attended East Central Junior College where he played basketball. He was an honorable-mention All-conference as a sophomore.

He transferred to Southeast Missouri State University after his sophomore season in 1978. He averaged 16.3 points and was an honorable-mention All-MIAA as a junior.

== Coaching career ==
=== East Central College ===
Tappmeyer was a basketball assistant at Northwest Missouri State University from 1981 to 1985. He was the basketball head coach at East Central College from 1986 to 1988, where he had a 62–32 record in three seasons and was named the 1986 MCCAC Coach of the Year.

=== Northwest Missouri State University ===
In the fall of 1988, he was hired as the Northwest Missouri State University head basketball coach. From 1998 to 2008, his teams won 19 or more games. His teams reached the NCAA Division II playoffs in 1998, 2000, 2001, 2002, 2003, 2004, 2006, 2007 and 2008 (accounting for all but one of Northwest's post-season NCAA Division II appearances). It was in Elite 8 in 2002 and 2004. His teams won the regular season MIAA in 1998, 2002, 2007 and 2008. They won the MIAA post-season tournament in 1989, 2002, 2004 and 2008.

Tappmeyer finished as the school's all-time leader in wins with 408 victories. He won seven MIAA Championships, three regular season titles and four conference tournament titles. He qualified to the NCAA Tournament ten times, with two appearances ending in berths to the Elite Eight (2002 and 2004)..

He had a streak of 11 straight seasons with 19 or more wins and his teams surpassed 22 wins in 9 of his final 12 years. He was a four-time MIAA Coach of the year and the 2001 South Central Region Coach of the Year. His teams had a record of 143 wins and only 25 losses at the school's Bearcat Arena during his final 12 seasons. Additionally, he also was the head tennis coach at Northwest for a brief time.

In 2014, he was inducted into the Northwest Missouri State M-Club Hall of Fame. In 2017, he was inducted into the MIAA Hall of Fame.

Year	W	L	MIAA Reg Season	MIAA Tournament	Postseason
1989	21	9		#	
1990	14	13			
1991	12	15			
1992	16	12			
1993	14	13			
1994	18	10			
1995	13	14			
1996	19	7			
1997	11	16			
1998	23	7	*		Playoffs
1999	19	10			
2000	22	8			Playoffs
2001	25	6			Playoffs
2002	29	3	*	#	Semifinals (Elite 8)
2003	22	9			Playoffs
2004	29	5		#	Semifinals (Elite 8)
2005	19	11			
2006	22	10			Quarterfinals
2007	24	7	*		Playoffs
2008	24	8	*	#	Playoffs
2009	12	15			

=== University of Missouri-St. Louis ===
Tappmeyer was the basketball head coach at the University of Missouri-St. Louis from 2010 to 2013. In 2010-11, the team posted a 16-11 overall record, including a 10-8 Great Lakes Valley Conference record, the first winning GLVC mark in program history.

In 2011-12, he coached the school to a 19-9 record, its most wins since the 1990-91 campaign. The team finished with a 13-5 Great Lakes Valley Conference record, while winning the West Division title. The school began the league schedule with a 6-0 record for the first time in program history and those six wins were part of a 10-game win streak, the second longest in program history. Tappmeyer also guided UMSL to their first-ever GLVC Tournament victory, a 71-60 win against Drury in the quarterfinals. He was named Co-GLVC Coach of the Year and the NABC Co-Midwest Region Coach of the Year.

In 2012-13, he finished with a 17-10 overall record, including a 10-8 Great Lakes Valley Conference record.

On April 23, 2013, he announced his resignation, due to what he called burnout. He accomplished a winning season in each of his three campaigns, which had not been done in the school since the first four years of the basketball program existence (starting in 1966-67). He posted a 52-30 (.634) overall record at UMSL. In 2012-13, the team finished with a 17-10 overall record, including a 10-8 Great Lakes Valley Conference record. In 24 years as a Division II basketball head coach, he had a 460-238 (.660) overall record.

Year	W	L	GLVC Reg Season	GLVC Tournament	Postseason
2010	16	11			
2011	19	9			
2012	17	10			

=== Owensville High School ===
Tappmeyer, moved to Owensville, Missouri to help take care of an ailing family member. From 2013 to 2014, he was the Athletic Director at Owensville High School. In 2015-16, he guided the girls basketball team to a Class 4 third-place finish, before announcing his retirement at the end of the season.

=== Maryville University ===
In 2020 Tappmeyer came out of retirement to be an assistant coach for the Maryville Saints at Maryville University in suburban St. Louis. The head coach for the team, Jesse Shaw, had been a player for Tappmeyer from 2001 to 2005 at Northwest during Tappmeyer's most successful stint at the university, when his teams twice made it to the Elite 8.
