= Mike Miano =

American football player (born 1973)

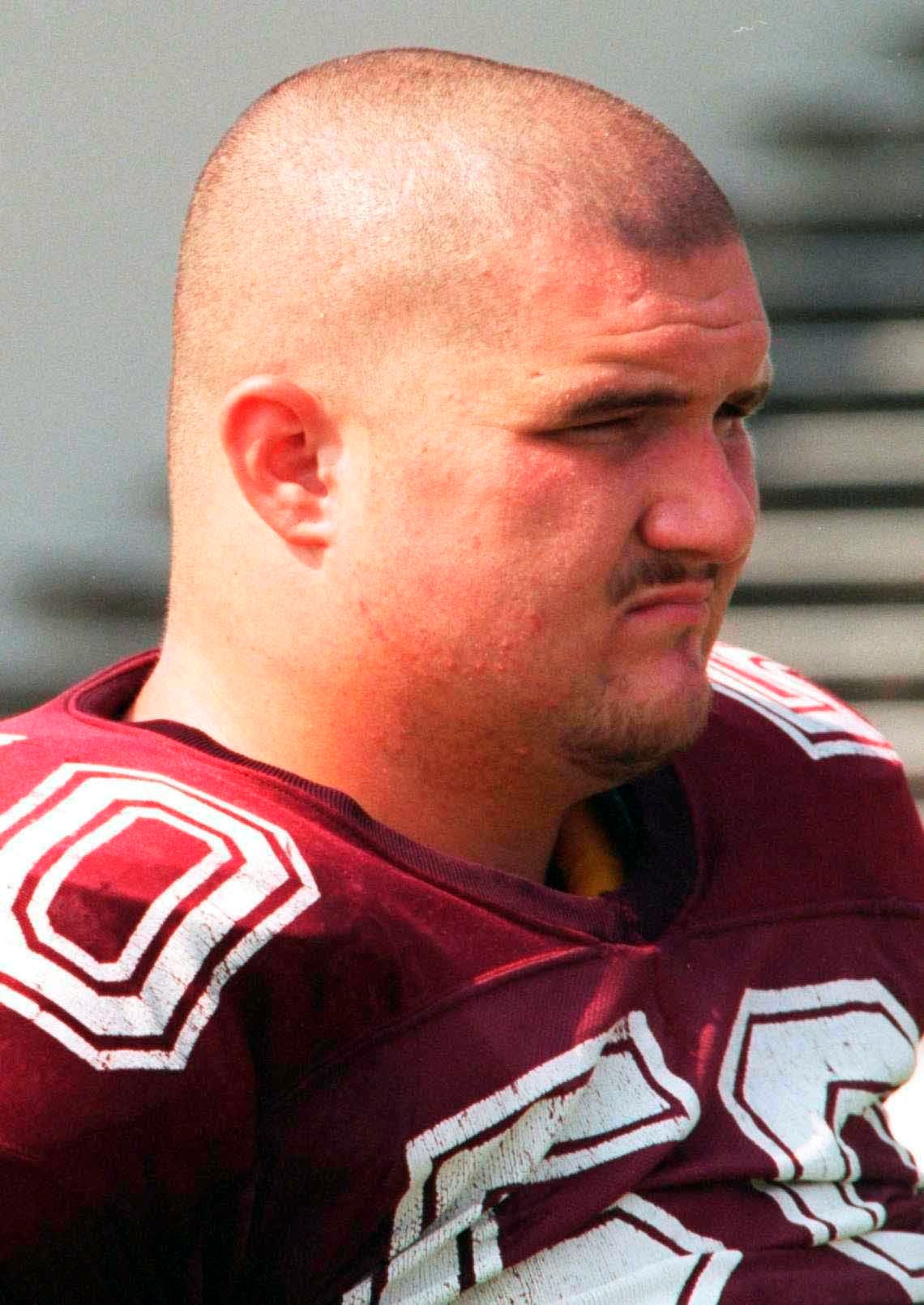

No. 50
- Position: Defensive tackle

Personal information
- Born: December 17, 1973 (age 52); St. Louis, Missouri, U.S.
- Listed height: 6 ft 3 in (1.91 m)
- Listed weight: 303 lb (137 kg)

Career information
- High school: Affton High School (St. Louis, Missouri)
- College: Southwest Missouri State (1995–1996)
- NFL draft: 1997: 7th round, 210th overall pick

Career history
- Chicago Bears (1997)*
- * Offseason or practice squad member only

Mike Miano (born December 17, 1973) is a former American football player who played the position of defensive tackle. He is currently a teacher working for the Department of War Education Activity (DoWEA.)

== Early life ==
Miano attended Affton High School in St.Louis, Missouri, where he starred in football and wrestling from 1988 to 1992. In football, he won All-Conference, All-District, All-Metro and All-State honors as a defensive and offensive lineman. In wrestling he made it to the State Championship Tournament in the heavyweight division. Miano's dominance on the gridiron generated much interest from NCAA Division I universities. In spite of his athletic and academic potential, Miano was ineligible to receive scholarship offers from any of the interested universities due to NCAA regulations.

== Collegiate career ==
Miano enrolled at the St. Louis Community College and was athletically inactive from 1992 until 1994. His collegiate football career began at Highland Community College in Highland, Kansas. Miano earned All-Conference and All-American honors for his play in the 1994 season at HCC. While at Highland, Miano received dozens of scholarship offers from Big Eight Conference, Big Ten Conference, Western Athletic Conference and Big East Conference schools.

Miano accepted a scholarship to play at the University of Kansas and enrolled there in the spring of 1995. After completing spring football practices at Kansas, Miano transferred to Southwest Missouri State University in Springfield, Missouri. His play in the 1995 season at Missouri State earned him the Gateway Football Conference Defensive Newcomer of the Year award and All-Conference honors. Miano was also named the Bears Defensive Lineman of the Year. Miano entered the 1996 season as one of the Bears team captains. His play earned him Associated Press and AFCA 1st Team All-American honors. He was named the Gateway Football Conference's Defensive Player of the Year.

== Professional career ==
Miano's performance at Missouri State attracted the attention of multiple teams in the NFL. On April 20, 1997, Miano was selected as the ninth pick in the seventh round of the NFL Draft, 210th overall, by the Chicago Bears.
