= Medical District High School =

School in Memphis, Tennessee, United States

Coordinates: 35.1370°N 90.0365°W

Location
- 737 Union Ave; Memphis, Tennessee 38103; United States

Information
- Opened: August 9, 2021
- School district: Memphis-Shelby County Schools
- NCES School ID: 470014802672
- Teaching staff: 9.59 (FTE) (2023-2024)
- Grades: 9–12
- Enrollment: 111 (2023-2024)
- Website: medicaldistrict-hs.scsk12.org

Medical District High School (MDHS) is a public high school located in Memphis, Tennessee. It is a part of Memphis-Shelby County Schools.

It is located on the property of Southwest Tennessee Community College, located in Building E.

The school opened in 2021.

Kesha Ivy became the school's first principal.

Students at MDHS are permitted to take community college courses and may, during their studies, pursue associates degrees in allied health and in information technology.
