= Terry Kennedy (politician) =

American politician

Terry M. Kennedy

Clerk of the Board of Aldermen, City of St. Louis
- In office 1989–2019
- Preceded by: Samuel M. Kennedy
- Succeeded by: Jesse Todd

Personal details
- Born: St. Louis, MO
- Party: Democratic
- Relatives: Shirley Horn (cousin)
- Education: Magna Cum Laude graduate, Howard University, School of Communications
- Known for: Progressive advocacy

Terry M. Kennedy is a Democratic Party politician, journalist, historian, human rights activist and former teacher assistant in St. Louis, Missouri. Kennedy was a long-term elected official of the Board of Aldermen representing D-18th ward of the city's central corridor.

As the chair of the powerful Public Safety Committee (PSC), Ald. Terry Kennedy was a champion of public safety, criminal justice reforms, civil rights, and human rights. His staunch ideals of reform and equity led to his spearheading the passing of a Civilian Oversight Board (COB) for the St. Louis Metropolitan Police Department. The measure marked the culmination of 10 years of Kennedy’s work.

During a 31-year span, Kennedy served as the Chair of the African American Aldermanic Caucus, Chair of the Public Safety Committee of the Board of Aldermen; Vice Chair of the Engrossment, Rules Resolution & Credentials Committee; a member of the Housing Committee, Legislation Committee, and Personnel Committee. Because of his seniority, Kennedy was also the Floor Majority Leader of the Board.

Terry preceded his father Alderman Samuel M. Kennedy into politics, rivaling his father's record of 21 years. After thirty-one years, Terry resigned as alderman of the 18th Ward and was appointed as the Board's first African American Clerk of the Board of Aldermen in 2019.

== Early life and family ==
Kennedy's father, Samuel M. Kennedy was born in East St. Louis, Illinois and escaped the 1917 race riots with his family. The family house was fired upon, and mobs attempted to torch it. The Kennedy family was forced to escape out a window. Recorded records indicate his grandmother built a raft to cross the Mississippi River because the St. Louis Metropolitan Police Department (SLMPD) was initially blocking African Americans transit on Eads bridges to prevent victims from escaping to St. Louis. Kennedy worked with his twin Gary “Dhati” Kennedy on the St. Louis Ad-Hoc Committee for Historical Truth to collaborate with others to sponsor the first public commemorative activity of the East St. Louis Race Riot in 1997. In 2017 as descendants of the East St. Louis Race Riots, they spearheaded the 100th Year Commemoration of the East St. Louis Race Riots on Eads Bridge and across the metro area. The family's descendants of Johnson's and Horn's, have been in the St. Louis metro region since 1720. They were transported to the area when Philip François Renault settled with 500 Africans from Saint-Domingue. His grandparents spoke Creole and his mother spoke French and English.

Kennedy graduated from Vashon High School in north St. Louis, where he was chair of the Black Students Union. He studied architecture at St. Louis Community College–Forest Park and the University of Missouri–St. Louis (UMSL) but changed paths during the course of these studies. He moved to Washington, D.C. and earned his B.A. degree, Magna Cum Laude, in Communications studying journalism from Howard University in 1978. He wrote for St. Louis Argus and the Negro Association (now the National Newspaper Publishers Association (NNPA)) newspapers. As an adult he worked on campaigns of racial justice and desegregation, the Anti-Apartheid Movement, to free Angela Davis, on community development, and conducted employment placement/job readiness training for youth and young adults.

== Political career ==
• Kennedy sought an immediate cease and desist of the illegal removal of individuals buried in Washington Park Cemetery as a part of the Airport Runway Expansion program; • Kennedy sponsored a Work Force bill to ensure jobs for minorities, women, apprentices and city residents on city construction contracts ranging over $1 million; • Kennedy sponsored legislation towards a city MBE/WBE remediation program to create city requirements to ensure the hiring of minority and women owned construction businesses, and sponsored legislation funding a disparity study related to the city’s usage of (MBE/WBE) owned construction companies in city issued construction contracts. • Kennedy created a sister cities cultural exchange program between St. Louis, Senegal and St. Louis, MO; • Kennedy initiated racial equity efforts at the Board of Aldermen leading to the Board receiving racial equity training; • Kennedy urged the state of Missouri to pass a minimum wage bill that would have increased the local minimum wage for city workers. • Kennedy sponsored a resolution to honor Black History Month and co-sponsored efforts to display the Red, Black & Green flag during the month’s celebration by the city; • Kennedy sponsored legislation protecting Channel 10, City of St. Louis TV station, to ensure city residents would be able to review functioning of government through cable • Kennedy co-sponsored legislation to create a permanent fund to provide Youth Crime Prevention Programs and established a review process for the programs; • Kennedy sponsored legislation requiring rail companies to report transport of all hazardous waste materials that passing through the city; • Kennedy sponsored legislation for renewal of the City’s cable franchise, which included for the first time, provisions for customer service protection guidelines; • Kennedy identified, secured and sponsored legislation for disaster relief for the areas of the city hit by the 2011 tornado; • Kennedy sought a moratorium on the death penalty; • Kennedy co-sponsored legislation to underwrite a health disparity access study for residents in North St. Louis and chaired an oversight workgroup to disseminate its findings.

As head of the Public Safety Committee, Kennedy began a seven-year journey in 2005 working with various community organizations to push the Civilian Oversight Board (COB). That legislation would create a review process for citizen complaints related to the St. Louis Police Department. The Civilian Oversight Board (COB) bill passed the city legislature in 2006 but was vetoed by Mayor Francis Slay. Following the shooting of Michael Brown and the resulting Ferguson Uprising ten years later, an Civilian Oversight Board (COB) bill finally passed in 2015. It gained subpoena power in the aftermath of the 2017 St. Louis protests. In November 2018, President of the Board of Aldermen Lewis E. Reed announced that the board unanimously elected Kennedy as its next Clerk. He will be the first Black person to hold the position. He served as vice-chairs of the Engrossment Rules, Resolutions and Credentials committee and was a member on the Housing, Urban Development and Zoning, Legislation, and Personnel and Administration committees.

In March 2019, Jesse Todd, who Kennedy supported, won a hotly contested 5-way primary election.

Political offices
Preceded by Sam Kennedy	Alderman of the 18th Ward; 1989–2019	Succeeded by Jesse Todd
