= 2013 National Collegiate Roller Hockey Championships Division I =

The 2013 National Collegiate Roller Hockey Championships was the 15th national championship tournament for college inline hockey in the United States. The Division I tournament involved 24 teams to determine the national champion of the 2012–13 season at the Division I level of the National Collegiate Roller Hockey Association (NCRHA), the highest level of competition in college inline hockey. The tournament was hosted by the Southeastern Collegiate Roller Hockey League at the Fort Myers Skatium in Fort Myers, Florida.

== Tournament procedure ==
The tournament consisted of 24 teams being divided into six pools of four, who play a three-game round robin within their pools. The teams were then seeded, based on pool standings, and advance to a five-round single elimination playoff.

== Qualifying teams ==
The at-large bids for the tournament were announced on March 11. The pools and seeding for each team in the tournament were announced on March 25. The Eastern Collegiate Roller Hockey Association, Southeastern Collegiate Roller Hockey League and Western Collegiate Roller Hockey League each had five teams receive a berth in the tournament, Midwest Collegiate Roller Hockey League had four teams receive a berth, Great Plains Collegiate Inline Hockey League had three teams receive a berth, and the Southwest Collegiate Hockey League had two teams receive a berth.

Pool A					Pool B				
Seed	School	Organization	Record	Berth type	Seed	School	Organization	Record	Berth type
1	Lindenwood	GPCIHL	20–0–2	Tournament champion	2	Michigan State	MCRHL	29–4–2	Tournament champion
4	UNLV	WCRHL	15–8–2	At-large bid	3	Neumann	ECRHA	27–3–2	Tournament champion
5	Eastern Michigan	MCRHL	18–10–1	At-large bid	6	Bethel	SECRHL	23–4–1	At-large bid
8	UC Santa Barbara	WCRHL	11–11–3	Tournament champion	7	Long Beach State	WCRHL	15–7–1	At-large bid
Pool C					Pool D				
Seed	School	Organization	Record	Berth type	Seed	School	Organization	Record	Berth type
9	George Mason	SECRHL	16–5–1	Tournament champion	13	Hofstra	ECRHA	23–5–3	At-large bid
10	Grand Valley State	MCRHL	15–8–3	At-large bid	14	Florida Gulf Coast	SECRHL	14–5–0	At-large bid
11	Illinois	GPCIHL	11–7–4	At-large bid	15	Cal Poly	WCRHL	13–8–3	At-large bid
12	West Chester	ECRHA	21–9–4	At-large bid	16	UMSL	GPCIHL	13–9–0	At-large bid
Pool E					Pool F				
Seed	School	Organization	Record	Berth type	Seed	School	Organization	Record	Berth type
17	Texas Tech	SCHL	15–8–1	At-large bid	21	Pittsburgh	ECRHA	18–9–2	At-large bid
18	Arizona State	WCRHL	10–10–3	At-large bid	22	North Texas	SCHL	16–8–3	Tournament champion
19	Ohio State	MCRHL	12–13–2	At-large bid	23	Brockport	ECRHA	14–15–1	At-large bid
20	East Carolina	SECRHL	8–9–3	At-large bid	24	Central Florida	SECRHL	7–9–3	At-large bid

== Pool play ==
All times are local (UTC−4).

=== Pool A ===
Seed	Team	GP	W	L	T	GF	GA	PTS
1	Lindenwood	3	3	0	0	23	4	6
2	Eastern Michigan	3	1	1	1	18	18	3
3	UNLV	3	1	1	1	11	18	3
4	UC Santa Barbara	3	0	3	0	8	20	0

April 10, 2013; 2:15 pm	Eastern Michigan	2 – 8	Lindenwood	Fort Myers Skatium, Fort Myers; Revision Rink

Game reference

April 10, 2013; 3:15 pm	UC Santa Barbara	3 – 4	UNLV	Fort Myers Skatium, Fort Myers; Revision Rink

Game reference

April 10, 2013; 8:45 pm	Lindenwood	7 – 2	UC Santa Barbara	Fort Myers Skatium, Fort Myers; Mission Rink

Game reference

April 10, 2013; 9:45 pm NCRHA Radio Network	UNLV	7 – 7	Eastern Michigan	Fort Myers Skatium, Fort Myers; Revision Rink

Game reference

April 11, 2013; 4:30 pm	UC Santa Barbara	3 – 9	Eastern Michigan	Fort Myers Skatium, Fort Myers; Mission Rink

Game reference

April 11, 2013; 5:30 pm	Lindenwood	8 – 0	UNLV	Fort Myers Skatium, Fort Myers; Mission Rink

Game reference

=== Pool B ===
Seed	Team	GP	W	L	T	GF	GA	PTS
1	Michigan State	3	2	1	0	12	5	4
2	Bethel	3	1	1	1	11	10	3
3	Neumann	3	1	1	1	9	11	3
4	Long Beach State	3	1	2	0	10	16	2

April 10, 2013; 2:15 pm NCRHA Radio Network	Bethel	0 – 4	Michigan State	Fort Myers Skatium, Fort Myers; Mission Rink

Game reference

April 10, 2013; 3:15 pm NCRHA Radio Network	Long Beach State	3 – 5	Neumann	Fort Myers Skatium, Fort Myers; Mission Rink

Game reference

April 10, 2013; 8:45 pm NCRHA Radio Network	Neumann	3 – 3	Bethel	Fort Myers Skatium, Fort Myers; Revision Rink

Game reference

April 10, 2013; 9:45 pm	Michigan State	3 – 4	Long Beach State	Fort Myers Skatium, Fort Myers; Mission Rink

Game reference

April 11, 2013; 4:30 pm NCRHA Radio Network	Michigan State	5 – 1	Neumann	Fort Myers Skatium, Fort Myers; Revision Rink

Game reference

April 11, 2013; 5:30 pm NCRHA Radio Network	Long Beach State	3 – 8	Bethel	Fort Myers Skatium, Fort Myers; Revision Rink

Game reference

=== Pool C ===
Seed	Team	GP	W	L	T	GF	GA	PTS
1	Grand Valley State	3	3	0	0	19	2	6
2	George Mason	3	1	1	1	10	16	3
3	Illinois	3	1	2	0	10	13	2
4	West Chester	3	0	2	1	10	18	1

April 10, 2013; 12:15 pm	West Chester	5 – 5	George Mason	Fort Myers Skatium, Fort Myers; Revision Rink

Game reference

April 10, 2013; 1:15 pm	Grand Valley State	5 – 0	Illinois	Fort Myers Skatium, Fort Myers; Revision Rink

Game reference

April 10, 2013; 6:30 pm	George Mason	0 – 9	Grand Valley State	Fort Myers Skatium, Fort Myers; Mission Rink

Game reference

April 10, 2013; 7:30 pm	Illinois	8 – 3	West Chester	Fort Myers Skatium, Fort Myers; Revision Rink

Game reference

April 11, 2013; 12:15 pm	George Mason	5 – 2	Illinois	Fort Myers Skatium, Fort Myers; Mission Rink

Game reference

April 11, 2013; 1:15 pm NCRHA Radio Network	Grand Valley State	5 – 2	West Chester	Fort Myers Skatium, Fort Myers; Mission Rink

Game reference

=== Pool D ===
Seed	Team	GP	W	L	T	GF	GA	PTS
1	Cal Poly	3	3	0	0	16	6	6
2	UMSL	3	1	1	1	15	8	3
3	Hofstra	3	1	1	1	9	12	3
4	Florida Gulf Coast	3	0	3	0	8	22	0

April 10, 2013; 12:15 pm	UMSL	3 – 3	Hofstra	Fort Myers Skatium, Fort Myers; Mission Rink

Game reference

April 10, 2013; 1:15 pm NCRHA Radio Network	Cal Poly	6 – 4	Florida Gulf Coast	Fort Myers Skatium, Fort Myers; Mission Rink

Game reference

April 10, 2013; 6:30 pm NCRHA Radio Network	Florida Gulf Coast	1 – 10	UMSL	Fort Myers Skatium, Fort Myers; Revision Rink

Game reference

April 10, 2013; 7:30 pm	Hofstra	0 – 6	Cal Poly	Fort Myers Skatium, Fort Myers; Mission Rink

Game reference

April 11, 2013; 2:15 pm	Cal Poly	4 – 2	UMSL	Fort Myers Skatium, Fort Myers; Revision Rink

Game reference

April 11, 2013; 3:15 pm	Hofstra	6 – 3	Florida Gulf Coast	Fort Myers Skatium, Fort Myers; Revision Rink

Game reference

=== Pool E ===
Seed	Team	GP	W	L	T	GF	GA	PTS
1	Arizona State	3	3	0	0	25	2	6
2	East Carolina	3	1	1	1	15	8	3
3	Ohio State	3	1	1	1	16	19	3
4	Texas Tech	3	0	3	0	5	28	0

April 10, 2013; 4:30 pm	Arizona State	6 – 1	East Carolina	Fort Myers Skatium, Fort Myers; Revision Rink

Game reference

April 10, 2013; 5:30 pm NCRHA Radio Network	Texas Tech	4 – 7	Ohio State	Fort Myers Skatium, Fort Myers; Revision Rink

Game reference

April 10, 2013; 11:45 pm	Ohio State	1 – 7	Arizona State	Fort Myers Skatium, Fort Myers; Mission Rink

Game reference

April 10, 2013; 11:45 pm	East Carolina	9 – 1	Texas Tech	Fort Myers Skatium, Fort Myers; Revision Rink

Game reference

April 11, 2013; 2:15 pm NCRHA Radio Network	Ohio State	8 – 8	East Carolina	Fort Myers Skatium, Fort Myers; Mission Rink

Game reference

April 11, 2013; 3:15 pm	Arizona State	12 – 0	Texas Tech	Fort Myers Skatium, Fort Myers; Mission Rink

Game reference

=== Pool F ===
Seed	Team	GP	W	L	T	GF	GA	PTS
1	Central Florida	3	3	0	0	19	9	6
2	North Texas	3	1	2	0	13	13	2
3	Brockport	3	1	2	0	14	16	2
4	Pittsburgh	3	1	2	0	11	19	2

April 10, 2013; 4:30 pm	North Texas	6 – 3	Brockport	Fort Myers Skatium, Fort Myers; Mission Rink

Game reference

April 10, 2013; 5:30 pm	Central Florida	7 – 3	Pittsburgh	Fort Myers Skatium, Fort Myers; Mission Rink

Game reference

April 10, 2013; 10:45 pm	Pittsburgh	6 – 4	North Texas	Fort Myers Skatium, Fort Myers; Mission Rink

Game reference

April 10, 2013; 10:45 pm	Brockport	3 – 8	Central Florida	Fort Myers Skatium, Fort Myers; Revision Rink

Game reference

April 11, 2013; 12:15 pm	North Texas	3 – 4	Central Florida	Fort Myers Skatium, Fort Myers; Revision Rink

Game reference

April 11, 2013; 1:15 pm	Pittsburgh	2 – 8	Brockport	Fort Myers Skatium, Fort Myers; Revision Rink

== Elimination bracket ==
First Round; Preliminary Round; April 11
D4	Florida Gulf Coast	4
E1	Arizona State	5
C1	Grand Valley State	2
F4	Pittsburgh	6
C3	Illinois	6
F2	North Texas	0
D2	UMSL	7
E3	Ohio State	2
C4	West Chester	3
F1	Central Florida	5
D1	Cal Poly	12
E4	Texas Tech	1
D3	Hofstra	6
E2	East Carolina	3
C2	George Mason	11
F3	Brockport	2

Second Round; Sweet Sixteen; April 12
A1	Lindenwood	6
E1	Arizona State	5
B4	Long Beach State	7
F4	Pittsburgh	3
B2	Bethel	2
C3	Illinois	1
A3	UNLV	5
D2	UMSL	1
B1	Michigan State	9
F1	Central Florida	2
A4	UC Santa Barbara	6
D1	Cal Poly	4
A2	Eastern Michigan	3
D3	Hofstra	1
B3	Neumann	8
C2	George Mason	2

National Quarterfinals; Elite Eight; April 12
A1	Lindenwood	9
B4	Long Beach State	3
B2	Bethel	3
A3	UNLV	6
B1	Michigan State	8
A4	UC Santa Barbara	3
A2	Eastern Michigan	4
B3	Neumann	8

National Semifinals; Final Four; April 13
A1	Lindenwood	4
A3	UNLV	1
B1	Michigan State	7
B3	Neumann	4

National Championship; Game; April 13
A1	Lindenwood	6
B1	Michigan State	2

Note: * denotes overtime period(s)
All times are local (UTC−4).

=== First round ===
April 11, 2013; 6:30 pm	(C1) Grand Valley State	2 – 6	(F4) Pittsburgh	Fort Myers Skatium, Fort Myers; Mission Rink

Game reference

April 11, 2013; 6:30 pm	(C2) George Mason	11 – 2	(F3) Brockport	Fort Myers Skatium, Fort Myers; Revision Rink

Game reference

April 11, 2013; 7:30 pm	(C3) Illinois	6 – 0	(F2) North Texas	Fort Myers Skatium, Fort Myers; Mission Rink

Game reference

April 11, 2013; 7:30 pm	(C4) West Chester	3 – 5	(F1) Central Florida	Fort Myers Skatium, Fort Myers; Revision Rink

Game reference

April 11, 2013; 8:45 pm	(D4) Florida Gulf Coast	4 – 5	(E1) Arizona State	Fort Myers Skatium, Fort Myers; Mission Rink

Game reference

April 11, 2013; 8:45 pm NCRHA Radio Network	(D3) UMSL	7 – 2	(E2) Ohio State	Fort Myers Skatium, Fort Myers; Revision Rink

Game reference

April 11, 2013; 9:45 pm	(D1) Cal Poly	12 – 1	(E4) Texas Tech	Fort Myers Skatium, Fort Myers; Mission Rink

Game reference

April 11, 2013; 9:45 pm NCRHA Radio Network	(D2) Hofstra	6 – 3	(E3) East Carolina	Fort Myers Skatium, Fort Myers; Revision Rink

Game reference

=== Second round ===
April 12, 2013; 12:15 pm	(B4) Long Beach State	7 – 3	Pittsburgh	Fort Myers Skatium, Fort Myers; Mission Rink

Game reference

April 12, 2013; 12:15 pm NCRHA Radio Network	(A1) Lindenwood	6 – 5	(E1) Arizona State	Fort Myers Skatium, Fort Myers; Revision Rink

Game reference

April 12, 2013; 1:15 pm	(A3) UNLV	5 – 1	(D2) UMSL	Fort Myers Skatium, Fort Myers; Mission Rink

Game reference

April 12, 2013; 1:15 pm NCRHA Radio Network	(B2) Bethel	2 – 1	(C3) Illinois	Fort Myers Skatium, Fort Myers; Revision Rink

Game reference

April 12, 2013; 2:15 pm	(A4) UC Santa Barbara	6 – 4	(D1) Cal Poly	Fort Myers Skatium, Fort Myers; Mission Rink

Game reference

April 12, 2013; 2:15 pm	(B1) Michigan State	9 – 2	(F1) Central Florida	Fort Myers Skatium, Fort Myers; Revision Rink

Game reference

April 12, 2013; 3:15 pm NCRHA Radio Network	(B3) Neumann	8 – 2	(C2) George Mason	Fort Myers Skatium, Fort Myers; Mission Rink

Game reference

April 12, 2013; 3:15 pm	(A2) Eastern Michigan	3 – 1	(D3) Hofstra	Fort Myers Skatium, Fort Myers; Revision Rink

Game reference

=== National quarterfinals ===
April 12, 2013; 6:30 pm NCRHA Radio Network	(A1) Lindenwood	9 – 3	(B4) Long Beach State	Fort Myers Skatium, Fort Myers; Mission Rink

Game reference

April 12, 2013; 7:30 pm NCRHA Radio Network	(B2) Bethel	3 – 6	(A3) UNLV	Fort Myers Skatium, Fort Myers; Mission Rink

Game reference

April 12, 2013; 8:45 pm NCRHA Radio Network	(B1) Michigan State	8 – 3	(A4) UC Santa Barbara	Fort Myers Skatium, Fort Myers; Mission Rink

Game reference

April 12, 2013; 9:45 pm NCRHA Radio Network	(B3) Neumann	4 – 8	(A2) Eastern Michigan	Fort Myers Skatium, Fort Myers; Mission Rink

Game reference

=== National semifinals ===
April 13, 2013; 12:15 pm NCRHA Radio Network	(A1) Lindenwood	4 – 1	(A3) UNLV	Fort Myers Skatium, Fort Myers; Mission Rink

Game reference

April 13, 2013; 1:15 pm NCRHA Radio Network	(B1) Michigan State	7 – 4	(B3) Neumann	Fort Myers Skatium, Fort Myers; Mission Rink

Game reference

=== National championship ===
April 13, 2013; 7:30 pm NCRHA Radio Network	(A1) Lindenwood	6 – 2	(B1) Michigan State	Fort Myers Skatium, Fort Myers; Mission Rink

Game reference

== See also ==
- 2013 National Collegiate Roller Hockey Championships Division II
- 2013 National Collegiate Roller Hockey Championships Junior College Division
- 2013 National Collegiate Roller Hockey Championships B Division
