= Fredda Witherspoon =

American educator and activist (1923 or 1924–1996)

Fredda Witherspoon (1923 or 1924–1996), formerly Fredda Crawford, was an educator and activist in St. Louis, Missouri. She was also known for her close ties to the community, serving as the president of the Missouri Conference of the NAACP and as vice chair of the St. Louis Urban League.

== Life ==
Witherspoon, born Fredda Crawford, was the daughter of Vanita Crawford and Missouri Pacific Railroad worker R. E. Crawford. She graduated valedictorian from Booker T. Washington High School and continued her education at Bishop College, later earning a business degree from Hughes Business School. Committed to advancing her education even further, Witherspoon completed three master's degrees, in Psychiatric Social Work, Psychology, and Guidance and Counseling, from the University of Chicago. She received her last degree, a PhD in Guidance and Counseling, from Washington University in St. Louis. After the completion of her PhD, Witherspoon moved to St. Louis permanently.

Witherspoon translated her love of education into a profession. She taught at Forest Park Community College for twenty-seven years and served as the children's youth director at the West Side Baptist Church. She often explained that it was a necessity to put her intellectual creativity to good use, particularly within her local community. Her personal motto exemplified this line of thought: "Everyone should do all the good she can as she passes along life's highway; time is fleeing and life is too short to be unkind and thoughtless; we pass this way but once."

Fredda Witherspoon married Robert Witherspoon after moving to St. Louis. The couple had a son, Robert "Bob" Witherspoon, and a daughter, who was named after her mother, Vanita.

== Activism ==
Fredda Witherspoon is best known for helping to spark the ignition that ultimately led to "Shelley v. Kramer" in 1948. Her husband, Robert Witherspoon, was an attorney working in St. Louis. He and his wife pushed for the desegregation of Lewis Place, an African-American private street in St. Louis. Like many other residential areas in the 1940s, Lewis Place used restrictive covenants to enforce segregation in the neighborhood. Fredda and Robert Witherspoon convinced a group of fair-skinned African-Americans to purchase houses in Lewis place and vote against the covenants. This act furthered the overarching legal battle over racially restrictive covenants and pushed the Supreme Court to overturn the constitutionality of these covenants across the United States.
