= Myrtle Dorsey =

American academic

Myrtle E. Dorsey served as chancellor at St. Louis Community College from 2011 to 2013.

== Education ==
Dorsey attended Morgan State University, where she earned her bachelor's and master's degrees. She earned her doctorate from the University of Texas at Austin in the Community College Leadership program.

== Career ==
Dorsey began her career in higher education as a reading specialist at Bowie State University and the University of Maryland.

In 2002, Dorsey was appointed chancellor of Baton Rouge Community College (BRCC). She led the college through its first Southern Association of Colleges and Schools (SACS) accreditation and received approval to offer financial aid at the college. BRCC is currently the third-largest institute of higher learning in Louisiana.

In 2011, Dorsey was appointed chancellor of St. Louis Community College. She served as the chief executive officer of a multi-campus college system consisting of four campuses, two satellite centers, and two centers focused on workforce needs. St. Louis Community College is the largest community college district in Missouri and the state's second-largest higher education system. The college annually serves more than 81,000 students through credit courses, continuing education and workforce development programs.

In September 2013 the board of trustees chose not to renew her contract due in part to a report prepared by the St. Louis law firm of Armstrong Teasdale LLP on the handling of an incident in April in which a student was attacked at the college's Meramec campus. On April 18, student Jevon Mallory was allegedly caught choking fellow student Blythe Grupe in a women's bathroom on the Meramec campus. Despite Mallory's admission that he was attempting to “withdraw her from life,” campus officials released him within hours, didn't alert the campus to the threat, and addressed the assault only after the victim went public. A report by Armstrong Teasdale said the way it was handled showed “a lack in leadership and management from key personnel at the district and campus levels.” The college's board of trustees hired the law firm to investigate after a community-wide furor erupted over the handling of the assault.
