= Joe Right =

American soccer player

Personal information
- Full name: Joseph Right
- Date of birth: July 26, 1950 (age 76)
- Place of birth: St. Louis, Missouri, U.S.
- Position: Goalkeeper

Youth career
- 1969: Florissant Valley Community College

Senior career*
Years	Team	Apps	(Gls)
1970–1971	St. Louis Stars	18	(0)
- * Club domestic league appearances and goals

Joe Right is an American retired soccer goalkeeper who played three seasons in the North American Soccer League.

Right attended Florissant Valley Community College for at least one year. In 1969, he was part of the FVCC National Junior College National Championships. He was also a 1969 NJCAA All American. In 1970, he signed with the St. Louis Stars of the North American Soccer League. He played thirteen games for the Stars in 1970, but only five in 1971. Following the 1971 season, he left the Stars and the NASL.

He was inducted into the St. Louis Soccer Hall of Fame in 2008.
