= Dorathea Davis =

American politician

Dorathea Seebeck Davis (October 2, 1951 - December 8, 2005) was an American Democratic politician who served in the Missouri House of Representatives.

Born in St. Louis, Missouri, she attended De Sales High School and Forest Park Community College. Her husband Lanny L. Davis died in 2016.
