= St. Louis Community College–Forest Park =

Public college in St. Louis, Missouri, US

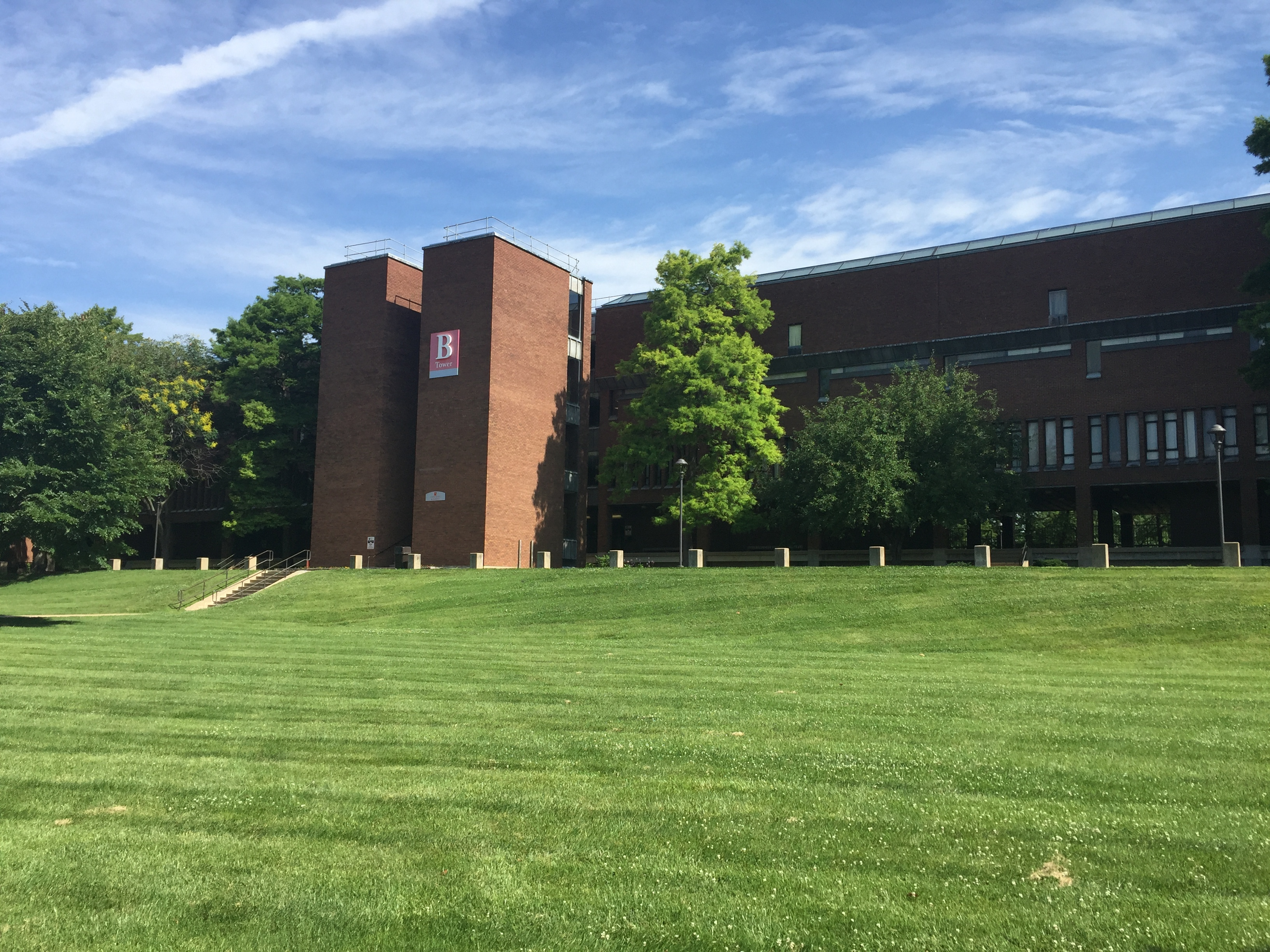
- Former name: Forest Park Community College (1967–1976)
- Type: Public community college campus
- Established: 1967; 59 years ago
- Parent institution: STLCC
- President: Julie Fickas
- Students: 8,207
- Location: 5600 Oakland Ave, St. Louis, Missouri, 63110, U.S. 38.6295°N 90.2786°W
- Campus: Urban
- Website: stlcc.edu/locations/forest-park

St. Louis Community College–Forest Park (commonly known as STLCC–Forest Park or simply Forest Park) is a public community college campus in St. Louis, Missouri. It is one of the four campuses of St. Louis Community College. Over 8,200 students attend Forest Park, making it the second largest community college in Missouri.

== History ==
Before Forest Park existed, its campus had been the site of an amusement park known as Forest Park Highlands. The park opened in the late 19th century, and was destroyed in July 1963 by a major fire that started at one of the park's restaurants.

Two years after a $47.2 million bond was approved to pay for its construction as part of the new Junior College District (JCD), classes began at Forest Park Community College in 1967. In 1976, the JCD changed the school's name to St. Louis Community College–Forest Park.

In 1999, the Jack E. Miller Hospitality Studies Center opened at Forest Park, with "state-of-the-art facilities for culinary arts".

On September 24, 2009, a suspicious package was found in a men's restroom in the D Building. It was removed by the St. Louis Police Department Bomb and Arson Squad. The next day, the police announced that the package had contained a live bomb and would have caused "moderate to heavy damage" if it had exploded.

The campus is home to the Mildred E. Bastian Center for the Performance Arts, although it has been closed since 2023.

== Campus ==
Forest Park is an urban campus, located next to I-64/U.S. Route 40 in the Forest Park area of St. Louis. The campus is close to two MetroLink Light rail stations at Forest Park-DeBaliviere and Central West End.

== Programs ==
Forest Park is known for its allied health care education. Associate in Applied Science Degrees offered include: Nursing, Radiologic Technology, Dental Hygiene, Dental Assisting, Respiratory Therapy Polysomnography, and Clinical Laboratory Technology.

The college offers a number of construction-related degrees in Automotive Technology, Building Inspection & Code Enforcement Technology, Plumbing Design Engineering Technology, and Fire Protection Technology.

The Jack Miller Hospitality Studies Program prepares students for the hospitality industry, including programs in Culinary Arts, Baking and Pastry Arts and Hotel Management. Practical culinary courses include intense studies in the process of making chocolate.

Class A and Class B commercial driver's license (CDL) courses are offered, with driver training facilities on campus.

An associate degree program in Funeral Services is offered.

== Athletics ==
St. Louis Community College operates as a single entity in athletic competition; Forest Park students are permitted to participate if eligible. The school's teams compete in the National Junior College Athletic Association (NJCAA) as part of the Missouri Community College Athletic Conference.

Forest Park serves as home court for both men and women's basketball teams.

St. Louis Community College teams are known as the Archers. Prior to St. Louis Community College consolidating athletic programs under one banner, Forest Park athletic teams were known as the Highlanders.

== Notable people ==
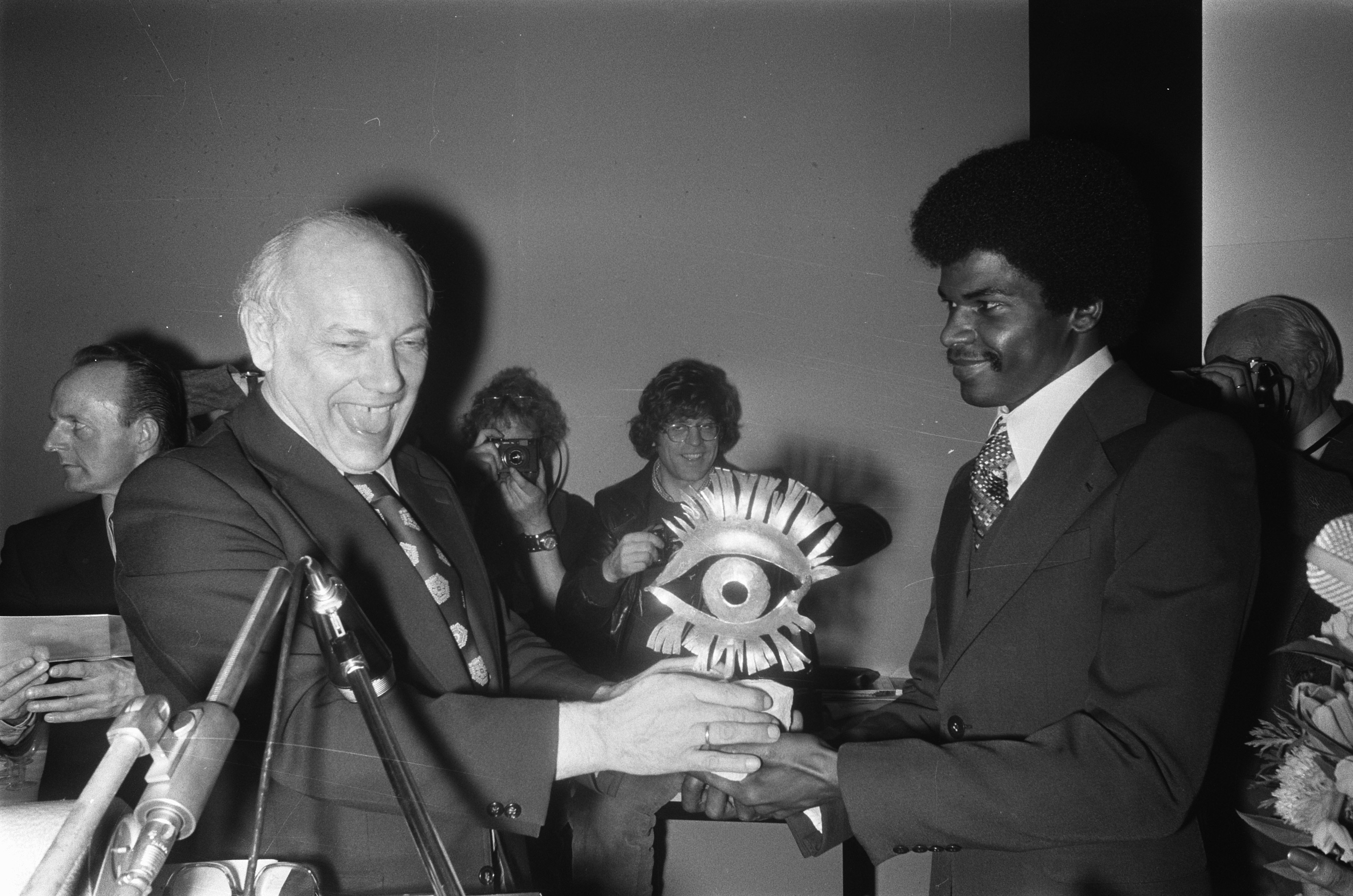
Ovie Carter (right) receiving the Pulitzer Prize for International Reporting, 1975

=== Alumni ===
- Ovie Carter, photographer
- Daniel Comeaux, chief of police of the Dallas Police Department
- Dorathea Davis, former member of the Missouri House of Representatives
- Daniel Isom, former commissioner of the St. Louis Metropolitan Police Department
- Dennis Jenkerson. commissioner of the St. Louis Fire Department
- Terry Kennedy, former clerk of the St. Louis Board of Aldermen
- Christina Machamer, chef
- Josh Outman, former Major League Baseball player.
- Bruce Sassmann, former member of the Missouri House of Representatives

=== Faculty ===
- Ethel Sawyer Adolphe, professor
- Jim Bokern, soccer coach
- Leila Daw, professor
- Tracy D. Hall, vice president of Academic Affairs
- Darin Hendrickson, baseball coach
- Jason James, assistant basketball coach
- Gary Rensing, soccer coach
- Norris Stevenson, track and field coach
- Fredda Witherspoon, professor
