= Southwest Tennessee Community College =

Public college in Memphis, Tennessee, US

- Type: Public community college
- Established: Consolidation completed July 1, 2000
- Parent institution: Tennessee Board of Regents
- Accreditation: SACSCOC
- President: Tracy D. Hall
- Faculty: 164 full-time and 182 part-time (fall 2023)
- Students: 6,980 (fall 2023)
- Location: Memphis, Tennessee, U.S.
- Campus: Urban
- Nickname: Saluqis
- Website: www.southwest.tn.edu

Southwest Tennessee Community College is a public community college in Memphis, Tennessee. As the product of a merger between two colleges in 2000, the school has two campuses in Memphis and several satellite centers. The Tennessee Board of Regents operates it.

== History ==
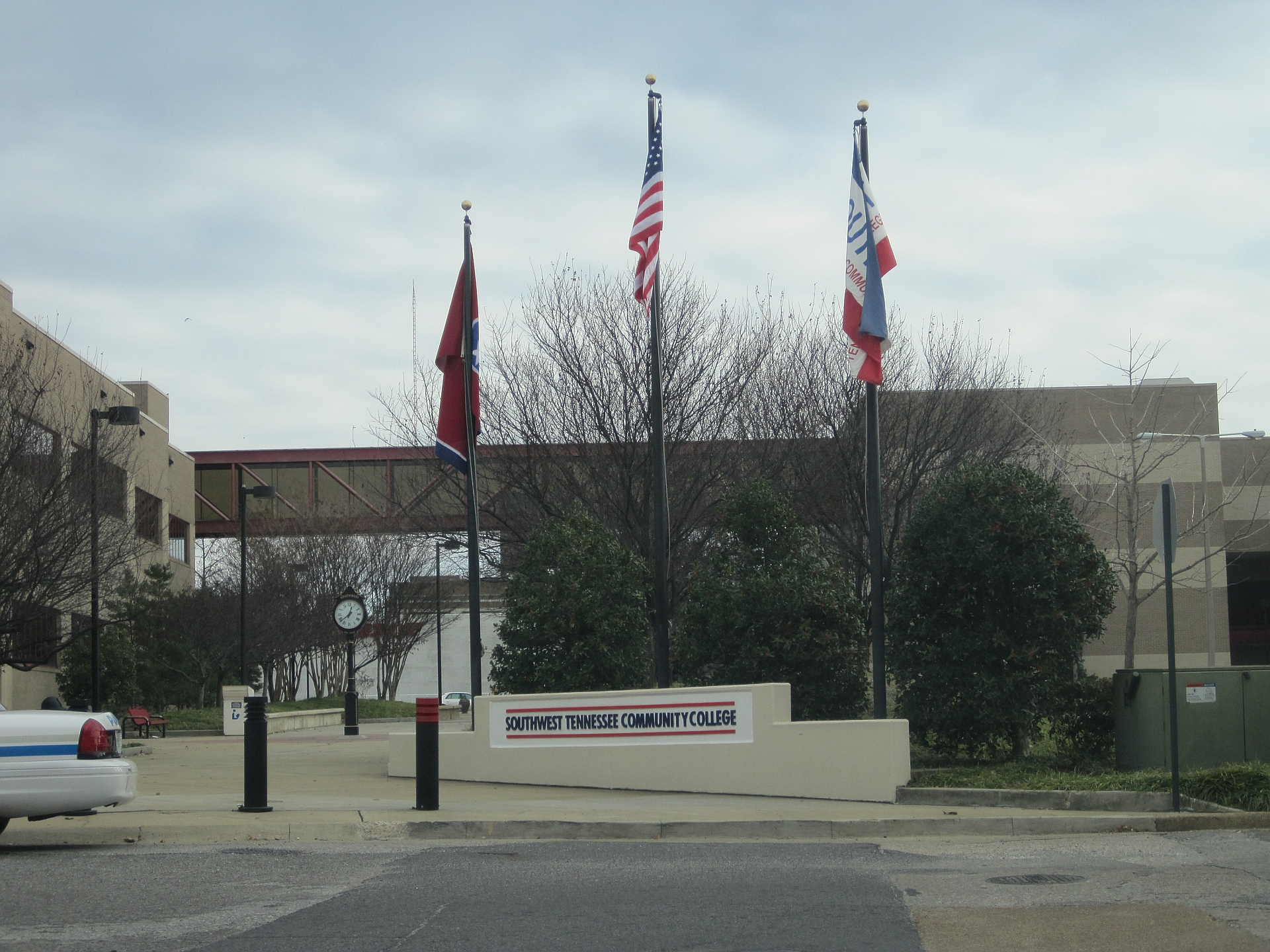
Union Ave campus

Southwest was formed on July 1, 2000, by a merger between Shelby State Community College and the State Technical Institute at Memphis ("STIM"). Nathan Essex, the school's founding president, announced in 2014 that he would retire the next summer.

== Campuses ==
Southwest has four locations throughout the Mid-South:

- Macon Cove Campus- located in Northeast Memphis.
- Union Avenue Campus- located in Downtown Memphis.
  - Medical District High School is located in Building E.
- Maxine A. Smith Center- located in Southeast Memphis.
- Whitehaven Center- located in Whitehaven.

Southwest previously had a campus located in Frayser but sold it to Libertas School of Memphis in 2024 due to declining enrollment.

== Academics ==
Southwest offers more than 140 programs and has an agreement with LeMoyne–Owen College to make transferring easier. Southwest also offers an associate degree in aviation operations technology with three career tracks: pilot, flight dispatch, and aviation administration.
