= Ernest Lynn Waldorf =

American bishop (1876–1943)

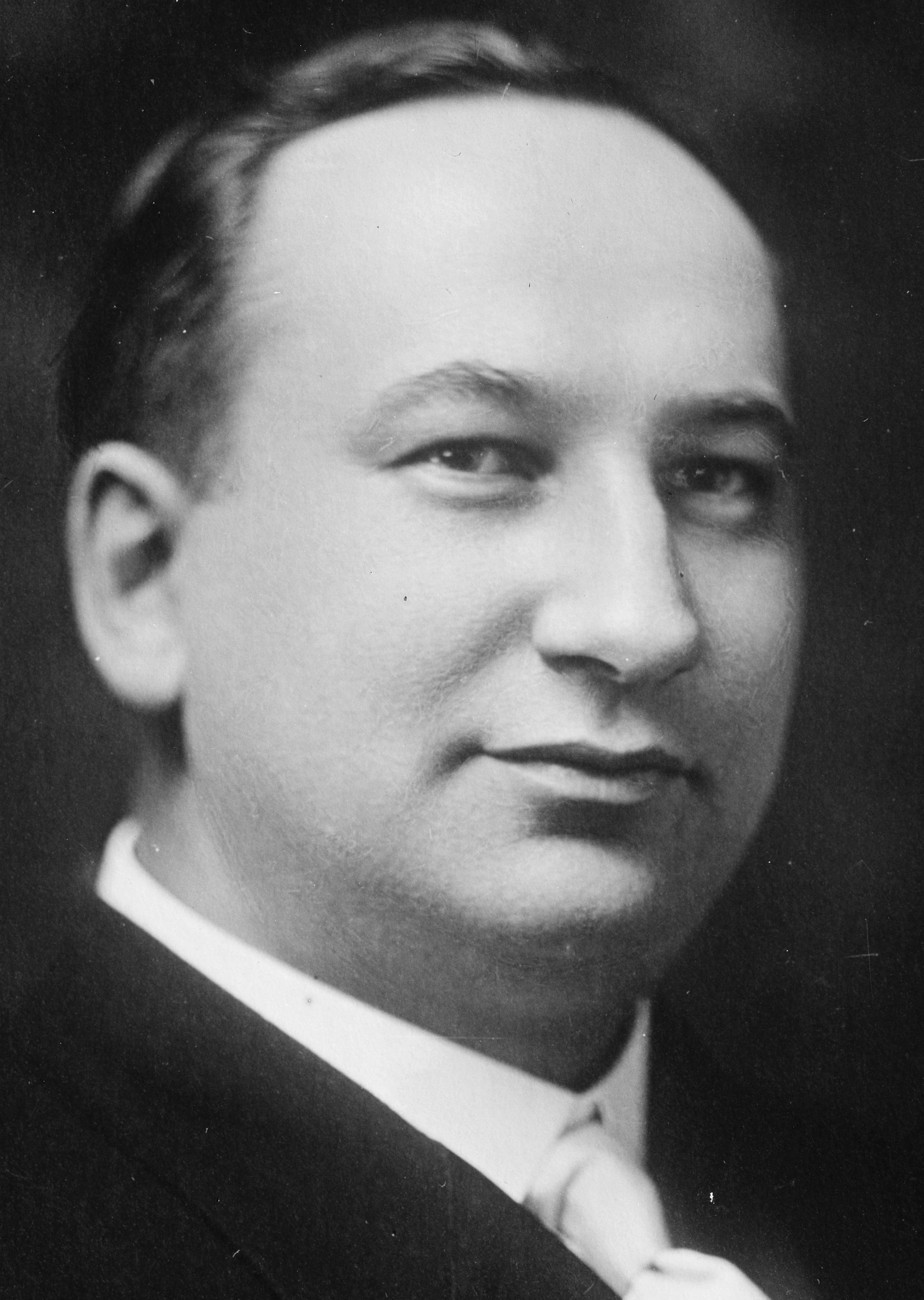
Ernest Lynn Waldorf

Ernest Lynn Waldorf (May 14, 1876 – July 27, 1943) was an American bishop of the Methodist Episcopal Church, elected in 1920.

He was born on a farm in the South Valley, Otsego County, New York. Waldorf united with the Central New York Annual Conference of the M.E. Church in 1900. Prior to his election to the episcopacy, Waldorf served as a pastor, and as a chaplain in the 74th Regt. of the National Guard in Buffalo, New York, 1911–15.

His son was football coach Pappy Waldorf.

While a bishop in Kansas City, Missouri, in the 1920s, he championed a proposed Lincoln and Lee University that would be built on the battlefield of the Battle of Westport (biggest battle west of the Mississippi River). The university would be named for Abraham Lincoln and Robert E. Lee and be built around a proposed national memorial to fallen Civil War soldiers. The school would eventually form the basis of what is the University of Missouri-Kansas City (and is not affiliated with the church).

He offered invocations at the 1928 Republican National Convention (fourth day, June 15, 1928) and the 1936 Republican National Convention (second day, June 10, 1936).

He died after a few months' illness, on July 27, 1943, in the Noble Foundation Hospital, Alexandria Bay, New York. He was buried in Oakwood Cemetery in Syracuse, New York.

== Selected writings ==
- Sermons, Addresses and Radio Talks, typed mss., in the Methodist Bishops' Collection at Perkins School of Theology, Southern Methodist University
- Address: "Riches," Book of the Sesqui-Centennial of American Methodism, 1934
- The Use of Hardship, Sermons By the Sea, 1939

== See also ==
- List of bishops of the United Methodist Church
