= St. Louis Community College–Wildwood =

Public college in Wildwood, Missouri, US

- Type: Public community college campus
- Established: 2007; 19 years ago
- Parent institution: STLCC
- Provost: Steven Collins
- Students: 2,000
- Location: Wildwood, Missouri, U.S. 38.5746°N 90.6484°W
- Campus: Suburban
- Website: stlcc.edu/locations/wildwood

St. Louis Community College–Wildwood (commonly known as STLCC–Wildwood, or simply Wildwood) is the newest campus of STLCC. The campus is located in Wildwood, Missouri, a western suburb of St. Louis, Missouri.

== History ==
The college opened in August 2007. The Wildwood campus was created because of the rapidly growing population of west St. Louis County and to relieve some of the pressures from STLCC-Meramec's growing and overcapacity 12,000-13,000 student population.

== Campus ==
The Wildwood campus is located off Route 109 and Route 100 in West St. Louis County. Wildwood is state-of-the-art; it the first Green campus in Missouri built with environmentally friendly materials. The architecture of the building is also designed to enhance the health of the students and faculty using the facilities. The main campus 75,000-square-foot (7,000 m^{2}) building houses high-tech classrooms and labs, a library and bookstore, student services, lounges, a multipurpose room and rooms equipped with sophisticated presentation and Web-based technologies.

== Academics ==
Wildwood currently offers associate degrees in three areas of study: General Transfer Studies, Business Administration, and Teaching.

Beginning in the Spring 2008 semester UM–St Louis began offering classes at Wildwood for students to begin taking classes at Wildwood and then make an easy transfer after the second year into the main UMSL campus.

== Athletics ==
STLCC operates as a single entity in athletic competition; Wildwood students are permitted to participate if eligible.
