= Missouri State University–West Plains =

Community college in West Plains, Missouri, U.S.

Coordinates: 36°43′47″N 91°51′28″W

- Type: Public
- Established: 1963
- Affiliation: Missouri State University
- Location: West Plains, Missouri
- Website: Missouri State University - West Plains Homepage

Missouri State University–West Plains is a public community college in West Plains, Missouri. It is a separately accredited campus of Missouri State University awarding two-year degrees. The fall 2023 enrollment was 1,772 students. Established in 1963, Missouri State University–West Plains has an open enrollment policy. It has an extended campus in Mountain Grove. Although the college is accredited by the Higher Learning Commission, it was placed on probation in July 2024 for not meeting HLC criteria related to academic rigor and quality.

== Academics ==
The institution offers three associate degrees: Associate of Arts, Associate of Science, and Associate of Applied Science.

== Student life ==
Missouri State University–West Plains offers a variety of activities for students, including Student Government Association, study-abroad programs and student organizations. Students can work out or play sports in the West Plains Civic Center gym or the Student Recreation Center, and can experience the arts at the programs featured at the Civic Center.

== Athletics ==
Missouri State-West Plains Grizzlies athletics include baseball, women's volleyball, men's basketball, softball, rodeo, e-sports, and co-ed cheer teams. MSU-West Plains' athletic facilities include the West Plains Civic Center Arena and Richards Field. The school competes in the Missouri Community College Athletic Conference.

== Housing ==
The Grizzly House is Missouri State-West Plains' University's first residential facility, located in the heart of campus on Trish Knight Street. On January 1, 2017, the Shoe Factory Lofts, 665 Missouri Ave., in West Plains, became Grizzly Lofts, and Missouri State-West Plains manage the facility, which can accommodate 274 students.
