= St. Louis Community College–Meramec =

College in Kirkwood, Missouri, U.S.

- Former name: Meramec Community College (1972–1976)
- Type: Public community college campus
- Established: 1972; 54 years ago
- Parent institution: STLCC
- Students: 12,000
- Location: Kirkwood, Missouri, U.S. 38.5684°N 90.4205°W
- Campus: Suburban
- Website: stlcc.edu/locations/meramec

St. Louis Community College–Meramec (commonly known as STLCC–Meramec or simply Meramec) is a Community college campus Kirkwood, Missouri. Meramec is the largest community college in Missouri with over 12,000 undergraduate and transfer students. Along with the 78-acre (31.6 ha) main campus in Kirkwood, Meramec operates one satellite campus in South St. Louis County - Meramec's South County Education and University Center. The college is named after the Meramec River that meanders through central Missouri before emptying into the Mississippi River at the border between St. Louis and Jefferson Counties.

== History ==
St. Joseph College opened in 1889 on the site of the present day STLCC–Meramec campus. The school was a small private Catholic college from 1889 until the early 1960s. When the college closed the land was redeveloped into the modern STLCC campus.

== Academics ==
Meramec has many programs of study and offers a wide variety of associate degrees, some of the most popular being Business, Accounting, Music, Finance, Supply Chain Management, and Education. Meramec also has an extensive Horticulture program; the gardens and greenhouses can be seen on the southwestern part of campus from Big Bend Road. The student newspaper, the Montage, has won the MCMA-Missouri College Media Association's best two-year college newspaper in Missouri.

== Athletics ==
STLCC operates as a single entity in athletic competition; Meramec students are permitted to participate if eligible.

Meramec serves as the "home field" for Men's Baseball, Women's Soccer, Women's Softball and Women's Volleyball.

Prior to STLCC consolidating all athletic programs under one banner, STLCC-Meramec participated under the name Magic.

== Notable alumni ==
- Zak Cummings, 2x NJCAA Wrestling National Qualifier; former professional mixed martial artist for the UFC's Welterweight Division
- David Freese (2002–03), former Major League Baseball player for the Los Angeles Dodgers and St. Louis Cardinals, 2011 NLCS and 2011 World Series MVP with the Cardinals
- Jason High, 2x National Wrestling Championship qualifier; current mixed martial artist formerly for the Ultimate Fighting Championship
- Michael Johnson (fighter), wrestler; The Ultimate Fighter 12 finalist, MMA fighter, currently competing in the Lightweight division of the UFC
