= East Central College =

Community college in central Missouri, U.S.

- Former name: East Central Junior College (1968–88)
- Type: Public community college
- Established: 1968
- Accreditation: HLC
- President: Jon Bauer
- Faculty: 242 in 2013-2014
- Students: 2,629 in 2018
- Location: Union, Missouri, United States; 38°25′52″N 90°58′38″W
- Campus: Union (Main Campus), Washington and Rolla.
- Colors: Royal blue and Vegas gold
- Mascot: Falcon
- Website: eastcentral.edu

East Central College (ECC) is a public community college with its main campus in Union, Missouri. It also offers classes in Rolla and Washington. Approximately 2,100 students are enrolled in classes each semester. ECC is accredited by the Higher Learning Commission.

== History ==
East Central College was founded in 1968 to serve the educational needs of the people in east central Missouri. In that same year 114 acres (46.1 ha) were purchased for what is now the main campus.

Classes began in rented facilities at the Union Memorial Auditorium in September 1969 with enrollment of 476 students the first semester. The Administration Building was the first facility built on campus, and it was completed in 1971. The Multipurpose Building came next in 1973, followed by the Vocational-Technical Building in 1978 and the Classroom Building in 1985. The Auditorium/Classroom facility was completed in 1998. The Health & Science Building with almost 52,000 square feet (4,831 m^{2}) of space, was completed in January 2009. The Administration Building was completely renovated in 2011. The facility was renamed Buescher Hall and was dedicated October 30, 2011, to honor George H. Buescher, who was instrumental in the establishment of the college and served as the first president of the board of trustees. That 61,166-square-foot (5,683 m^{2}) building houses the Library, Learning Center, Student Service Center, classrooms and offices.

== Academics ==
East Central College offers four transfer oriented degrees: The Associate of Arts (AA), Associate of Science (AS) designed for individuals interested in pre-engineering, Associate of Fine Arts (AFA) and the Associate of Arts in Teaching (AAT). Those four programs are designed for individuals who plan to complete the freshman and sophomore years of college at East Central and then transfer to a four-year college or university to pursue a bachelor's degree.

The Associate of Applied Science (AAS) and career/technical certificate programs are designed for individuals who plan to enter the workforce after completing the appropriate classes at ECC.

== Athletics ==
ECC competes as member of the NJCAA in the Missouri Community College Athletic Conference. Since 2008, ECC's sports teams have been known as the East Central Falcons. "Rebels" was the original mascot of the college, but the name was dropped due to its ties to the Civil War and the Confederacy. The mascot is named "Franklin" the Falcon.

== Notable alumni ==
- Steve Tappmeyer – basketball coach at UMSL
- Jack Wagner – actor
- Tom Henke – professional baseball pitcher - retired
- Omir Santos – former professional baseball catcher
- John Griesheimer – politician
