= St. Charles Community College =

Public college in St. Charles, Missouri, US

- Former name: St. Charles County Community College (1986–2001)
- Type: Public community college
- Established: 1986; 40 years ago
- Accreditation: Higher Learning Commission
- President: Barbara Kavalier
- Faculty: 82 full-time
- Administrative staff: 241 full-time
- Students: 6,400 (fall 2025)
- Location: St. Charles County, Missouri, United States; 38.761°N 90.641°W
- Campus: Suburban
- Colors: Maroon and gray
- Nickname: Cougars
- Sporting affiliations: NJCAA – MCCAC
- Mascot: Scooter McCougar
- Website: stchas.edu

St. Charles Community College (SCC) is a public community college in St. Charles County, Missouri in the St. Louis metropolitan area. While its main campus is located in Cottleville, its Dardenne Creek campus is located in Dardenne Prairie, and its Technical Campus Wentzville and Innovation Campus West are located in Wentzville. It offers associate degrees and certificate programs in the arts, business, sciences, and career-technical fields as well as workforce training and community-based personal and professional development. St. Charles Community College is accredited by the Higher Learning Commission.

== History ==
On April 1, 1986, voters approved the formation of the St. Charles County Community College district. The first classes were held in June 1987, and classes were held in temporary locations for the next five years. On January 26, 1992, the school's original campus, consisting of four buildings, was completed.

In 2023, SCC began construction on its third campus, the Regional Workforce Innovation Center (RWIC), on 55 acres in Wentzville. Classes opened at RWIC in 2025.

== Academics ==
SCC offers many majors, degrees and certificates.

- Two-year associate degrees
- A transfer program that provides pathways to four-year universities after two years of coursework at SCC
- Certificate programs
- Specialized trainings
- Non-credit courses

== Athletics ==
The school fields four intercollegiate sports teams. Soccer and baseball for men along with soccer and softball for women. St. Charles Community College is a member of the National Junior College Athletic Association and competes at the division I level in all four sports. All four Cougar teams are members of the Missouri Community College Athletic Conference.

== Campuses ==
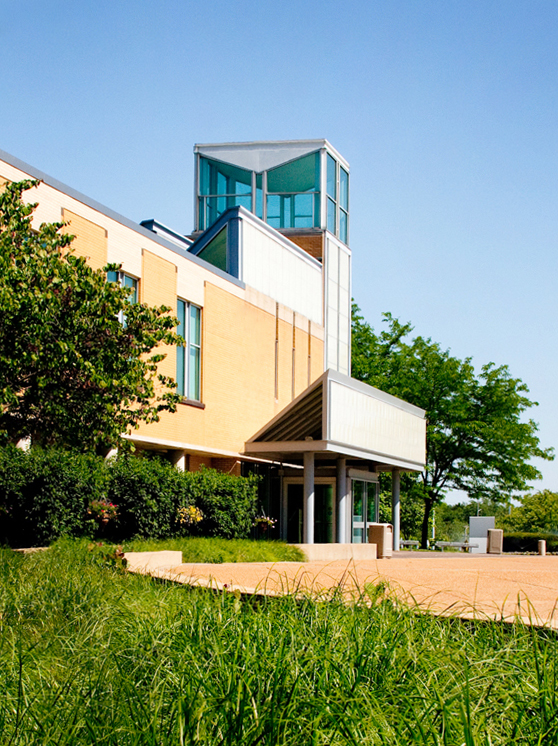
SCC Administration Building houses offices and classrooms on three floors

SCC's main campus on Mid Rivers Mall Drive has 14 buildings connected by a central pedestrian plaza and internal courtyards.

The main campus also features a .67-mile walking and biking trail and a storybook walk presented by St. Charles City-County Library and the SCC Foundation. The trail was completed by Great Rivers Greenway in the fall of 2013 as part of the Dardenne Greenway Trail, linking trails from Legacy Park in Cottleville to Woodlands Sports Park and Rabbit Run Park in St. Peters.

SCC's second campus, the Center for Healthy Living, is located at One Academy Place in Dardenne Prairie. The location houses credit and non-credit programs in healthcare and agriculture.
