= Southeast Missouri State University =

Public university in Cape Girardeau, Missouri, US

Coordinates: 37°18′54.45″N 89°31′45.81″W

- Former names: Southeast Missouri State Normal School (1873–1881); Missouri State Normal School—Third District (1881–1919); Southeast Missouri State Teachers College (1919–1946); Southeast Missouri State College (1946–1973)
- Type: Public university
- Established: 1873; 153 years ago
- Accreditation: HLC
- Endowment: $114 million (2021)
- President: Brad Hodson
- Faculty: 407
- Students: 9,677 (fall 2023)
- Undergraduates: 8,454 (fall 2022)
- Postgraduates: 1,473 (fall 2022)
- Location: Cape Girardeau, Missouri, United States
- Campus: 328 acres (132.7 ha); Small city
- Colors: Red and black
- Nickname: Redhawks
- Sporting affiliations: NCAA Division I FCS – Ohio Valley; MIC
- Mascot: Rowdy the Redhawk
- Website: www.semo.edu

Southeast Missouri State University (Southeast or SEMO) is a public university in Cape Girardeau, Missouri. In addition to the main campus, the university has four regional campuses offering full degree programs and a secondary campus housing the Holland College of Arts and Media. The university is accredited by the Higher Learning Commission.

Enrolling 9,677 students, Southeast offers more than 175 undergraduate degree programs and 75 graduate programs. Originally founded in 1873 as a normal school, the university has a traditional emphasis on teacher education. Five academic units make up the university: the Holland College of Arts and Media; the Harrison College of Business and Computing; the College of Education, Health, and Human Studies; College of Humanities and Social Sciences; and the College of Science, Technology, Engineering, and Mathematics.

The university's thirteen athletics teams compete in the Ohio Valley Conference of NCAA Division I and are known as the Redhawks. The football team competes in the Football Championship Subdivision of Division I.

== History ==
Southeast Missouri State University was founded in 1873 when a group of businessmen and politicians successfully lobbied the State of Missouri to designate Cape Girardeau as the home of the Third District Normal School. Originally known as Southeast Missouri State Normal School, the first classes were taught at the nearby Lorimier School until April 1875, when the first university building was completed.

The university has had five names in its history:

- Southeast Missouri State Normal School, 1873–1881
- Missouri State Normal School—Third District, 1881–1919
- Southeast Missouri State Teachers College, 1919–1946
- Southeast Missouri State College, 1946–1973
- Southeast Missouri State University, 1973–present

The Normal building was described in 1883 by Mark Twain in Life on the Mississippi as "a bright new edifice, picturesquely and peculiarly towered and pinnacled—a sort of gigantic casters, with the cruets all complete." It burned down on April 8, 1902, and was replaced in 1906 by Academic Hall, the school's domed landmark building. Academic Hall was designed by Jerome Bibb Legg, who also designed the St. Louis Exposition and Music Hall, and it includes light fixtures from the 1904 World's Fair. Academic Hall today stands at the center of campus and houses administrative offices, classrooms, and an auditorium.

In 1939, a new library building located near Academic Hall was dedicated. The library was later named Kent Library in 1943 after Sadie Kent, the college's first female librarian "in recognition of her long, faithful and efficient service to the campus." The library originally housed 150,000 books, a museum and a theater roombefore completing an expansion in 1968.

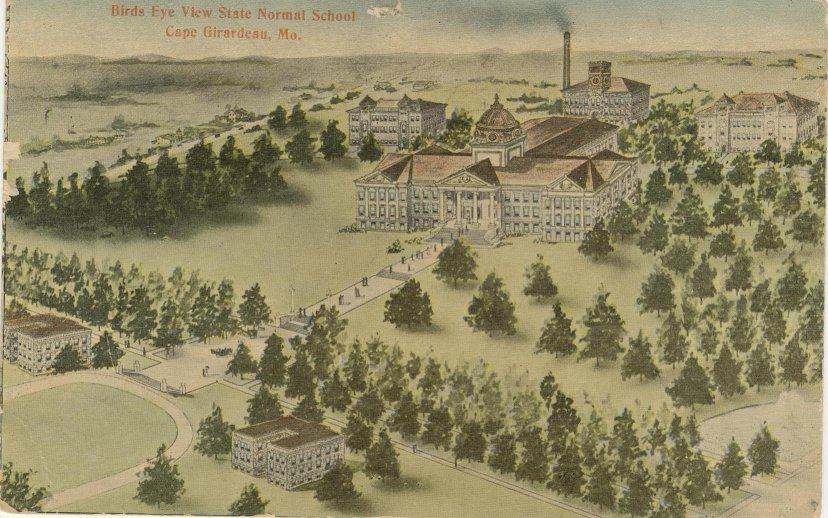
Academic Hall, ca. 1906

In the 1950s, Southeast Missouri State College had an enrollment of approximately 1,600 students. Enrollment steadily increased to more than 7,000 students in the 1970s. The college moved away from its focus on training teachers and began to offer courses of study in business, nursing, and the liberal arts. The size campus grew rapidly in this same period. In 1956, the institution had ten buildings on campus. By 1975, this had increased to twenty-two buildings.

In 1998, the university acquired the former St. Vincent's Seminary located in downtown Cape Girardeau on the Mississippi River. This property has been redeveloped as the River Campus, which opened in Fall 2007 and houses the Earl and Margie Holland School of Visual and Performing Arts. The construction of the River Campus began to shift the institution's focus towards the visual and performing arts, which today forms the basis of the university's statewide reputation.

Missouri State Normal School Third District President John Sephus McGhee established the University Schools on June 15, 1897. This allowed prospective teachers to gain real-world teaching experience while earning their degrees. As the university expanded its curriculum and extra-curricular activities, so did the University Schools. In 1903, as recent construction allowed for more space for university classes, the training school was able to expand its class sizes as well. The University Schools consisted of an elementary, junior high, and high school. The University Schools closed at the end of the 1986–1987 school year due to increasing costs.

=== University presidents ===
1. Lucius H. Cheney (1873–76)
2. Alfred Kirk (1876–77)
3. Charles Henry Dutcher (1877–81)
4. Richard Chapman Norton (1881–93)
5. Willard Duncan Vandiver (1893–97)
6. John Sephus McGhee (1897–99)
7. Washington Strother Dearmont (1899–1921)
8. Joseph Archibald Serena (1921–33)
9. Walter Winfield Parker (1933–56)
10. Mark F. Scully (1956–75)
11. Robert E. Leestamper (1975–79)
12. Bill W. Stacy (1979–89)
13. Robert W. Foster (1989–90)
14. Kala Stroup (1990–95)
15. Bill Atchley (1995–96)
16. Dale F. Nitzschke (1996–99)
17. Kenneth W. Dobbins (1999–2015)
18. Carlos Vargas-Aburto (2015–2025)
19. Brad Hodson (2025–present)

== Campus ==
=== River Campus ===
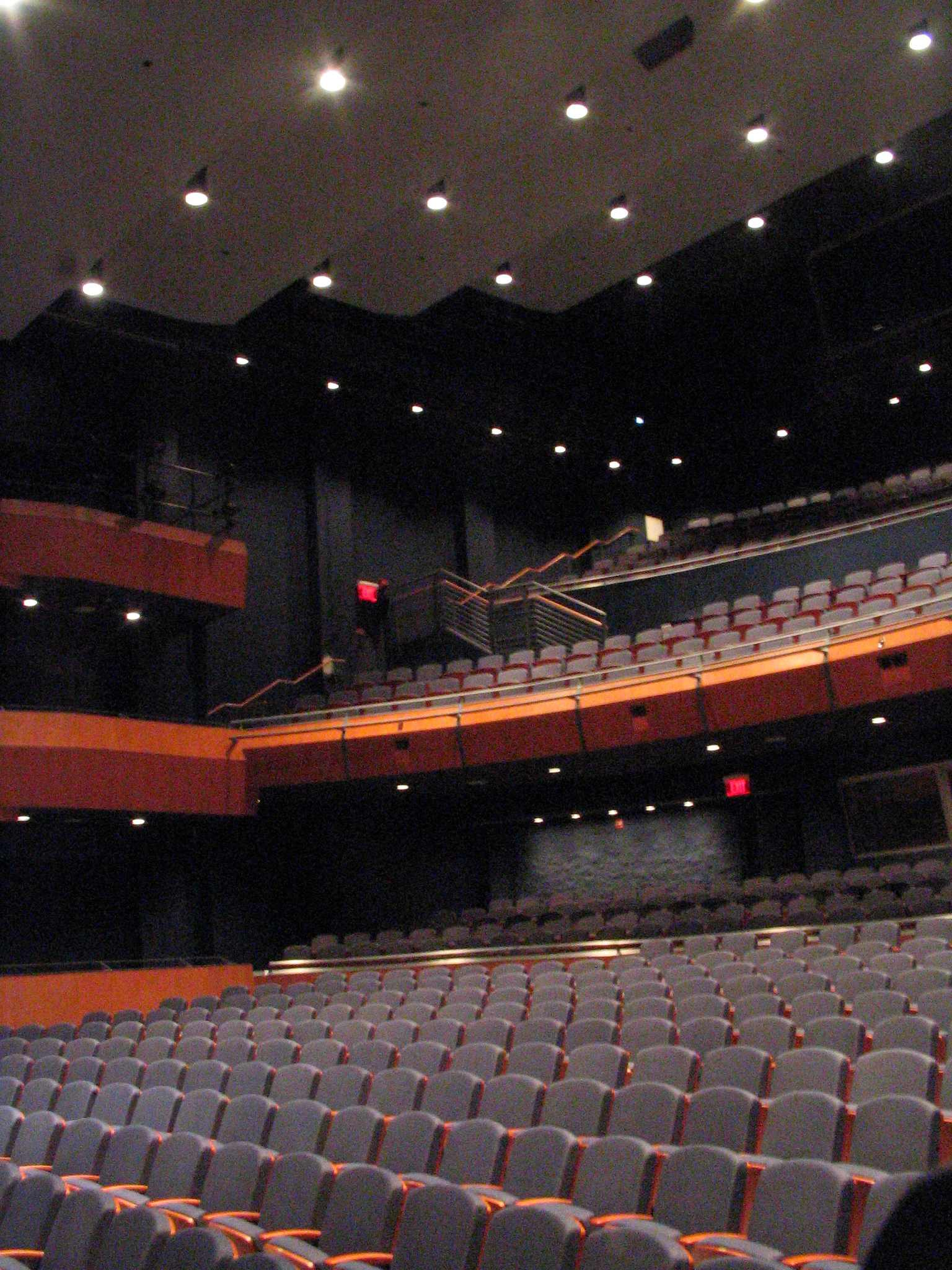
Donald C. Bedell Performance Hall

The River Campus is home to the Earl and Margie Holland School of Visual and Performing Arts. The facilities incorporate two buildings: the Seminary Building and the Cultural Arts Center. These buildings contain the Donald C. Bedell Performance Hall, the Rosemary Berkel and Harry L. Crisp II Museum, the John and Betty Glenn Convocation Center, the Wendy Kurka Rust Flexible Theatre, the Robert F. and Gertrude L. Shuck Music Recital Hall, and the River Campus Art Gallery. It is home to the departments of Art, Music, Theater and Dance. The River Campus hosts many performance series: the Theater and Dance Series, the Symphony Series, the Southeast Ensemble Series, the Jazz Series, the Faculty Recital Series and Sundays at Three chamber music Series. The Rosemary Berkel and Harry L. Crisp II Museum and Art Gallery features rotating touring exhibitions.

=== Regional campuses ===
Southeast and Three Rivers Community College in Poplar Bluff agreed in 2004 to share higher education facilities at three locations in southeast Missouri: Sikeston, Kennett, and Malden. In spring 2005, Southeast eliminated Three Rivers courses from those centers, citing failure of the community college to pay approximately $10,000 in facilities-use fees. Southeast took over all course offerings at the centers, which have subsequently been named regional campuses of Southeast Missouri State University. Three Rivers Community College filed a lawsuit in March 2005 against Southeast. The lawsuit was subsequently dropped, and Southeast and Three Rivers recently announced plans to develop a joint bachelor's degree program in social work. Southeast now operates four regional campuses, at Kennett, Malden, Sikeston, and Perryville.

== Athletics ==
Southeast Missouri State has been a member of NCAA Division I (Division I FCS for football) since moving up from Division II in 1991. As a result of the promotion in classifications, Southeast Missouri State left the Division II athletic conference Mid–America Intercollegiate Athletics Association (MIAA) and joined the Division I Ohio Valley Conference (OVC).

== Student life ==
Undergraduate demographics as of fall 2023
| Race and ethnicity | Total |
|---|---|
| White | 75% |
| Black | 8% |
| International student | 5% |
| Unknown | 4% |
| Hispanic | 3% |
| Two or more races | 3% |
| Asian | 1% |
Economic diversity
| Low-income (Note: The percentage of students who received an income-based federal Pell grant intended for low-income students.) | 36% |
| Affluent (Note: The percentage of students who are a part of the American middle class at the bare minimum.) | 64% |

=== Arrow student newspaper ===
The Arrow is the university's student newspaper. The second editor of the Capaha Arrow was Rush Limbaugh Sr., who became a nationally recognized Missouri attorney and practiced law in Cape Girardeau until just before his death at the age of 104 in 1996; he was the grandfather of the media personality Rush Limbaugh. After the university changed its mascot from Indians/Otahkians to Redhawks, the newspaper dropped Capaha and is now known as simply The Arrow. It is still run by students in the Department of Mass Media and publishes a biweekly newspaper distributed throughout campus. Microfilm and print copies of the Capaha Arrow dating back to the first issue are available at Kent Library and Special Collections and Archives, and some stories are also put on The Arrow website.

== Notable alumni ==
- 1941 Velmer A. Fassel, scientist
- 1955 Kenneth Dement, football player, lawyer, and local community leader
- 1960 Dick Hantak, football referee
- 1960 Ken Iman, football player
- 1961 Roy Thomas, comic book writer and editor
- 1968 Clyde A. Vaughn, director of the Army National Guard
- 1969 James T. Conway, United States Marine
- 1974 Linda Godwin, astronaut
- 1976 Peter Kinder, politician
- 1979 Steve Tappmeyer, basketball coach
- 1980 Desi Barmore (born 1960), basketball player
- 1987 Cedric Kyles, entertainer
- 1988 Jill Pizzotti, basketball coach
- 1990 Rodney Charles Wilson, educator, LGBTQ advocate
- 1994 Steven Tilley, speaker of the Missouri House of Representatives
- 1994 Kerry Robinson, former Major League outfielder for the St. Louis Cardinals
- 1998 Angel Rubio, football player
- 2000 Jason Witczak, football player
- 2001 Neal E. Boyd, 2008 winner of America's Got Talent
- 2003 Willie Ponder, football player
- 2004 Eugene Amano, football player
- 2005 Dan Connolly, football player
- 2006 Edgar Jones, football player
- 2007 Joe Tuineau, rugby player
- 2014 Tyler Stone (born 1991), basketball player in the Israeli Basketball Premier League
- 2016 Joey Lucchesi, baseball player
- 2017 Antonius Cleveland, basketball player
- 2018 Drew Forbes, football player
- 2021 Dylan Dodd, baseball player
