= St. Louis Community College =

Public college in St. Louis, Missouri, US

- Motto: "Expanding Minds. Changing Lives."
- Type: Public community college
- Established: 1962; 64 years ago
- Budget: $200.7 million (2017–18)
- Chancellor: Jeff Pittman
- Faculty: 397 (full-time)
- Administrative staff: 2,739
- Students: 69,000 (system-wide); 18,835 (fall 2017, credit)
- Location: Greater St. Louis, Missouri, U.S.
- Campus: Florissant Valley; Forest Park; Meramec; Wildwood
- Colors: Navy blue and silver
- Nickname: Archers
- Sporting affiliations: NJCAA – MCCAC
- Website: stlcc.edu

St. Louis Community College (STLCC) is a public community college with four main campuses in the St. Louis metropolitan area in Missouri, United States. It primarily offers associate degrees and certificates and operates four main campuses (Florissant Valley, Forest Park, Meramec, and Wildwood), along with several other education centers in the region.

== History ==
In 1966, STLCC built three campuses: Florissant Valley Community College in Ferguson, Forest Park Community College in St. Louis, and Meramec Community College in Kirkwood.

Over the objections of the faculty and student body, in 1976 STLCC administration changed the names of the individual campuses to the format St. Louis Community College–Campus Name.

In August 2007, STLCC opened a fourth campus, St. Louis Community College–Wildwood in Wildwood. In addition, there are four satellite facilities throughout the area.

In 2011, Myrtle Dorsey was appointed as college chancellor.

=== Dissatisfaction with Chancellor Pittman ===
Jeff Pittman became chancellor of STLCC in July 2015. Pittman reportedly received approximately $40,000 for housing and car allowance in 2016. The Chancellor's level of compensation was characterized as 70 percent above the national average by some faculty concerned with the management of the college. Student protests occurred under Pittman.

On November 28, 2017, the college's chapter of the NEA called for a vote of no confidence in Chancellor Pittman and the board of trustees. Included in the NEA's call for a vote of no confidence was the statement by its President Robert Hertel, that the union was responding to "the levels of waste and mismanagement taking place at the college for YEARS". In January 2018, the Executive Council of the college's chapter of the National Education Association had a unanimous vote of "No Confidence" in Chancellor Pittman.

== Academics ==
The college grants associate degrees (A.A., A.S., A.A.S., A.F.A.), as well as Certificates of Proficiency (for completing a specified one-year course of study) and Certificates of Specialization (for completing a specified six-month course of study). A bachelor's degree (B.S.) in Respiratory Care is also offered.

== Athletics ==
STLCC operates as a single entity in athletic competition (as opposed to each campus operating as a separate program, which was the case prior to consolidation). Athletic teams are open to any eligible STLCC student, regardless of which campus the student attends.

The teams are known as the Archers (named for, and the athletic teams' logo incorporates, the Gateway Arch) and participate in the Missouri Community College Athletic Conference (MCCAC).

- The Florissant Valley Campus hosts Men's Soccer.
- The Forest Park Campus hosts Men's and Women's Basketball.
- The Meramec Campus hosts Men's Baseball, Women's Soccer, Women's Softball, and Women's Volleyball.

The Wildwood Campus does not host any STLCC athletic programs.

== Notable alumni ==
- David Freese, MLB player and 2011 World Series MVP with the St. Louis Cardinals
- Dana Loesch, conservative political commentator
- T.J. Mathews, professional baseball player
- Mike Miano, professional football player
- Josh Outman, professional baseball player
- Steve Pecher, professional soccer player
- Joe Right, professional soccer player
- Ronnie L. White, United States District Judge
- Deron Winn, professional mixed martial artist
