= Missouri's 26th Senate district =

American legislative district

Missouri's 26th State Senate district
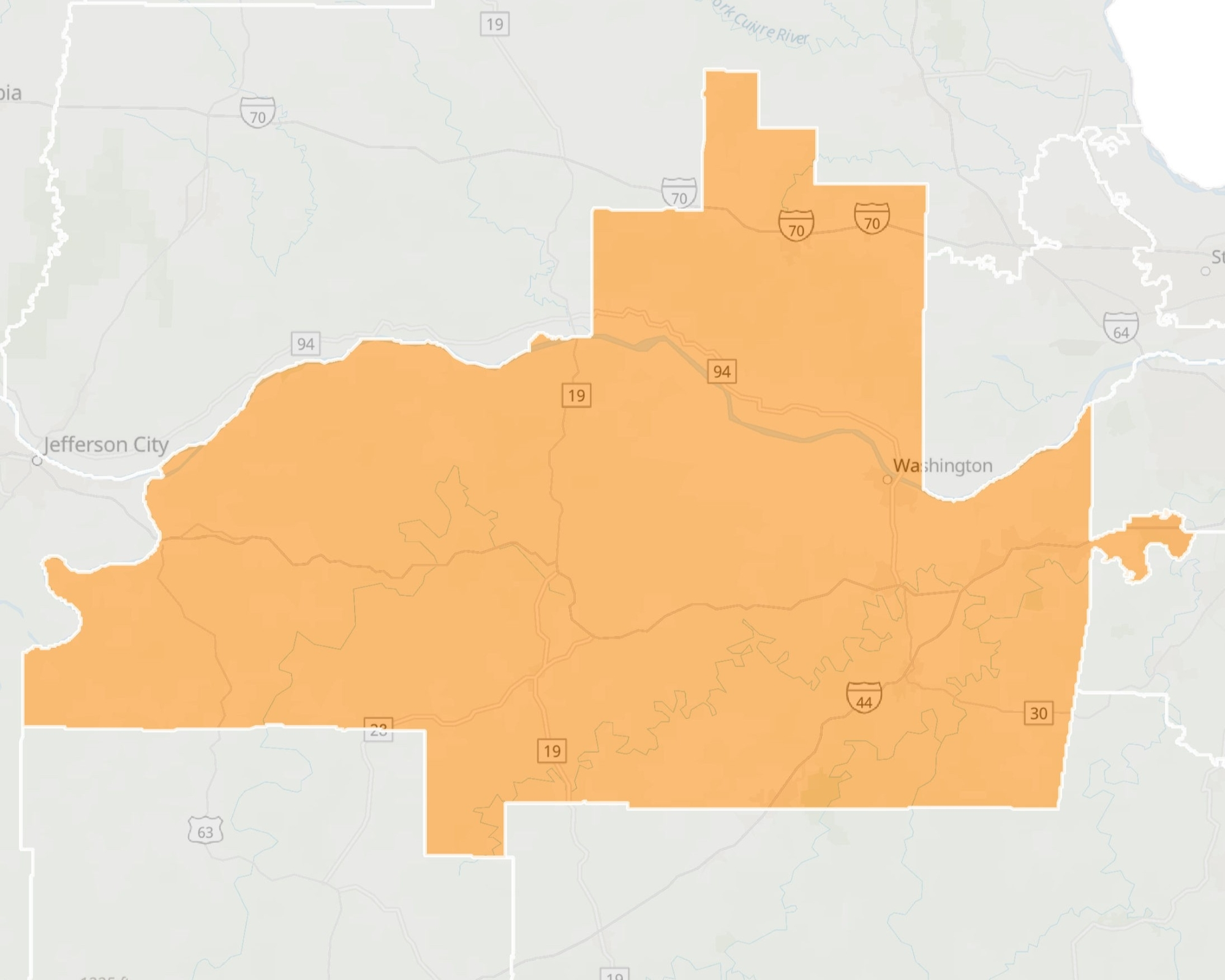
Senator
| Ben Brown; R–Washington |
- Demographics: 90% White; 1% Black; 2% Hispanic; 1% Asian; 6% Multiracial
- Population (2023): 183,430

Missouri's 26th Senatorial District is one of 34 districts in the Missouri Senate. The district has been represented by Republican Ben Brown since 2023.

== Geography ==
The district is based to the west of the St. Louis metropolitan area and includes Franklin, Gasconade, Osage, and Warren counties, and a small portion of western St. Louis County. Major municipalities in the district include Pacific, Union, Warrenton, and Washington. The district is also home to Meramec Caverns in Meramec State Park.

== 2026 candidates ==
=== Republican primary ===
- Benjamin Brown, incumbent senator

=== Democratic primary ===
- Victoria Taylor Wors, retired human resources manager

== Election results (1998–2022) ==
=== 1998 ===
Missouri's 26th Senatorial District election (1998)
| Party | Candidate | Votes | % |
|---|---|---|---|
| Republican | David Klarich | 32,739 | 64.8 |
| Democratic | Donald D. Meyer | 17,766 | 35.2 |
| Total votes | | 50,505 | 100.0 |

=== 2002 ===
Missouri's 26th Senatorial District election (2002)
| Party | Candidate | Votes | % |
|---|---|---|---|
| Republican | John Griesheimer | 42,057 | 70.1 |
| Democratic | Donald D. Meyer | 17,952 | 29.9 |
| Total votes | | 60,009 | 100.0 |
| Republican hold | | | |

=== 2006 ===
Missouri's 26th Senatorial District election (2006)
| Party | Candidate | Votes | % |
|---|---|---|---|
| Republican | John Griesheimer (incumbent) | 44,346 | 63.4 |
| Democratic | Gene Tyler | 25,556 | 36.6 |
| Total votes | | 69,902 | 100.0 |
| Republican hold | | | |

=== 2010 ===
Missouri's 26th Senatorial District election (2010)
| Party | Candidate | Votes | % |
|---|---|---|---|
| Republican | Brian Nieves | 42,112 | 65.6 |
| Democratic | George Weber | 19,063 | 29.7 |
| Constitution | Richard E. Newton | 2,988 | 4.7 |
| Total votes | | 64,163 | 100.0 |
| Republican hold | | | |

=== 2014 ===
Missouri's 26th Senatorial District election (2014)
| Party | Candidate | Votes | % |
|---|---|---|---|
| Republican | Dave Schatz | 37,219 | 72.9 |
| Democratic | Lloyd Klinedinst | 13,808 | 27.1 |
| Total votes | | 51,027 | 100.0 |
| Republican hold | | | |

=== 2018 ===
Missouri's 26th Senatorial District election (2018)
| Party | Candidate | Votes | % |
|---|---|---|---|
| Republican | Dave Schatz (incumbent) | 53,507 | 63.9 |
| Democratic | John Kiehne | 30,237 | 36.1 |
| Total votes | | 83,744 | 100.0 |
| Republican hold | | | |

=== 2022 ===
Missouri's 26th Senatorial District election (2022)
| Party | Candidate | Votes | % |
|---|---|---|---|
| Republican | Ben Brown | 48,469 | 73.9 |
| Democratic | John Kiehne | 17,115 | 26.1 |
| Total votes | | 65,584 | 100.0 |
| Republican hold | | | |

== Statewide election results ==
| Year | Office | Results |
|---|---|---|
| 2008 | President | McCain 57.5 – 40.7% |
| 2012 | President | Romney 66.1 – 33.9% |
| 2016 | President | Trump 71.7 – 23.8% |
| 2016 | Senate | Blunt 58.2 – 36.8% |
| 2016 | Governor | Greitens 57.9 – 36.8% |
| 2018 | Senate | Hawley 62.0 – 34.4% |
| 2020 | President | Trump 72.3 – 25.9% |
| 2020 | Governor | Parson 71.4 – 26.3% |
