= Pacific (disambiguation) =

The Pacific Ocean is the largest ocean in the world.

Pacific may also refer to:

== Places ==
=== Related to the Pacific Ocean ===
- Pacific-Antarctic Ridge, oceanic ridge at the boundary between the Pacific and Antarctic tectonic plates
- Pacific-Farallon Ridge, former oceanic ridge at the boundary between the Pacific and Farallon tectonic plates
- Pacific-Kula Ridge, former oceanic ridge at the boundary between the Pacific and Kula tectonic plates
- Pacific Rim, political and economic term used to designate the countries on the edges of the Pacific Ocean as well as the various island nations within the region

=== Places ===
- Pacific, California, community in El Dorado County
- Pacific, Missouri, place in the United States
- Pacific, Washington, city in King County, Washington
- Pacific, Wisconsin
- Pacific County, Washington
- Pacific Highway (disambiguation), any one of several highways around the world
- Pacific Time Zone

== Military history ==
- Asiatic-Pacific Theater (a.k.a. Pacific Theater of Operations), the term used in the United States for all military activity in the Pacific Ocean and the countries bordering it during World War II
- Pacific Ocean Areas (command), the major Allied military command in the Pacific Ocean theatre of World War II
- Pacific Ocean theater of World War II, one of four major theaters of the Pacific War, between 1941 and 1945
- Pacific War, the part of World War II — and preceding conflicts — that took place in the Pacific Ocean, its islands, and in East Asia, from 1937 to 1945
- War of the Pacific, fought between Chile and the joint forces of Bolivia and Peru, from 1879 to 1884

== Art, entertainment, and media ==
=== Music ===
- Pacific Ocean (band), a late 60s American West-Coast psychedelic band
- Pacific Jazz Records, a Los Angeles-based record company and label
- Pacific (1978 album), an album by Haruomi Hosono, Shigeru Suzuki and Tatsuro Yamashita
- Pacific (NEWS album), a 2007 album by NEWS
- The Pacific EP, 2014 EP by Holy Holy
- "Pacific State" (song) also known as "Pacific" a 1989 single by 808 State

=== Other ===
- Pacific Theatres, a movie theater chain in southern California
- The Pacific (miniseries), an HBO TV miniseries about the US involvement in the Pacific during World War II
- Pacific (book), a non-fiction book by Simon Winchester
- Pacific (painting), a painting by Alex Colville

== Broadcasting ==
- Pacific Broadcasting System, an affiliate of MBC Media Group in the Philippines
- Pacific TV, an Indonesian television station
- RNZ Pacific, a New Zealand radio station

== Companies ==
- A&P (The Great Atlantic & Pacific Tea Company), a former American and Canadian supermarket chain
- COSCO Pacific, a Chinese port operator
- Georgia-Pacific, an American pulp and paper company
- Pacific Basin Shipping Limited, a Hong Kong shipping company
- Pacific Investment Management, an investment company
- Pacific Trucks, a Canadian heavy truck maker
- Pacific Television Corporation, a defunct Japanese entertainment company

== Schools ==
- Pacific High School (disambiguation), the name of several American high schools
- Pacific University, a private college in Oregon
- Universidad del Pacífico (disambiguation), usually translated as "University of the Pacific", any of a number of distinct Latin American universities
- University of the Pacific (United States), a private university in California
- University of the South Pacific

== Sports ==
- Pacific FC, a Canadian soccer team
- Pacific F.C. (Mexico), a former Mexican football team
- Pacific Grand Prix, former Formula 1 race in Japan
- Pacific Racing, an extinct Formula 1 team
- Pacific Tigers, the intercollegiate sports program of the University of the Pacific in California

== Transportation ==
=== Airlines ===
- Air Pacific (airline) (now called Fiji Airways), a Fijian airline
- Cebu Pacific, a low-cost airline in the Philippines
- Cathay Pacific, a Hong Kong airline
- Pacific Airlines, an airline based in Vietnam
- Pacific Air Lines, a defunct airline

=== Railroads and trains ===
- Pacific, a name often given to steam locomotives of the 4-6-2 wheel arrangement
- Southern Pacific Railroad, a former Class 1 railroad network in the United States
- Union Pacific Railroad, a railroad network in the United States
- Canadian Pacific Railway, a former railroad network in Canada

=== Ships ===
- MS Pacific, a cruise ship formerly called MS Pacific Princess
- Pacific-class patrol boat, a class of 22 patrol boats built by Australia and donated to twelve South Pacific countries
- SS Pacific (1849), a Collins Line transatlantic sidewheel steamship that sank off the coast of Wales in 1856
- SS Pacific (1850), an ocean liner that sank off the coast of Washington State in 1875
- SS Pacific (1914), later renamed Hewitt, a cargo steamship that went missing off the United States Atlantic coast in 1921

== People ==
- Saint Pacific (Pacificus of San Severino), Roman catholic saint (1653 – 1721)

== See also ==
- The Pacific Ocean (band), U.S. rock band
- Pacifique (disambiguation)
- Pacific City (disambiguation)
