= Pacific City (disambiguation) =

Pacific City may refer to:

- Pacific City, Oregon, USA; an unincorporated community
  - Pacific City State Airport
- Pacific City, Washington, USA; a ghost town
- Pacific City Amusement Park, which was open briefly (1922–24) in what is now Coyote Point Recreation Area, a county park in San Mateo County, California
- Pacific City, a never-built land development, initiated by Henry Halloran, near Hyams Beach, New South Wales , Australia

== See also ==
- Huntington Beach, California, USA; formerly known as Pacific City
- Pacific, Washington, USA; a city in King and Pierce counties
- Pacific, Missouri, USA; a city in Franklin county
- Pacific City Bank, a community bank in California
- Pacific City Lines, a U.S. streetcar company designed to phase out trolleys for motorbuses
- Core Pacific City, a shopping mall in Taipei, Taiwan
- City Pacific, an Australian financial services company
- City Pacific Finance Stakes, an Australian horse race
- Pacific (disambiguation)
