= Universidad del Pacífico =

Universidad del Pacífico may refer to:

- Universidad del Pacifico (Chile)
- Universidad del Pacifico (Colombia)
- Universidad del Pacífico (Peru)

== See also ==
- University of the Pacific (disambiguation)
