= George Hinkle =

American football player (born 1965)

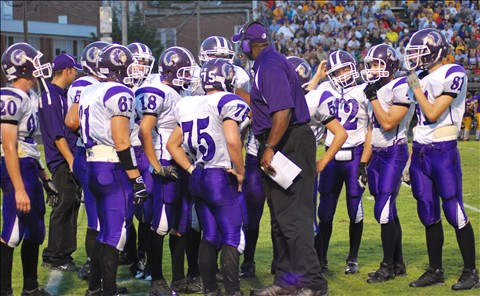
- Hinkle coaching Pacific High School

No. 97, 98
- Position: Defensive lineman

Personal information
- Born: March 17, 1965 (age 61); Pacific, Missouri, U.S.
- Listed height: 6 ft 4 in (1.93 m)
- Listed weight: 273 lb (124 kg)

Career information
- High school: Pacific
- College: Arizona
- NFL draft: 1988: 11th round, 293rd overall pick

Career history
- San Diego Chargers (1988–1991); Washington Redskins (1992)*; Minnesota Vikings (1992); Cincinnati Bengals (1993)
- * Offseason or practice squad member only

Career NFL statistics
- Sacks: 7.5
- Fumble recoveries: 1
- Stats at Pro Football Reference

George Allen Hinkle Jr. (born March 17, 1965) is an American former professional football player and coach. He played defensive end for six seasons for the San Diego Chargers, Minnesota Vikings, and Cincinnati Bengals. He was selected by the Chargers in the 11th round of the 1988 NFL draft.

Hinkle was the head coach of his alma mater, Pacific High School. Hinkle took over the program on a 49-game losing streak before leading them to a 2–8 record in his first year, and a 3–7 record in his second year. The third-year Coach Hinkle led the Indians to an 8–3 record, the first winning season in over 10 years and first Four Rivers Conference title and District title in 15 years. Coach Hinkle's District Championship team was led by his son, George Hinkle III, and Blake Arnette, a Lindenwood University signee. He resigned in 2013. In 2024, Hinkle was inducted into the Pacific High School Hall of Fame.

| Head coach | Year | Record | Awards |
|---|---|---|---|
| Pacific | 2007 | 2–8 | FRC Coach of the Year |
| Pacific | 2008 | 3–7 | |
| Pacific | 2009 | 8–3 | FRC Coach of the Year, FRC Championship, District Championship |
| Total | 3 years | 13–18 (.419) | |
