= PCB Bank =

Korean American bank

PCB Bancorp
- Company type: Public
- Traded as: Nasdaq: PCB
- Industry: Banking
- Founded: 2003; 23 years ago
- Headquarters: Los Angeles, California
- Key people: Henry Kim (president and CEO)
- Revenue: $67.2 million (2017)

Korean name
- Hangul: 태평양 은행
- Hanja: 太平洋銀行
- Revised Romanization: Taepyeong-yang Eunhaeng
- McCune–Reischauer: T'aepyŏng'yang Ŭnhaeng
- Website: www.mypcbbank.com

PCB Bank (previously known as Pacific City Bank) is an American community bank that focuses on the Korean-American community based in California and offers commercial banking services. It has branches in 8 states and is the third largest Korean American Bank after Bank of Hope and Hanmi Bank.

== History ==
The bank was founded as a state-chartered bank on September 18, 2003, in Los Angeles, California. On July 9, 2007, Pacific City Financial Corporation was established and became a bank holding company with Pacific City Bank become a wholly owned subsidiary. Daniel Cho was appointed to Pacific City Bank’s board of directors on April 1, 2017. Henry Kim was appointed to succeed Haeyoung Cho, a founding member of the bank, as president and chief executive officer of the company and the bank upon her retirement at the end of 2017.

== Overview ==
As of 2017, PCB Bank operated 16 branch offices and 7 loan production offices in Lynwood and Bellevue, Washington; Denver, Colorado, Chicago, Illinois; Annandale, Virginia; Atlanta, Georgia; Orange County, California; and Bayside, New York for small to medium-size businesses and offers real estate loans, small business loans and lines of credit, trade finance loans, auto loans, residential mortgage loans, and SBA loans.
