= List of Shigurui episodes =

Shigurui (シグルイ; lit. "Death Frenzy") is a manga series by Takayuki Yamaguchi, based on the first chapter of the novel Suruga-jō Gozen Jiai by Norio Nanjō. An animated television adaptation, based on the first 32 chapters (or the initial six and a half volumes) of the manga.

It aired on WOWOW from July 19 to October 12, 2007. The series was directed by Hiroshi Hamasaki, written by Seishi Minakami, and produced by Madhouse Studios. The series is noted for its realistic graphic violence and nudity as well as its abrupt ending. The anime was licensed in North America by Funimation Entertainment under the fully translated title Shigurui: Death Frenzy. The licensing was announced in May 2008, and the full series was released on March 31, 2009, on Blu-ray and DVD.

== Episode list ==
No.	Title	Original release date
1	"Sword Match at Sunpu Castle"; Transliteration: "Sunpujō gozen jiai" (Japanese: 駿府城御前試合)	July 19, 2007
In 1629, the daimyō Tokugawa Tadanaga, decides to stage a samurai tournament where the participants fight with real steel swords rather than wooden swords against the strong objection of his advisor. To everyone's surprise the first challenge is between one-armed Gennosuke Fujiki and the crippled and blind Seigen Irako. In a flashback to 1622, seven years earlier, Irako is seen approaching the Iwamata dojo in Kagegawa, famous for the Kogan style, to challenge the master. However before he faces the master he must first defeat two apprentices. His first match is with Gennosuke Fujiki whose fingers he damages in the encounter.
2	"The Yodare-Azuki Ceremony"; Transliteration: "Yodare azuki" (Japanese: 涎小豆)	July 26, 2007
In 1601, Iwamata Kogan tests his sword by beheading six criminals in one stroke. Back in 1622, while Gennosuke Fujiki nurses his damaged fingers, Irako must next face a superior foe to earn the right to meet the sensei. His next opponent is Ushimata who wields a large wooden sword. Irako is outclassed, and asks to join the dojo, but Ushimata is angered and wounds him anyway. While Irako contemplates marrying Kogan's daughter Mie, he is summoned to meet Iwamata Kogan. In a flashback, Kogan faces Yagyu Munenori in a match at the Yagyu Estate, and after saving him from yielding embarrassingly, declared the match a draw. However he recalls how Munenori later duped him into embarrassing himself while being interviewed as a sword instructor at the House of Tokugawa. Back in the present, Irako is then taken to meet the Kogan, where he is bound and a yodare azuki (涎小豆, red bean) is placed on his forehead. A demented and incontinent Iwamata Kogan then enters and although appearing to have no control of his body, slices the bean without touching Irako's skin, accepting him into the dojo.
3	"Kamaitachi"; Transliteration: "Kamaitachi" (Japanese: 鎌鼬)	August 2, 2007
A year passes and Irako has seduced Kogan's daughter Mie, mastered Ushimata's technique and become a potential successor to Kogan. During periods of lucidity, Kogan give instructions at the dojo. Kogan devises a challenge to clarify which of Irako and Fujiki are the most likely candidates to be his successor, to bring the heads of twin sons of the master Funaki Ichidensai, the two best swordsmen in Nissaka. They confront the twins at night in the woods, initially claiming to be Kamaitachi rather than samurai. The two Kogan win the contest, and return with the faces of the Funaki twins, pausing as Irako vomits by the roadside.
4	"Children's Song"; Transliteration: "Warabeuta" (Japanese: 童歌)	August 9, 2007
Children mock Lady Iku in a song suggesting that she is cursed after two of her fiancés died. Meanwhile, the Kogan disciples give credit to Fujiki for their success over the Funaki as he struck the older twin first giving an opening to Irako. Lady Iku encounters Irako in the bath house who tells her that he believes her husband Kogan was responsible for her fiancé's death and that she is not cursed. Later he is warned by Ushimata not to visit her again. Kogan selects Irako as his heir, and orders Mie let him mate with her in the presence of the other disciples. Fujiki, despite his feeling for Mie, is one of the men who restrains her when she refuses. Only through Irako's pleading is the copulation postponed until after the wedding. On a cold winter night, Fujiki is approached by Funaki swordsman seeking revenge, but even though his fingers are numb with cold, Fujiki defeats him using the Nagare Boshi (Shooting Star) strike.
5	"Secret Swordplay Technique Instruction"; Transliteration: "Hiken denju" (Japanese: 秘剣伝授)	August 23, 2007
The Kogan instructors discuss Irako's past in a merchant family and Fujiki temporarily disappears from the dojo after Irako is made heir. At one of his secret meetings with Lady Iku at the Totomi Inn, Irako says he can no longer see her. In a flashback, Irako's mother is seen prostituting herself, even while pregnant. When she finally gives birth, she is six months overdue. Irako arrives crawling from the day he was born and prone to violence at a young age. Meanwhile Master Kogan becomes suspicious of his mistress Iku's conduct and slices off a nipple as punishment. Later, Irako is summoned to the Kontake Shrine on Akiba Mountain, the place where Master Kogan first awoke to the Nagare Boshi technique, and is promised instruction in the Shooting Star Technique.
6	"Birth Cry"; Transliteration: "Ubugoe" (Japanese: 産声)	August 30, 2007
Ushimata tells Lady Iku, now imprisoned at the Kogan dojo, that Irako will be punished. At the Kontake Shrine, Irako is told that before he is shown the Nagare Boshi technique, he must first fight Ushimata with wooden blades. However, the bout is rigged, and Irako suffers two punishing blows from Ushimata after Irako withholds his winning move. He is then asked to fight Fujiki, and although they are evenly matched, Fujiki downs Irako. With his back turned, Irako attacks Fujiki from behind, imagining inheriting the Kogan dojo, marrying Mie and Fujiki having to pay his respects. However, Fujiki retaliates and almost beats Irako to death with his hands. While still suffering from his injuries, Lady Iku is forced to mutilate Irako with a hot iron, but burns her breast instead. Finally Irako faces Sensai Kogan who blinds him, ending Irako's dreams of the Kogan inheritance, and he makes Fujiki his successor.
7	"Fangs"; Transliteration: "Kiba" (Japanese: 牙)	September 6, 2007
A scene is shown depicting Tokugawa Tadanaga's inhumanity and cruelty. In the years since Irako was sent away, packs of ronin samurai have begun wandering the country. A new Kogan student, Kondo Suzunosuke, slays one of the ronin after overhearing them disrespect the Kogan dojo. Pleased with the young pupil's instincts, Kogan sends Fujiki to teach the novice a true lesson in the art of the kill. Fujiki takes a group of Kogan to meet the Ronin, and Fujiki challenges the first swordsman bare-handed, planning to use his techniques after achieving Dai-Mokuroku. He defeats the first ronin, and the Kogan samurai kill the others, leaving one to spread word of the encounter. Returning later to his room Fujiki finds Suzunosuke's head on the rafters.
8	"Chorus of Cicadas"; Transliteration: "Semi shigure" (Japanese: 蝉しぐれ)	September 13, 2007
The Kogan instructors find Suzunosuke's body but no leads to his killer who has used a strong upward stroke to kill. They decide to select and kill the strong swordsman Hikagi Jingorou to be the scapegoat for Suzunosuke's death. Battle-scarred Munakata Shinpachirou volunteers to carry out the plan and kills Hikagi Jingorou. However, on his return he encounters a misshapen man with a sword on a bridge and realizes that he is Suzunosuke's killer. Later Munakata's head is left on the bridge with an imitation sword as a challenge. Instructor Yamazaki Kurouemon goes to avenge his death, and kills two ronin at an inn criticizing the Kogan school. However Yamazaki also encounters the mysterious swordsman and his head is also left on the bridge.
9	"Tiger Cubs"; Transliteration: "Koshi" (Japanese: 虎子)	September 20, 2007
In 1627, two and a half years since Irako was punished and banned, Mie's despair over her cruel treatment by her father eats away at her mind. She runs off with her father's sword and he orders her slain, however Fujiki confronts and disarms her even though she uses the Nagare Boshi technique. Fujiki tells Ushimata he believes the killer is Irako even though he is blind, and suspects that he is hiding in Kagegawa. Instructors Mariko Hikobee and Okitsu Sanjyuurou visit Tsudanoichu, a blind masseuse and acupuncturist asking about any new blind strangers. He suggests they speak to a man called Shizuhata Kengyou, the head of the Toudouza, however because of his high station and closeness to Tadagawa, that would be impossible for them. Later, Mariko visits a bathhouse, but as he prepares to sit in the bath he is sliced in half. Later, Okitsu is seen receiving payment from Kengyou's secretaries for information about the three tiger cubs, the three strongest Kogan-ryuu disciples. In the woods, he encounters Fujiki on the way and challenges Fujiki who is vulnerable due to an infected hand. After insulting Mie, Okitsu attempts to use the Nagare Boshi technique, but Fujiki is faster, severing Okitsu's right hand and then killing him.
10	"Kengyou's House of Punishment"; Transliteration: "Kengyō shioki yashiki" (Japanese: 検校仕置屋敷)	September 27, 2007
Mie begins eating again and recovering her strength. The murder of the Kogan apprentices was attributed to Okitsu which shocked everyone in Kagegawa, but conveniently closed the case. Meanwhile Kogan violently accuses Ushimata and Fujiki of selling out the Kogan style for money like Okitsu before lapsing into a state of dementia for 49 days. After Kogan recovers, a letter is delivered summoning the Kogan clan to the palace of the blind Kengyou Shizuhata. Kogan is shown a Spanish rapier wielded by the warrior, Sekiun, who uses it in place of a katana. He is asked if it is a wazamono and Kogan replies is it is suitable for display only. Kengyou then asks Kogan to provide Fujiki for a demonstration bout against Sekiun who will use the rapier, while Fujiki will use a wooden sword. As the bout is ready to commence, Kogan steps forward in Fujiki's place. Seemingly unprepared, Kogan appears to be pierced through his chest by the rapier, but manages to harmlessly trap it in his armpit. Thereupon, he spots Irako and Lady Iku observing the bout. Now understanding the technique, Kogan blocks the rapier thrust with his wooden sword and beats Sekiun bloody with his bare hands. Defeated, Sekiun attacks Kengyou, but Sekiun is killed by the bodyguard. Later, Irako taunts Fujiki and threatens that he will be the next to suffer.
11	"Moonlight"; Transliteration: "Gekkō" (Japanese: 月光)	October 4, 2007
Ushimata and Fujiki realize that Irako is using Kengyou to destroy the Kogan dojo and that the swordplay demonstration was intended to kill Fujiki. On their return to the dojo, Kogan explodes in a violent rage before collapsing as three Kogan style swordsmen arrive from Noubi dojo; Ibuki Hanshinken, Neoya Rokurobee and Kanayoka Unryusai. They explain that Ushimata asked them to protect the Sensei, but Fujiki first challenges them to a test to evaluate their skills. Fujiki receives a challenge from Irako and he goes to meet Irako at the Shrine on Akiba Mountain leaving Kogan in the care of the three swordsmen from Noubi dojo. Meanwhile Ushimata is ambushed in the forest by Kengyou swordsmen. Ushimata manages to kill them, but is cut by a poisoned metal claw. In a flashback, Irako is shown discovering his blind sword technique after he and Iku were attacked by three bandits. Meanwhile instead of meeting Irako, Fujiki encounters a Kengyou man with a gun. He fires at Fujiki, but Fujiki blocks the bullet using the base of his sword and kills him. While the two strongest Kogan swordsmen are away, Irako and Iku appear at the Kogan dojo.
12	"Mumyo Sakanagare"; Transliteration: "Mumyō Sakanagare" (Japanese: 無明逆流れ)	October 11, 2007
Irako and Iku are greeted by the three swordsmen from Noubi dojo and are allowed to enter Kogan dojo, not being perceived as a great threat. Iku plays the biwa while Irako performs a short poem. Next, Iku strips to present a tattoo of a dragon killing a tiger on her back to provoke Kogan, but Kogan suddenly cuts the skin from her back and when two Noubi jump to protect him, he kills them. Fearing being trapped in the room of bloodied corpses, Irako leaps outside and prepares to face Kogan alone. They attack each other, and although Irako is cut he is sure he made a fatal strike on Kogan. Irako waits to hear Kogan fall, but hearing only other sounds, manages to rise and stab the old man with his sword. Only then is it apparent that he struck a fatal blow with half of Kogan's face gone. Fujiki returns to find the scene of carnage and vainly tries to revive his dead master. Seven days later Ushimata returns to find the dojo closed and in mourning. Some time later Irako appears before Tadanaga and when asked what style he uses, he replies, Mumyou Sakanagare.
