= City Pacific =

Australian finance company

City Pacific Limited
- Company type: Public
- Traded as: ASX: CIY
- Industry: financial services
- Founded: Qld, Australia (1997)
- Founder: Phil Sullivan
- Key people: Philip Graeme Downie (Chairman)
- Website: citypac.com.au

City Pacific is an Australian company established in 1997 by Phil Sullivan as a financial investment manager. It is the holder of Australian Financial Services Licence, and was listed on the ASX in July 2001.

== History ==
On 14 January 2008, City Pacific launched a $1.4 billion scrip bid for Gold Coast operator MFS Limited (now Octaviar), however the bid failed.

Redemptions and distributions have been frozen since early 2008, and the First Mortgage Fund has been declared illiquid by CP.

The chairman of the board of directors is Phillip Graeme Downie (FCA).

== Recent events ==
On 3 August 2009, receivers and managers were appointed to the company following a court decision that awarded control of a mortgage fund, the companies principal source of income as its manager, to rival Balmain Trilogy.

This followed City Pacific freezing redemptions on the fund and unitholders voicing their anger at the companies management fees for controlling the fund. In October 2008, Phil Sullivan, a former bankrupt, left the fund partly as a result of death threats made against him.

On 16 June 2018, Mr Sullivan (allegedly) entered into another Bankruptcy agreement with his administrators.

== Business units ==
- Funds Management
  - City Pacific First Mortgage Fund
  - City Pacific Income Fund
  - City Pacific Managed Fund
  - City Pacific Private Fund
  - City Pacific Treasury Finance
- Property
  - CP1 Limited ASX: CPK
  - Indigo Pacific Capital Ltd ASX: IPA
  - Grande Pacific
  - City Pacific Project Management
- Financial Services
  - City Pacific Finance
  - CityPac Home Loans
  - City Pacific Marina Finance
  - Australian Beneficial Finance

== See also ==
- City Pacific Finance Stakes
