= 3rd Iowa Independent Battery Light Artillery =

3rd Iowa Light Artillery Battery
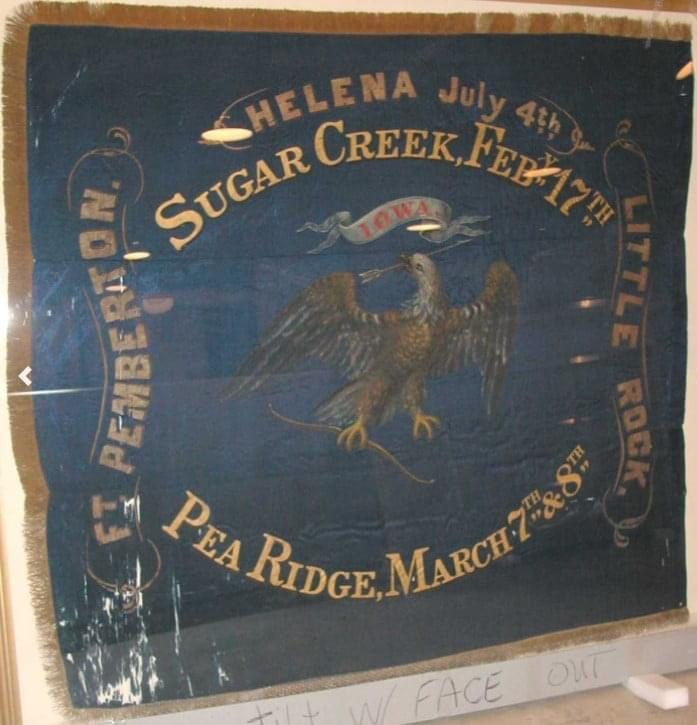
- 3rd Iowa Light Artillery Battery flag
- Active: September 24, 1861 – October 23, 1865
- Disbanded: October 23, 1865
- Country: United States
- Allegiance: Union
- Branch: Artillery
- Type: Artillery
- Size: Battery (290)
- Part of: Army of the Southwest
- Nickname: Dubuque Battery
- Engagements: American Civil War; Battle of Pea Ridge; Yazoo Pass expedition; Battle of Helena; Little Rock campaign
- Battle honours: Sugar Creek; Pea Ridge; Fort Pemberton; Helena; Little Rock

Commanders
- Captain: Mortimer M. Hayden; Melvil C. Wright; Orlo H. Lyon
- Lieutenant: W.H. McClure; H.H. Weaver; O.G. Day; J.J. Dengl; W.H. Gilford; W.H. Crozier; Jervine Bradley; Leroy S. House; Charles S. Martin; D.U. Lee; R. McFate

The 3rd Iowa Light Artillery Battery was a light artillery battery from Iowa that served in the Union Army between September 24, 1861, and October 23, 1865, during the American Civil War.

== Service ==
The 3rd Iowa Light Artillery was mustered into Federal service at Dubuque, Iowa, for a three-year enlistment on September 24, 1861, with an initial strength of 140 men under the command of Captain Mortimer M. Hayden.

In late September, the battery moved to St. Louis, Missouri, where it underwent initial training at Benton Barracks. Due to equipment shortages, the battery didn't receive full armament until December 1861, while stationed at Pacific City, Missouri.

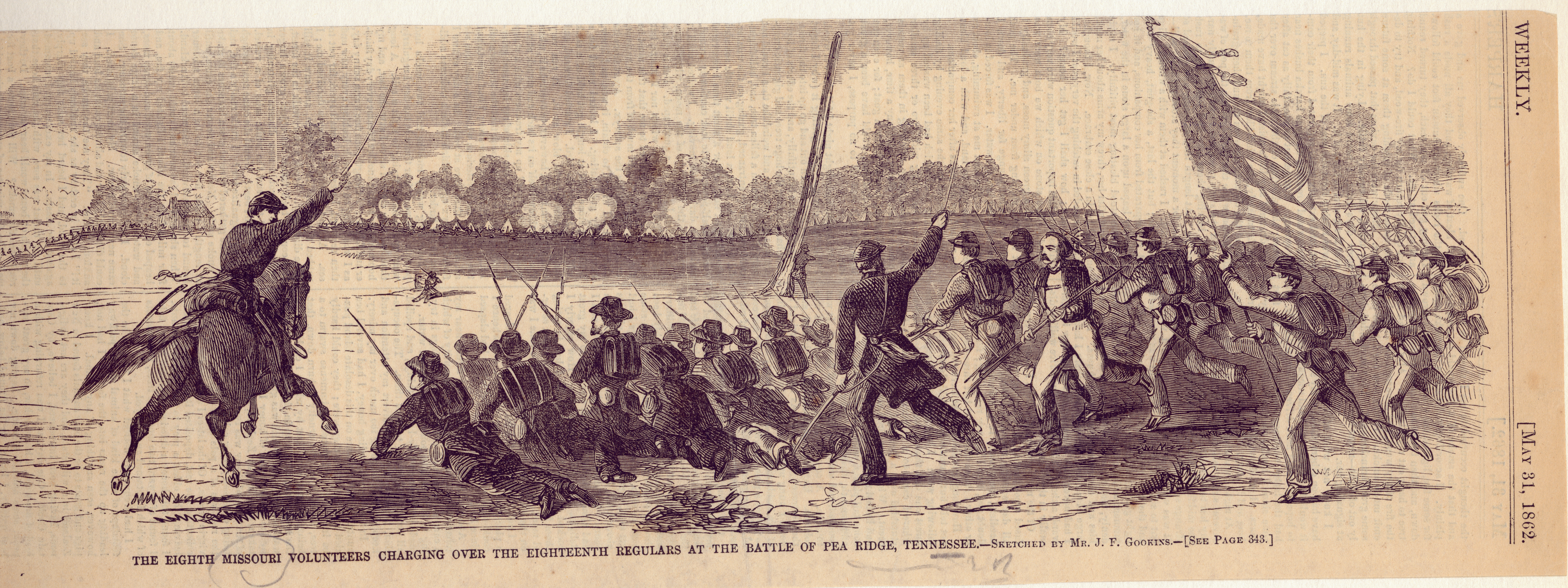
Harper's Weekly sketch of the battle by J.F. Gookins

=== Battle of Pea Ridge ===
In January 1862, the battery joined Major General Samuel R. Curtis's Army of the Southwest for a campaign in Arkansas. On February 17, at Sugar Creek, The Battery was engaged against a Confederate Battery, silencing it in 30 Minutes.

During the Battle of Pea Ridge, the battery occupied a highly exposed position near Elkhorn Tavern. On the first day of fighting, the battery suffered heavy casualties and the loss of three guns by a charge of Confederate infantry. However, these pieces were recovered the following day. General Curtis personally commended the battery for providing fire that served as a marker for the Union's Line advance. During the battle, the battery expended 1,200 rounds of ammunition.

=== Defense of Helena and Little Rock ===
Following the victory at Pea Ridge, the battery marched across Arkansas, eventually reaching Helena in July 1862. It participated in the Yazoo Pass Expedition and the Bombardment of Fort Pemberton.

On July 4, 1863, the battery was instrumental in the Battle of Helena. Positioned behind fortifications, the battery helped repulse a determined Confederate assault led by General Theophilus H. Holmes. Despite the intensity of the engagement, the battery suffered no fatalities due to the protection offered by their works.

In Late 1863, the battery joined Frederick Steele's expedition to capture Little Rock. Following the City's Fall, a majority of their members re-enlisted, granting them 'Veteran' Status.

=== Later Service ===
The Final year of their service consisted of garrison duty at Little Rock and escorting supply trains to Fort Smith. In August 1865, the unit was ordered to Fort Smith to provide military presence during a general council with Indian tribes that had been allied with the Confederacy.

The battery traveled to Davenport, Iowa, via steamer, was mustered out of Federal service on October 23, 1865.

== Total strength and casualties ==
A total of 290 men served in the 3rd Iowa Battery at one time or another during its existence. It suffered 3 enlisted men who were killed in action or who died of their wounds and 34 enlisted men who died of disease, for a total of 37 fatalities

== See also ==
- List of Iowa Civil War Units
- Iowa in the American Civil War

== Bibliography ==
- The Civil War Archive
