= Pacific high =

Pacific high may refer to:

- A meteorological term referring to a semi-permanent, subtropical anticyclone:
  - North Pacific High
  - South Pacific High
- Pacific High School (disambiguation)
