= Hanmi =

Hanmi may refer to:

- Hanmi (Aikido), a concept related to movement in the martial art Aikido
- Hanmi Bank, a community bank based in Los Angeles, California
- Hanmi Pharmaceutical, a company based in Seoul, South Korea
