= Senator Nieves =

Senator Nieves may refer to:

- Brian Nieves (born 1965), Missouri State Senate
- Ramón Luis Nieves (born 1975), Senate of Puerto Rico
