= Senator Schatz (disambiguation) =

Brian Schatz (born 1972) is a U.S. senator from Hawaii since 2012. Senator Schatz may also refer to:

- Dave Schatz (born 1963), Missouri State Senate
- Thomas Rivera Schatz (born 1966), Senate of Puerto Rico
