= University of the Pacific =

University of the Pacific may refer to:

- University of the Pacific (Chile)
- University of the Pacific (Colombia)
- University of the Pacific (Peru)
- University of the Pacific (United States)
- University of Asia Pacific, Bangladesh
- University of Asia and the Pacific, a private research university in the Philippines
- University of the South Pacific, an intergovernmental organization and public research university with a number of locations spread throughout a dozen countries in Oceania

== See also ==
- Pacific University, Forest Grove, Oregon, United States
- Alaska Pacific University, Anchorage, Alaska, United States
- Azusa Pacific University, Azusa, California, United States
- Pacific University (India), Udaipur, Rajasthan, India
- Warner Pacific University, Portland, Oregon, United States
