= Emma Talley =

American professional golfer (born 1994)

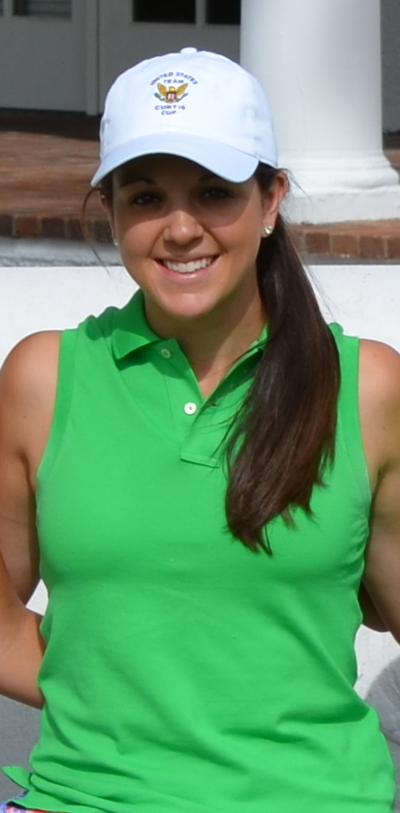
- Talley in 2014

Personal information
- Nationality: United States
- Born: March 23, 1994 (age 32) Paducah, Kentucky, U.S.
- Height: 5 ft 9 in (1.75 m)

Career
- Sport: Golf
- College: University of Alabama
- Turned professional: 2016
- Former tours: Epson Tour; LPGA Tour
- Professional wins: 1

Number of wins by tour
- Epson Tour: 1

Best results in LPGA major championships
- Chevron Championship: T37: 2018
- Women's PGA C'ship: T55: 2018
- U.S. Women's Open: T41: 2018
- Women's British Open: T17: 2014
- Evian Championship: T37: 2018

Achievements and awards
- Honda Sports Award: 2015

Emma Ruth Talley (born March 23, 1994) is an American retired professional golfer who played on the LPGA Tour. While playing as an amateur at the University of Alabama, she won the 2013 U.S. Women's Amateur by defeating Yueer Cindy Feng in the 36-hole final match, 2 and 1.

== Early life ==
Talley was born in Paducah, Kentucky on March 23, 1994. Her parents are Dan and Jennifer Talley. She has an older sister, Leigh Anne, and two brothers, Joe Dan and Jackson. She grew up in Princeton, Kentucky and graduated from Caldwell County High School, where she was a three-time (2008, 2010, 2011) Kentucky state girls golf champion.

== College ==
Talley played golf four years at the University of Alabama. In 2015, she won the NCAA Division I Women's Championship at The Concession Golf Club in Bradenton, Florida, by one stroke (3-under-par 285) over Gaby López of Arkansas and Leona Maguire of Duke. As a junior, she was named the winner of the Honda Sports Award for golf.

Talley was a four-time Women's Golf Coaches Association All-America selection, earning First Team honors as a junior in 2015 and as senior in 2016 after earning Second Team honors in 2013 and Honorable Mention in 2014. She also picked up Second Team All-America honors from Golfweek in 2016.

She was First Team All-SEC in 2016 after earning All-SEC Second Team honors the previous three years.

== Amateur ==
In 2008, Talley was on the victorious U.S. Junior Ryder Cup team, which defeated Europe 22–2. On August 11, 2013, Talley won the U.S. Women's Amateur in a 36-hole finale by defeating Yueer Cindy Feng, 2 & 1. She competed in all the LPGA majors except The Evian Championship in 2014. Her best finish was at the Ricoh Women's British Open with a total score of six-over-par, receiving the low amateur honors.

== Professional career ==
Talley joined the Symetra Tour in 2016. That season saw her compete in 14 tournaments, finishing in the top-10 in three events, including a runner-up finish in the Fuccillo Kia Championship on June 3, where she earned a season-high $12,021. She also tied for second at the Kansas City Championship and tied for fourth at the Tullymore Classic.

In 2018, Talley began her rookie year on the LPGA Tour with two top-10 finishes on her resume: seventh at the Women's Australian Open and fifth at the Hugel-JTBC LA Open. She finished 52nd on the money list with earnings over $420,000 making 21 cuts in 27 events.

In 2021, she had her first runner-up finish at the ISPS Handa World Invitational where she lost in a playoff to Pajaree Anannarukarn on the second extra hole.

Talley announced her retirement from golf in early 2025.

== Personal life ==
Talley married Kiwi professional caddie Patrick Smith in January 2023. They reside outside of Nashville, Tennessee. She is expecting her first child, a girl, in June 2025.

== Professional wins ==
=== Symetra Tour wins ===
- 2017 Island Resort Championship

== Playoff record ==
LPGA Tour playoff record (0–1)

No.	Year	Tournament	Opponent	Result
1	2021	ISPS Handa World Invitational	(Thailand) Pajaree Anannarukarn	Lost to par on second extra hole

== Results in LPGA majors ==
Results not in chronological order.

Tournament	2011	2012	2013	2014	2015	2016	2017	2018	2019	2020	2021	2022	2023
Chevron Championship				CUT				T37	CUT	CUT	CUT	CUT	CUT
Women's PGA Championship				CUT				T55	CUT	CUT		CUT	CUT
U.S. Women's Open	CUT	T46		T63	T60			T41	CUT		CUT		
The Evian Championship ^								T37	CUT	NT	T73	CUT	70
Women's British Open				T17LA				T57		T64	CUT	CUT	

^ The Evian Championship was added as a major in 2013.

Did not play

LA = low amateur
CUT = missed the half-way cut
NT = no tournament
"T" = tied

== U.S. national team appearances ==
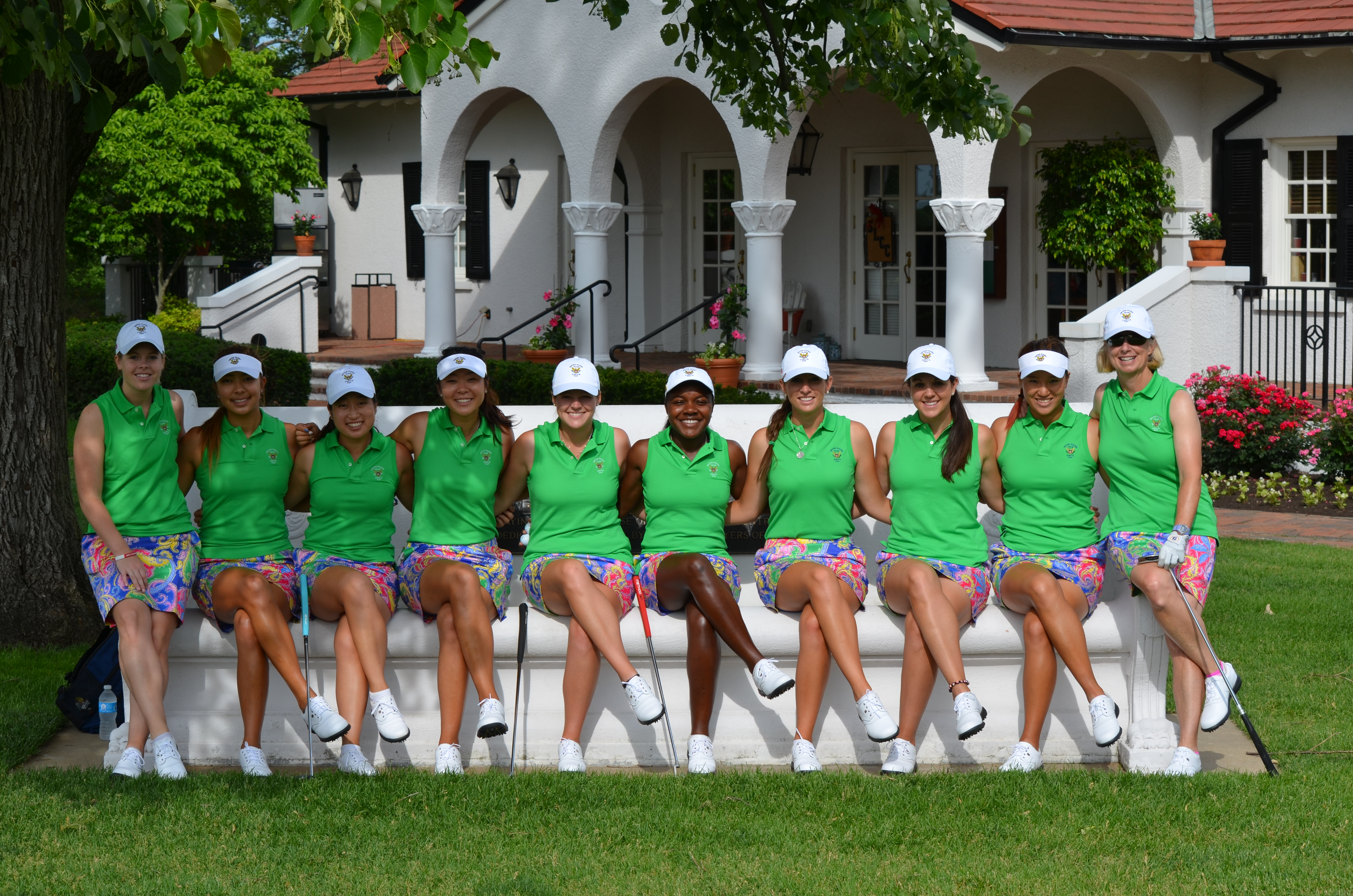
Talley and her teammates on the 2014 Curtis Cup team

Amateur

- Junior Ryder Cup: 2010 (winners)
- Junior Solheim Cup: 2011 (tie, Cup retained)
- Curtis Cup: 2014 (winners)
- Espirito Santo Trophy: 2014
