= Justin Alferman =

American politician

Member of the Missouri House of Representatives from the 61st district
- In office January 7, 2015 – June 4, 2018
- Preceded by: Dave Schatz
- Succeeded by: Aaron Griesheimer

Personal details
- Born: February 3, 1986 (age 40) Washington, Missouri
- Party: Republican

Justin Alferman (born February 3, 1986) is an American politician who served in the Missouri House of Representatives from the 61st district from 2015 to 2018.
