= Red Cedar Inn =

- U.S. National Register of Historic Places
- Red Cedar Inn, Pacific, Missouri

- Location within Missouri
- Location: 1047 East Osage St. Pacific, Missouri 63069; United States
- Coordinates: 38.4817°N 90.7177°W
- Built: 1934
- NRHP reference No.: 03000180
- Added to NRHP: April 2003

The Red Cedar Inn is a historic former inn located in Pacific, Missouri along the U.S. Route 66. Opened shortly after the construction of Route 66 in Pacific and repeal of Prohibition, the Red Cedar Inn provided a significant economic boost to the city.

In 1932, Route 66 reached Pacific, and the town got an economic boost. Before that, Pacific's main commerce had been the mining of silica used to make fine glassware and construction materials, such as bricks. The Red Cedar Inn was a full-service restaurant and served cocktails, since Prohibition had been repealed just before its opening. The inn became popular with travelers on Route 66 and was visited by baseball players Bob Klinger, Dizzy Dean, and Ted Williams.

Brothers James and Bill Smith constructed the inn with rustic materials, such as log and knotty pine interior walls and lines of white chinking on the outside. The logs used to build the restaurant came from the brothers' family farm. They wanted the inn to reflect Missouri pioneer days and attract tourists. The brothers had made their living bootlegging liquor from their family farm at Villa Ridge. However, when Prohibition ended in 1933, their business folded. James and Bill both opened taverns, in Eureka and Fenton, respectively. They built the Red Cedar Inn around the same time on the newly designated Route 66. The restaurant's location made it very successful, and the Smiths added a bar to the restaurant in 1935. In its early years, the inn provided gasoline service from two pumps in front of the building. Gasoline sales were eventually halted to focus efforts on the restaurant business.

Once the brothers were finished building the restaurant, they handed management over to James II. James II later married one of the restaurant's waitresses, Katherine Brinkman, and they bought the business from James I in 1944. They ran the business with their children, James III and Virginia "Ginger" Smith, until 1972, when James II retired. The inn was leased for some time before being temporarily shuttered until 1987. Katherine, James III, and Ginger reopened the restaurant in 1987, and it was managed for several years by Wes Karna before being closed again in 2005.

In April 2003, the inn was listed in the National Register of Historic Places. The restaurant closed in 2005. In 2010, James III began turning the inn into the Historic Red Cedar Business Center. The restaurant's kitchen was changed, but otherwise the structure remained intact. In 2012, the Olson family started a Facebook page for the inn and indicated that it was closed. The city of Pacific bought the building in 2017 for $290,000 with the intent to convert it into a genealogy and history center and museum, although since the purchase the final use of the property has been open to public comment, with an expected final decision to be made in summer 2019.
