= Meramec Valley School District =

School district in Missouri, U.S.

Location
- Franklin County, Missouri United States
- Coordinates: 38°28′59″N 90°45′18″W

District information
- Type: Public school District
- Grades: Kindergarten through 12th grade
- Superintendent: Dr. Carrie Schwierjohn
- Enrollment: 3194

Other information
- Website: www.mvr3.k12.mo.us

Meramec Valley R-III School District is a school district serving portions of Franklin County, Jefferson County, and St. Louis County.

== Boundary ==
In Franklin County, the district includes that county's portion of Pacific as well as most of the Gray Summit and Villa Ridge census-designated places.

In Jefferson County, the district includes that county's portion of Pacific as well as Lake Tekakwitha.

In St. Louis County, the district includes that county's portion of Pacific as well as a piece of Wildwood.

== Schools ==
=== Pre-K ===
- Doris Hoffman Early Learning Center

=== Elementary schools ===
- Coleman Elementary School
- Nike Elementary School
- Robertsville Elementary School
- Zitzman Elementary School

=== Middle schools ===
- Pacific Intermediate
- Riverbend Middle School

=== High schools ===
- Pacific High School
