= Pacifique =

Pacifique (French for "Pacific") may refer to:

- École du Pacifique, a French first language elementary school located in Sechelt, British Columbia, Canada
- Pacifique (album), the 4th studio album and soundtrack by the group Deep Forest released in 2000 by Sony Music / St George label
- Pacifique (band), a French rock music group
- Pacifique Recording Studios, an award-winning mixing and recording studio based in North Hollywood, California

== People ==
- Pacifique Issoïbeka, Congolese political figure who served in the government of Congo-Brazzaville as Minister of Finance from 2005 to 2009
- Pacifique Ndabihawenimana (born 1985), Burundian football referee
- Pacifique Niyongabire (born 2000), a Burundian-Australian footballer
- Pacifique Plante (died 1976), also known as Pax Plante, crime fighting lawyer from the 1940s to the 1950s
- Pacifique de Provins, a French Capuchin Father of the 17th century

== See also ==
- Pacific (disambiguation)
