= Gustav Grauer Farm =

Historic house in Missouri, United States

- U.S. National Register of Historic Places
- Location within Missouri Location within the United States
- Location: N of Pacific, near Pacific, Missouri
- Coordinates: 38°33′56″N 90°44′22″W
- Area: 42.1 acres (17.0 ha)
- Built: c. 1866
- Architectural style: Dogtrot
- NRHP reference No.: 84002142
- Added to NRHP: September 6, 1984

Gustav Grauer Farm, also known as the Maple Springs Farm and Creminscroft, is a historic home and farm located near Pacific, Franklin County, Missouri. The farmhouse was built about 1866 by German immigrants, and is a two-story, enclosed dogtrot log structure that was later clapboarded. Also on the property are the contributing barn, smokehouse spring house, and shed.

It was listed on the National Register of Historic Places in 1984.
