= Aaron Griesheimer =

American politician

Member of the Missouri House of Representatives from the 61st district
- In office 2019 – January 6, 2022
- Preceded by: Justin Alferman
- Succeeded by: Vacant

Personal details
- Party: Republican
- Children: 3
- Parent: John Griesheimer (father)

Aaron Griesheimer is an American politician. In 2019, Griesheimer was elected representative for the 61st district of the Missouri House of Representatives, succeeding Justin Alferman. In 2022, Griesheimer resigned from his position in the state house. He then begin to work for the SITE Improvement Association.
