= Pacific High School =

Pacific High School may refer to:

- Brooklyn Frontiers High School, formerly the home of Pacific High School, in Brooklyn, New York
- Pacific High School (North Highlands, California) in North Highlands, California
- Pacific High School (Missouri) in Pacific, Missouri
- Pacific High School (Port Orford, Oregon)
- Pacific High School (San Bernardino, California)
- Pacific High School (Sitka, Alaska) in Sitka, Alaska
- Pacific High School (Ventura, California) in Ventura, California
- Pacific High School, fictitious organization run by Axact
