= USS Paul Hamilton (DDG-60) =

Guided missile destroyer

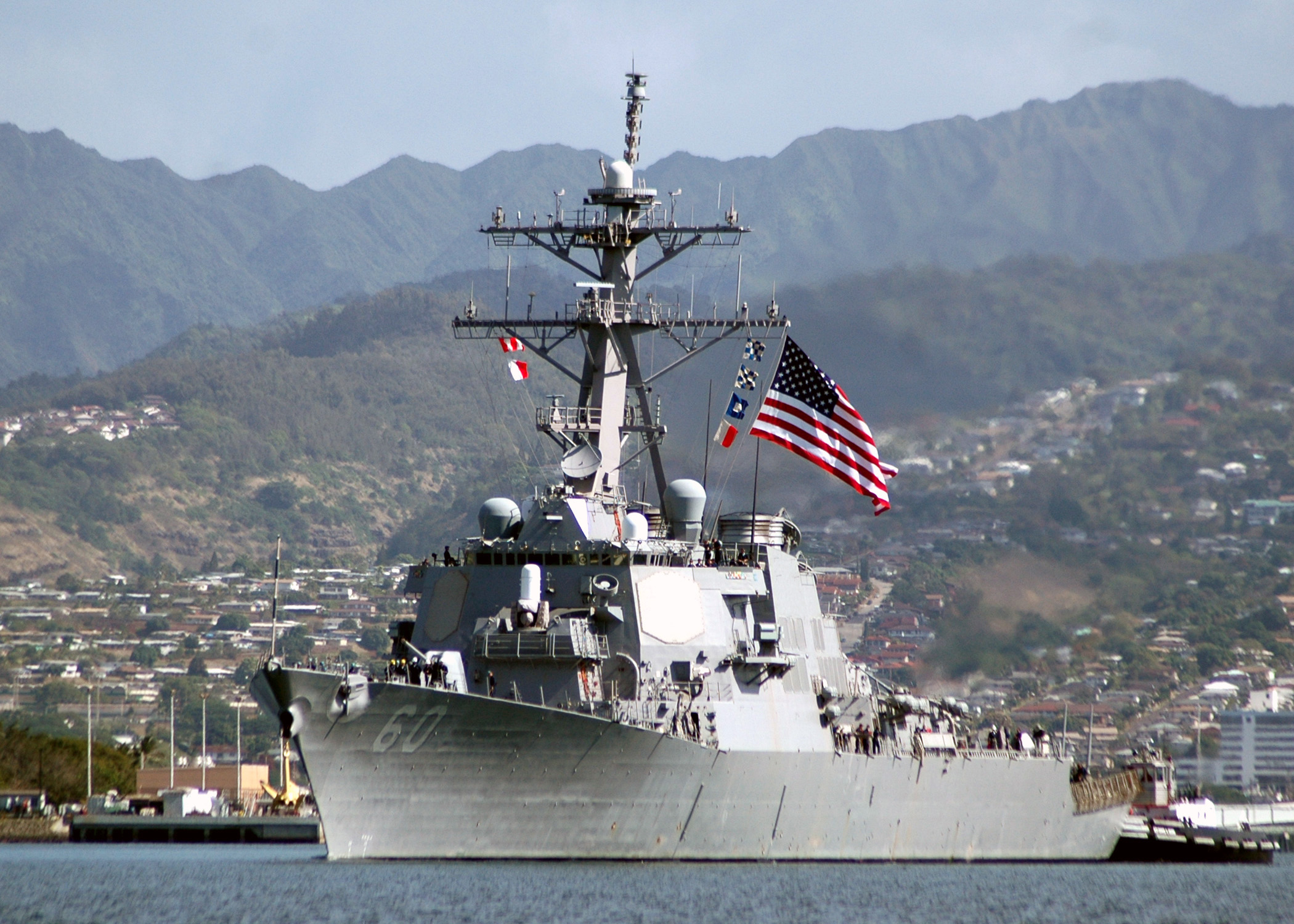
- USS Paul Hamilton at Pearl Harbor on 3 February 2007

History

United States
- Name: Paul Hamilton
- Namesake: Paul Hamilton
- Ordered: 22 February 1990
- Builder: Bath Iron Works
- Laid down: 24 August 1992
- Launched: 24 July 1993
- Commissioned: 27 May 1995
- Home port: San Diego
- Identification: MMSI number: 338916000; Callsign: NNPH; Hull number: DDG-60
- Motto: The Courage to Prevail
- Status: in active service
- Notes: Ship's Flag

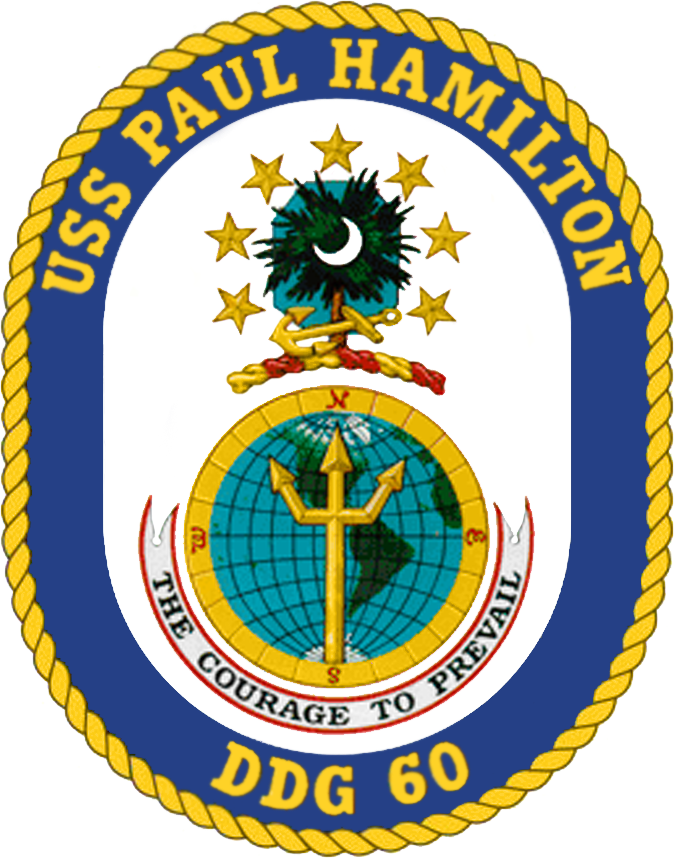
- Badge

General characteristics
- Class & type: Arleigh Burke-class destroyer
- Displacement: Light: approx. 6,800 long tons (6,900 t); Full: approx. 8,900 long tons (9,000 t)
- Length: 505 ft (154 m)
- Beam: 59 ft (18 m)
- Draft: 31 ft (9.4 m)
- Propulsion: 2 × shafts
- Speed: In excess of 30 kn (56 km/h; 35 mph)
- Range: 4,400 nmi (8,100 km; 5,100 mi) at 20 kn (37 km/h; 23 mph)
- Complement: 33 commissioned officers; 38 chief petty officers; 210 enlisted personnel
- Sensors & processing systems: AN/SPY-1D PESA 3D radar (Flight I, II, IIA); AN/SPY-6(V)1 AESA 3D radar (Flight III); AN/SPS-67(V)3 or (V)5 surface search radar (DDG-51 – DDG-118); AN/SPQ-9B surface search radar (DDG-119 onward); AN/SPS-73(V)12 surface search/navigation radar (DDG-51 – DDG-86); BridgeMaster E surface search/navigation radar (DDG-87 onward); 3 × AN/SPG-62 fire-control radar; Mk 46 optical sight system (Flight I, II, IIA); Mk 20 electro-optical sight system (Flight III); AN/SQQ-89 ASW combat system: AN/SQS-53C sonar array; AN/SQR-19 tactical towed array sonar (Flight I, II, IIA); TB-37U multi-function towed array sonar (DDG-113 onward); AN/SQQ-28 LAMPS III shipboard system
- Electronic warfare & decoys: AN/SLQ-32 electronic warfare suite; AN/SLQ-25 Nixie torpedo countermeasures; Mk 36 Mod 12 decoy launching systems; Mk 53 Nulka decoy launching systems; Mk 59 decoy launching systems
- Armament: Guns: 1 × 5-inch (127 mm)/54 mk 45 mod 1/2 (lightweight gun); 2 × 20 mm (0.8 in) Phalanx CIWS; 2 × 25 mm (0.98 in) Mk 38 machine gun system; 4 × 0.50 inches (12.7 mm) caliber guns; Missiles: 2 × Mk 141 Harpoon anti-ship missile launcher; 1 × 29-cell, 1 × 61-cell (90 total cells) Mk 41 vertical launching system (VLS): RIM-66M surface-to-air missile; RIM-156 surface-to-air missile; RIM-161 anti-ballistic missile; BGM-109 Tomahawk cruise missile; RUM-139 vertical launch ASROC; Torpedoes: 2 × Mark 32 triple torpedo tubes: Mark 46 lightweight torpedo; Mark 50 lightweight torpedo; Mark 54 lightweight torpedo
- Aircraft carried: 1 × Sikorsky MH-60R

USS Paul Hamilton (DDG-60) is an Arleigh Burke-class (Flight I) Aegis guided missile destroyer in the United States Navy currently in service. The ship is named after Paul Hamilton, the third United States Secretary of the Navy.

== Construction and career ==
Constructed at Bath Iron Works (BIW) in Bath, Maine, Paul Hamilton was commissioned in Charleston, South Carolina. The destroyer was transferred to Pearl Harbor, Hawaii, after her commissioning. She is currently homeported in San Diego, California.

In 2003, Paul Hamilton was deployed to the Persian Gulf, Where she participated in Operation Shock And Awe.

In 2009, She deployed once again to the Persian Gulf in support of Operation Iraqi Freedom.

In July 2015, she along with the Royal Navy's HMS Duncan, participated in airstrikes against ISIL.

In 2019, the cargo ship Bass Strait, belonging to Hong Kong–based Pacific Basin Shipping Limited, launched a series of drones that surveilled and harassed Paul Hamilton in waters off of Southern California.

== The Moultrie Flag ==
In honor of the ship's namesake Paul Hamilton, a South Carolinian who was an American Revolutionary War soldier and the 42nd governor of South Carolina, USS Paul Hamilton flies the Moultrie Flag, a Revolutionary War battle flag closely associated with South Carolina.
