= Ben Brown (politician) =

American politician and businessman

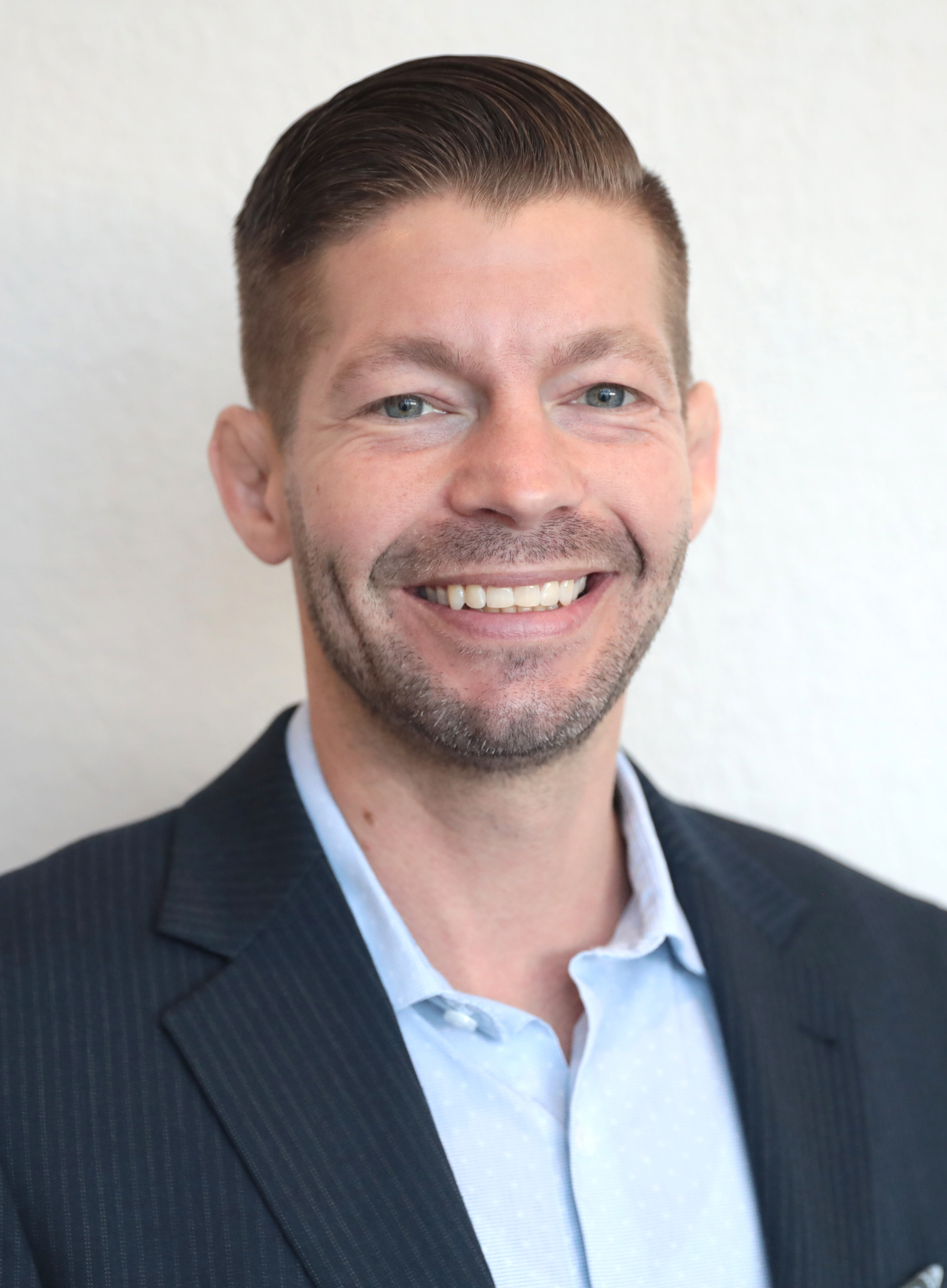
- Brown in 2022

Member of the Missouri Senate from the 26th district
- Incumbent
- Assumed office January 4, 2023
- Preceded by: Dave Schatz

Personal details
- Born: Benjamin Brown
- Party: Republican
- Children: 3

Benjamin "Ben" Brown is an American politician and businessman serving as a member of the Missouri Senate for the 26th district. Elected in November 2022, he assumed office on January 4, 2023.

== Early life ==
Brown graduated from Lafayette High School and attended the University of Missouri.

== Career ==
After leaving the University of Missouri, Brown pursued a career in mixed martial arts. In 2013, he founded Satchmo's Bar & Grill in Chesterfield, Missouri. He was also a member of the Young Republicans for Missouri and chaired the Franklin County Republican Central Committee. From 2021 to 2021, Brown hosted a radio show on WVFT. Brown was elected to the Missouri Senate in November 2022.

In 2025, Brown proposed two bills related to state revenue. One would change state income tax to a flat tax and the other is a constitutional amendment that would expand eligibility for sales taxes. This is seen as a part of a wider plan to eliminate income tax, which has already seen reductions in Missouri. Lawmakers expressed concerns over the impact of increased sales tax, which would be necessary to cover lost revenue from income taxes, on their constituents, particularly for repealed exemptions on labor or farming necessities.

Brown sponsored a bill to block prosecution for those who believe their use of force was in self-defense. While existing Missouri law allows for self-defense claims in cases of deadly violence, the proposed legislation would bypass a hearing before a jury with full evidence. The bill was previously filed by Eric Burlison in the 2022 session and received bipartisan opposition, including from law enforcement and a prosecuting attorney who described it as the “Make Murder Legal Act.”
