= Brian Nieves =

American politician

Missouri Senate Majority Whip
- In office January 5, 2013 – January 8, 2015
- Preceded by: Mike Parson
- Succeeded by: Sandy Crawford

Member of the Missouri Senate from the 26th district
- In office January 5, 2011 – January 8, 2015
- Preceded by: John Griesheimer
- Succeeded by: Dave Schatz

Personal details
- Born: June 19, 1965 (age 61)
- Party: Republican
- Spouse: Julie Nieves
- Children: 3

Brian D. Nieves is a former Republican member of the Missouri Senate, and a former majority whip in the Missouri House of Representatives.

== Personal life ==
Nieves is a graduate of Pacific High School in Franklin County. In 1984, Nieves enlisted in the United States Navy, serving ten years as a Hospital Corpsman, as a field medic alongside the Marines.

Following his military service, Nieves returned to Franklin County. Nieves hosted a morning talk radio show called "The Patriot Enclave" on KWMO 1350 AM and functioned as KWMO's marketing director. He and his wife also operate Nieves Enterprises and Hwy 66 Auto Sales. Additionally, Nieves serves as a high school substitute teacher.

== Controversy ==
In August 2010, Nieves was accused of assaulting and threatening to kill an opponent's campaign worker, Shawn Bell, following a contentious primary election which Nieves won, during a visit by Bell to Nieves' campaign headquarters while he and his campaign manager were winding down the campaign. Nieves denied any assault had occurred and his campaign manager, who was present during the entire visit by Bell, concurred with this denial. On September 10, 2010, Franklin County Prosecutor Bob Parks announced he would not be seeking criminal charges against Nieves, commenting that he could not prove that a criminal act had occurred. Shawn Bell announced in a statement that he still planned to file a civil lawsuit against Nieves.

In April 2013, media outlets covered an exchange of emails between Nieves and an angry constituent. Nieves insulted the constituent's appearance and suggested that if he typed slower the constituent may find it easier to understand.

== Elected office ==
A new 98th District was created after redistricting following the 2000 census. The 110th and 98th merged into the new (98th) District. In 2002, Nieves ran to replace outgoing State Representatives May Scheve(D) and Francis Overschmidt(D). Nieves won a primary race against Dave Bailey, and won a general election contest against Tom Herbst. He won reelection in 2004, 2006, and 2008. His term expired in 2010, at which point he ran to succeed John Griesheimer as a state senator. In 2014, Nieves ran an unsuccessful campaign for the position of Recorder of Deeds in Franklin County, Missouri, losing in the Republican primary. In January 2013, he was elected to Majority Whip of the Senate.

== Electoral history ==
2010 General Election for Missouri's 26th Senate District
Party	Candidate	Votes	%	±%
Republican	Brian Nieves	42,112	65.6	
Democratic	George (Boots) Weber	19,063	29.7	
Constitution	Richard Newton	2,988	4.7	

2010 Republican Primary for Missouri's 26th Senate District
Party	Candidate	Votes	%	±%
Republican	Brian Nieves	13,157	44.1	
Republican	Dick Stratman	6,300	21.1	
Republican	Donald Meyer	1,003	3.4	
Republican	Jack Jackson	9,346	31.4	

2008 General Election for Missouri's 98th District House of Representatives
Party	Candidate	Votes	%	±%
Republican	Brian Nieves	10,356	60.0	
Democratic	Jim Mense	6,909	40.0	

2006 General Election for Missouri's 98th District House of Representatives
Party	Candidate	Votes	%	±%
Republican	Brian Nieves	7,470	57.2	
Democratic	Jim Mense	5,585	42.8	

2004 General Election for Missouri's 98th District House of Representatives
Party	Candidate	Votes	%	±%
Republican	Brian Nieves	9,816	62.4	
Democratic	Gloria Sennert	5,924	37.6	

2002 General Election for Missouri's 98th District House of Representatives
Party	Candidate	Votes	%	±%
Republican	Brian Nieves	6,141	53.8	
Democratic	Tom Herbst	5,272	46.2	

2002 Primary Election for Missouri's 98th District House of Representatives
Party	Candidate	Votes	%	±%
Republican	Brian Nieves	2,297	57.3	
Democratic	Dave Bailey	1,710	42.7	
