= Mokuroku =

Japanese martial arts catalog and license

Mokuroku (Japanese: 目録) is a term in Japanese martial arts, used by koryu, for a "catalog", referring to a catalog of the level of ability of the instructor of the martial arts that has received a catalog as a sign of level or initiation.

Mokuroku can be literally translated as catalog, however the meaning and implications of a Mokuroku extend far beyond a simple list of items, and form a critical documentary evidence of credential for members of ryu that use them. While Mokuroku is used as a martial arts license of level, the position refers to proficiency with a catalog of ability of the instructor. The Dai-Mokuroku / Menkyo-Kaiden (Japanese: 大目録 / 免許皆伝) scroll is the highest rank of the school and certifies that the individual is a full master of the tradition.

Mokuroku are usually in the format of a Makimono or hand written scrolls structured by convention to follow a specific layout going from right to left. The structure of a Mokuroku in koryu is set by convention. Reading from left to right, a Mokuroku will contain the ryu's name; the chronology of all the heads of the ryu; the names of the techniques or knowledge which forms the catalogue; the signature and a patented stamp of the person issuing the Mokuroku—usually the Soke of the school (if either are missing then the Mokuroku may be considered to be illegitimate or of dubious origin); and finally the name and title of person whom the Mokuroku is being license to.

The names of the techniques are often figurative or poetic, and give no indication as to how perform a specific technique. It is not uncommon to find poetry, uncommon kanji or regional expressions and idioms interspersed into the Mokuroku. Mokuroku, can often also be deceptive, containing nonsensical kanji, and expressions aimed at deliberately obscuring the meaning of an item.
