= Scrip bid =

In Australia, a scrip bid is a takeover offer where shares are offered partly or wholly in place of cash. This means that, if a take over bid is accepted, shareholders in the target company will receive shares in the new merged entity. This has advantageous tax implications for investors as gains on the sale of shares acquired on or after 19 September 1985 are subject to capital gains tax. By receiving shares instead of cash the realisation of the capital asset can be delayed to take better advantage of capital loss offsets. Additionally, tax payers are only taxed on half the capital gain if they hold the asset for more than 12 months.
