= Hanmi Bank =

Community bank based in Los Angeles

Hanmi Financial Corporation
- Company type: Public
- Traded as: Nasdaq: HAFC; S&P 600 Component
- Industry: Banking
- Founded: 1982; 44 years ago
- Headquarters: Los Angeles, California, United States
- Key people: Bonnie Lee (president and CEO)
- Revenue: $5.57 billion
- Number of employees: 611

Korean name
- Hangul: 한미은행
- Hanja: 韓美銀行
- RR: Hanmi eunhaeng
- MR: Hanmi ŭnhaeng
- Website: hanmi.com

Hanmi Bank Corporation is a community bank headquartered in Los Angeles, California, with 35 branches and eight loan production offices in California, Texas, Illinois, New York, New Jersey and Virginia.

Hanmi Bank specializes in real estate, commercial, Small Business Administration loans and trade finance lending to small and middle market businesses. It is a wholly owned subsidiary of Hanmi Financial Corporation, Inc.

In 2023, Hanmi Bank was ranked #9 on Bank Director's Top 25 U.S. Banks list.

== History ==
The bank was established in 1982. Originally it was founded to serve the Korean American community in Los Angeles.

The bank was founded by George S. Chey, who served as Chairman of the Board for 10 years after its startup.

In 1987, the Hanmi Bank conducted its IPO and is listed on Nasdaq.

The bank bought the First Global Bank and the Pacific Union Bank and the Chun Ha Insurance Agency. In 2001, the company listed on Nasdaq. Subsequently, the bank expanded to include insurance and wealth management services.

In 2014, it acquired United Central Bank.

In 2015, it dropped its bid to acquire the larger BBCN Bancorp, paving the way for BBCN to merge with another Koreatown rival, Wilshire Bancorp, as Bank of Hope.
