= Pacific High School (North Highlands, California) =

Pacific Career Technology High School

Location
- 6560 Melrose Dr. North Highlands, California; United States
- Coordinates: 38°41′4″N 121°22′21″W

Information
- Other name: Pacific High School
- Former name: Grant Union Continuation High School
- Established: 1981; 45 years ago
- School district: Twin Rivers Unified School District
- Teaching staff: 11.27 (FTE) (2023–2024)
- Grades: 9–12
- Enrollment: 78 (2023–2024)
- Student to teacher ratio: 6.92 (2023–2024)
- Campus: Large suburban
- Accreditation: WASC/Cognia
- Website: phs.twinriversusd.org

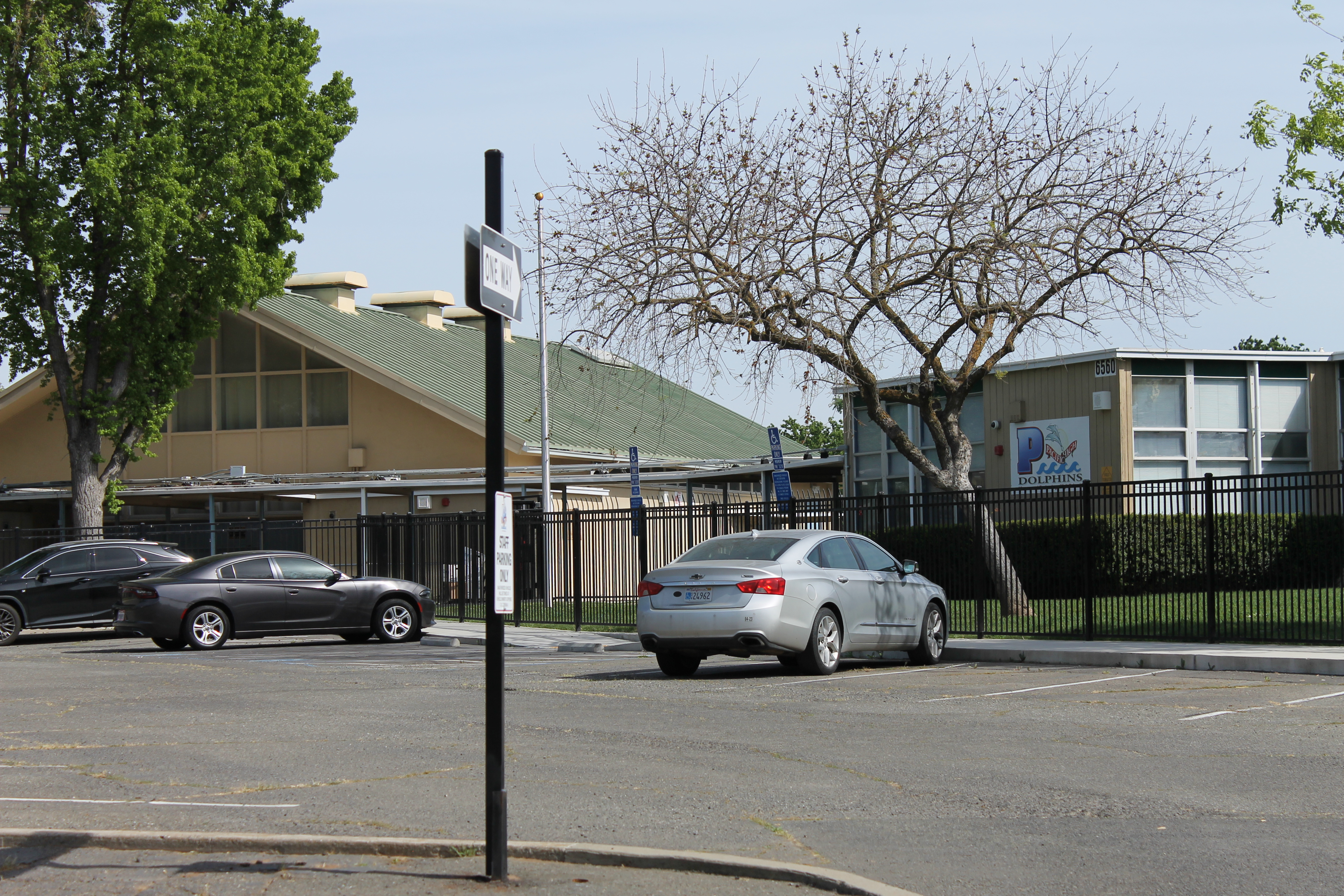
Pacific High School viewed from Melrose Drive.

Pacific Career Technology High School (PCTHS) (also known as Pacific High School) is a high school in the Twin Rivers Unified School District located in North Highlands, California.
