= Pacific High School (Missouri) =

American high school in Missouri

Location
- 425 Indian Warpath Drive; Pacific, Franklin County, Missouri 63069; United States; 38°29′07″N 90°46′51″W

Information
- Type: Public high school
- School district: Meramec Valley School District
- Principal: Keith Orris
- Teaching staff: 58.51 (FTE)
- Grades: 9–12
- Enrollment: 951 (2022–23)
- Student to teacher ratio: 16.25
- Colors: Purple and white
- Athletics conference: Four Rivers
- Nickname: Indians
- Website: mvr3.k12.mo.us/o/phs

Pacific High School is a public high school in Pacific, Missouri, part of the Meramec Valley School District.

== About ==
In 2025 it had almost 1,000 students enrolled in grades 9–12. More than 88 percent of students were white during the 2023–24 school year. The school's location is documented as "fringe town". The Indians are the mascot. The school has a hall of fame.

In 2024, a meeting at the school was held to discuss declining enrollment at the county's elementary schools and proposals to close two of them. In 2025, a bond measure was proposed for the construction of a middle school on the high school campus.

== Athletics ==
In the 1920s when W. T. Leezy was as the track coach, the team had a five year unbeaten streak. The school made national headlines in 1923 after a student broke the world record for the women's high school high jump.

In 1994, the girls' volleyball team won a state championship. George Hinkle Jr. coached the school's football team.

== Notable alumni ==
- George Hinkle, former NFL defensive end
- Brian Nieves, former state legislator
- Catherine Maguire, track athlete, teacher, and foster mom
- Linda Wells, softball player and coach
