= Dave Schatz =

American politician (born 1963)

President pro tempore of the Missouri Senate
- In office January 9, 2019 – January 4, 2023
- Preceded by: Ron Richard
- Succeeded by: Caleb Rowden

Member of the Missouri Senate from the 26th district
- In office January 7, 2015 – January 4, 2023
- Preceded by: Brian Nieves
- Succeeded by: Ben Brown

Member of the Missouri House of Representatives from the 61st district
- In office January 5, 2011 – January 7, 2015
- Preceded by: Chris Carter
- Succeeded by: Justin Alferman

Personal details
- Born: November 28, 1963 (age 62)
- Party: Republican
- Spouse: Chara
- Children: 5

Dave Schatz (born November 28, 1963) is an American businessman, Republican former member of the Missouri Senate, and former state representative. He was first elected in 2014 with 73% of the vote over Democrat Lloyd Klinedinst. He served as the President Pro Tempore of the Missouri Senate between 2019 and 2023.

== Personal life ==
Schatz and his wife, Chara, have 5 children; David, Daniel, Devon, Dana, and Dailee. They reside in Sullivan, Missouri and attend Temple Baptist Church.

== Electoral history ==
=== State representative ===
Missouri House of Representatives Primary Election, August 3, 2010, District 111
Party	Candidate	Votes	%	±%
Republican	Dave Schatz	4,011	72.72%	
Republican	Justin K. Charboneau	1,505	27.28%	

Missouri House of Representatives Election, November 2, 2010, District 111
Party	Candidate	Votes	%	±%
Republican	Dave Schatz	8,554	71.84%	+15.36
Democratic	Tod DeVeydt	3,353	28.16%	−15.36

Missouri House of Representatives Election, November 6, 2012, District 61
Party	Candidate	Votes	%	±%
Republican	Dave Schatz	12,478	72.19%	+0.35
Democratic	Michael Sage	4,808	27.81%	−0.35

=== State Senate ===
Missouri Senate Primary Election, August 5, 2014, District 26
Party	Candidate	Votes	%	±%
Republican	Dave Schatz	17,643	100.00%	

Missouri Senate Election, November 4, 2014, District 26
Party	Candidate	Votes	%	±%
Republican	Dave Schatz	37,219	72.94%	+7.31
Democratic	Lloyd Klinedinst	13,808	27.06%	−2.65

Missouri Senate Election, November 6, 2018, District 26
Party	Candidate	Votes	%	±%
Republican	Dave Schatz	53,507	63.89%	−9.05
Democratic	John Kiehne	30,237	36.11%	+9.05

Missouri Senate
Preceded by Ron Richard	President pro tempore of the Missouri Senate; 2019–2023	Succeeded by Caleb Rowden
