= Pacific Basin Shipping Limited =

Hong Kong shipping company

Pacific Basin Shipping Limited 太平洋航運集團有限公司
- Company type: Public
- Traded as: SEHK: 2343
- Industry: Shipping
- Founded: 1987
- Headquarters: 31/F One Island South, 2 Heung Yip Road, Wong Chuk Hang, Hong Kong
- Area served: Hong Kong
- Key people: Stanley H. Ryan (Chairman); Martin Fruergaard (CEO)
- Website: www.pacificbasin.com

Pacific Basin Shipping Limited is a maritime transport company engaged in international dry bulk shipping through the operation of a fleet of vessels to carry diverse cargoes for many of the world's leading commodity groups. Pacific Basin operates a fleet of Handysize and Supramax vessels globally.

== History ==
Pacific Basin was first founded as Pacific Basin Bulk Shipping Limited, a bulk carrier operator, in 1987, but it was acquired and privatized by an independent company in 1996. However, the former senior management reestablished the company as Pacific Basin Shipping Limited in 1998. Pacific Basin Shipping Limited was listed on the Hong Kong Stock Exchange in 2004.

=== MV Bass Strait ===
Pacific Basin is the owner and operator of MV Bass Strait, a cargo ship thought to have launched a series of drones that surveilled and harassed United States Navy ships, including the USS Paul Hamilton, in waters off of Southern California in 2019, according to documents released to The Drive under the Freedom of Information Act.
