= City Pacific Finance Stakes =

Australian thoroughbred horse race

The City Pacific Finance Stakes is a Group 3 Australian thoroughbred horse race for horses aged 3 years old over a distance of 1200m.

Prior to a name change the race was named in honour of champion trainer Colin Hayes.

It is held annually at Moonee Valley Racecourse in Melbourne.

== History ==
- 1985 onwards held over 1200m
- 1985 – 1989 was a Listed Race
- 1990 onwards Group 3
- 1985 - 1989 the race was known as the ‘Red Anchor Stakes’
- 1990 - 2005 the race was known as the ‘C S Hayes Stakes’
- 2006 onwards the race has been called the ‘City Pacific Finance Stakes’.

== Winners ==
- 2009 - Fair Trade
- 2008 - Playwright
- 2007 - Royal Asscher
- 2006 - Corton Charlemagne
- 2005 - Coronga
- 2004 - Oratorio
- 2003 - Youth
- 2002 - Yell
- 2001 - Deprave
- 2000 - Sound The Alarm
- 1999 - Prizefighter
- 1998 - Sedation
- 1997 - Towkay
- 1996 - Spartacus
- 1995 - Captive
- 1994 - Cannibal King
- 1993 - Sequalo
- 1992 - Snow Lord
- 1991 - Hula Grey
- 1990 - Begone
- 1989 - Hot Arch
- 1988 - Clay Hero
- 1987 - Christmas Tree
- 1986 - Rubiton
- 1985 - Seiger
