= Bank of Hope =

Korean American bank in Los Angeles

Hope Bancorp, Inc.

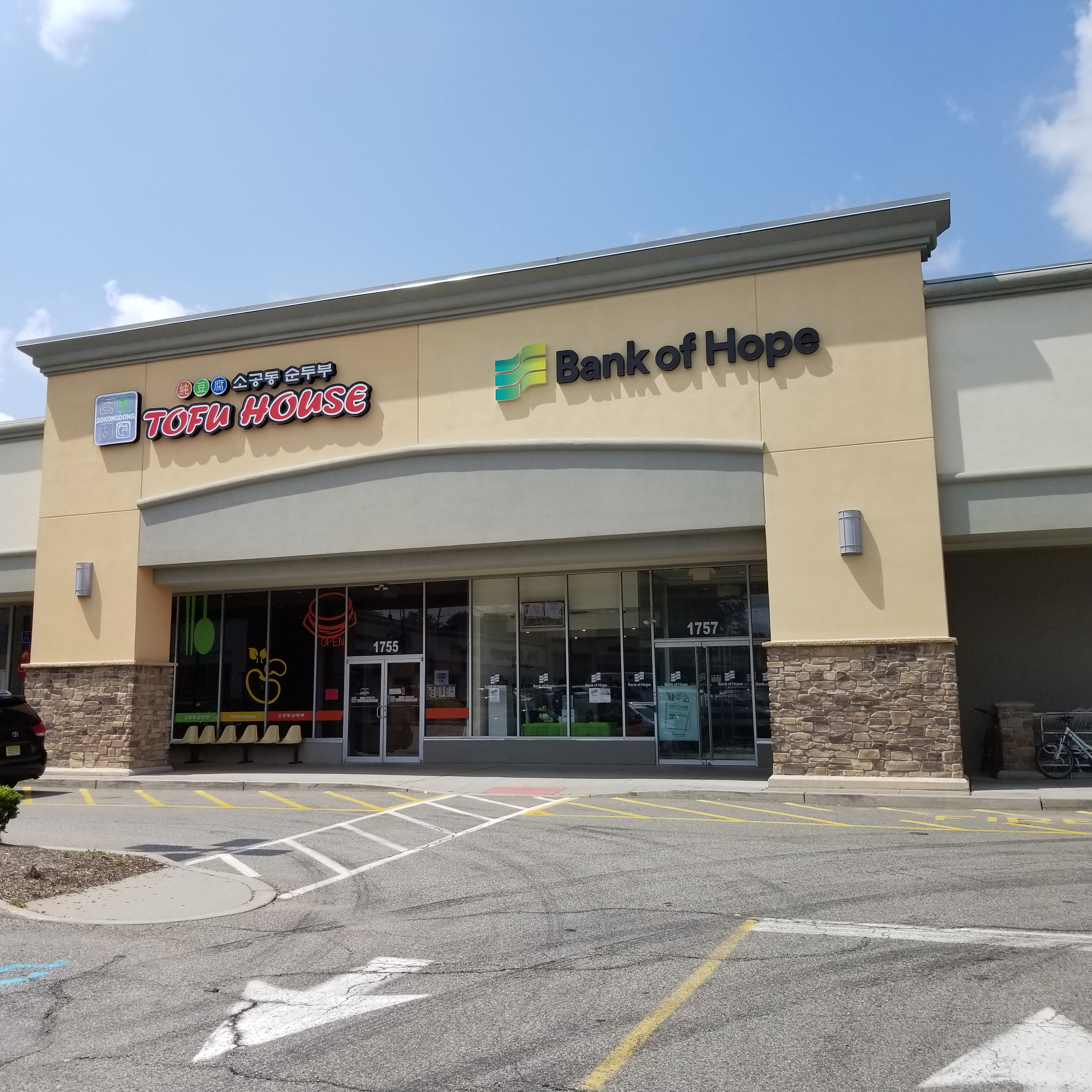
- Bank of Hope branch in Edison, New Jersey
- Company type: Public
- Traded as: Nasdaq: HOPE; S&P 600 component
- Industry: Banking
- Founded: June 5, 2000; 26 years ago
- Headquarters: Koreatown, Los Angeles, California, US
- Key people: Kevin S. Kim (president) & CEO; Peter J. Koh (SEVP & COO); Julianna Balicka (CFO)
- Revenue: ▲$0.630 billion (2022)
- Net income: ▲$0.218 billion (2022)
- Total assets: ▲$18.09 billion (2022)
- Total equity: ▲$1.982 billion (2019)
- Number of employees: 1,545 (2022)
- Website: www.bankofhope.com

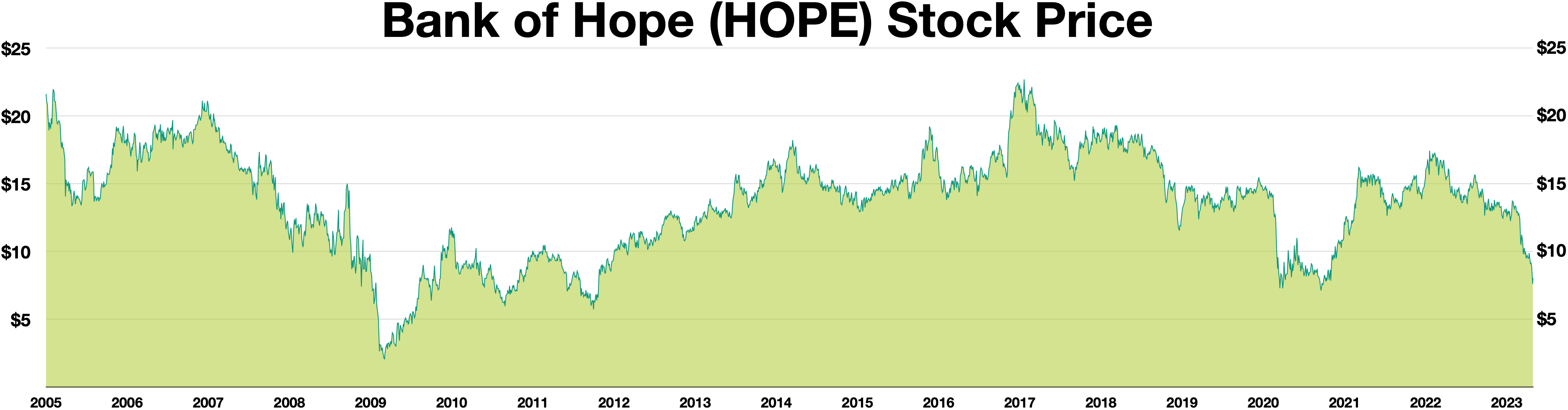
Bank of Hope (HOPE) Stock Price

Bank of Hope is an American bank, based in Los Angeles, that focuses on the Korean American community. The bank was first established on December 30, 1980, under the name Wilshire Bank.

On November 30, 2011, Nara Bank, which was established in 1989, merged with Center Financial Corporation, which was established in 1986. Nara Bancorp, Inc., changed its name to BBCN Bancorp, Inc. Center Bank changed its name to BBCN Bank. BBCN was an acronym for Business Bank of Center and Nara.

On February 15, 2013, the company acquired Pacific International Bancorp, the holding company for Pacific International Bank, a Washington state–chartered bank with four branches in the Seattle metropolitan area.

In August 2013, the company acquired Foster Bankshares, Inc., and became the largest Korean American Bank in Chicago.

In July 2016, BBCN Bank and Wilshire Bank merged and were rebranded as Bank of Hope, with Hope Bancorp, Inc., as the bank holding company.

In 2017, the bank almost acquired U & I Financial Corp, based in Seattle, but the acquisition was called off at the last minute.

In August 2017, the bank opened a branch in Houston.

In late 2020, the Wall Street Journal reported that the bank faced over $3 billion of loans with payment deferrals or modifications due to the COVID-19 pandemic, which represented 170% of the bank's tier-1 capital. Over 50% of the bank's assets were in the form of commercial real-estate loans, the second-highest ratio of all banks in its size class.

On April 2, 2025, the bank merged with Territorial Bancorp, operating as Territorial Savings Bank with 29 branches in Hawaii, which was rebranded as Territorial Savings, a division of Bank of Hope.
