= University of the Pacific (Colombia) =

Public university in Buenaventura, Colombia

- Universidad del Pacífico
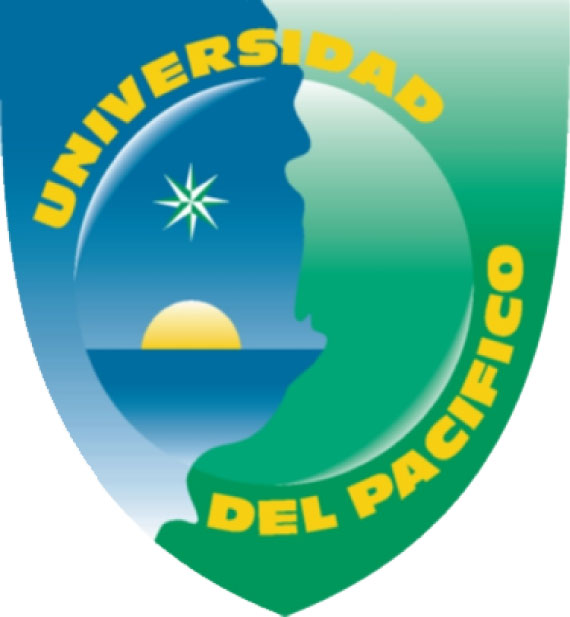
- Type: Public, National
- Established: December 14, 1988 (33 years)
- Rector: Arlyn Valverde Solis
- Location: Buenaventura, Valle del Cauca, Colombia; 3.8478°N 76.9992°W
- Website: unipacifico.edu.co

The University of the Pacific (Spanish: Universidad del Pacifico) is a public, national university based primarily in the city of Buenaventura, Valle del Cauca, Colombia. The university also has several satellite campuses across the Pacific/Chocó natural region in the cities of Guapi in the Cauca Department and Tumaco in the Nariño Department.

== See also ==
- List of universities in Colombia
