= John Griesheimer =

American politician

John E. Griesheimer (born July 19, 1952, Saint Clair, Missouri) is a Republican politician from Missouri. He is a former Missouri State Representative, a former Missouri State Senator, a former Franklin County Commissioner and a former Franklin County Presiding Commissioner.

== Family ==
He currently resides with his wife, Rita Maune, in Washington, Missouri. They have three children Sean (wife Rachel), Aaron (wife Amanda), and Michelle.

== Career ==
He graduated from East Central College in Union, Missouri. He started his political career as a member of the Washington city council (1982–1988). He went on to serve in the Franklin County, Missouri, commission (1989–1992), the Missouri House of Representatives (1992–2002), the Missouri State Senate (2002–2010) and as Franklin County Presiding Commissioner (2010-2018).
