= University of the Pacific (Chile) =

Private university in Chile

Coordinates: 33.3786°S 70.5280°W

- Universidad del Pacífico
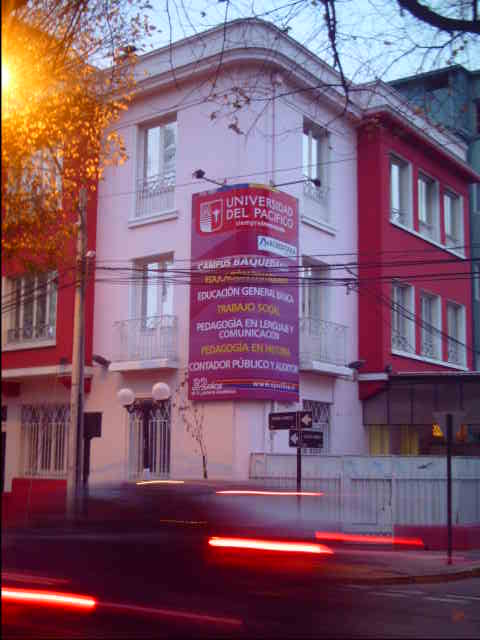
- View of the University of the Pacific
- Location: Santiago de Chile, Chile
- Website: http://www.upacifico.cl/

University of the Pacific (Spanish: Universidad del Pacífico) is a private university in Chile. It was founded in 1990 and the main headquarters is in Santiago de Chile.

The university has faced significant financial troubles in recent years. According to an investigation by CIPER Chile, the Ortúzar family, who controlled the university, engaged in a complex web of real estate transactions and related-party deals that drained the university's resources. Between 2009 and 2013, the university paid rent to a foundation owned by the Ortúzar family. The university also paid salaries to Ortúzar family members who held executive positions.

On January 30, 2019, after an investigation into administrative, financial, and labor irregularities, the Ministry of Education communicated the request for closure and revocation of recognition to the National Council of Education Its students had to be redistributed to other institutions in Chile.

Its operations were terminated on January 31, 2022.
