= Toxic waste =

Any unwanted material which can cause harm

Toxic waste is any unwanted material in all forms that can cause harm (e.g. by being inhaled, swallowed, or absorbed through the skin). Mostly generated by industry, consumer products like televisions, computers, and phones contain toxic chemicals that can pollute the air and contaminate soil and water. Disposing of such waste is a major public health issue. Increased rates of cancer in humans and animals are linked to exposure to toxic chemicals. Toxic waste disposal is often seen as an environmental justice problem, as toxic waste is disproportionately dumped in or near marginalized communities.

== Classifying toxic materials ==
Toxic materials are poisonous byproducts as a result of industries such as manufacturing, farming, construction, automotive, laboratories, and hospitals which may contain heavy metals, radiation, dangerous pathogens, or other toxins. Toxic waste has become more abundant since the Industrial Revolution, causing serious global issues. Disposing of such waste has become even more critical with the addition of numerous technological advances containing toxic chemical components. Products such as cellular telephones, computers, televisions, and solar panels contain toxic chemicals that can harm the environment if not disposed of properly to prevent air pollution and the contamination of soils and water. A material is considered toxic when it causes death or harm by being inhaled, swallowed, or absorbed through the skin.

The waste can contain chemicals, heavy metals, radiation, dangerous pathogens, or other toxins. Even households generate hazardous waste from items such as batteries, used computer equipment, and leftover paints or pesticides. Toxic material can be either human-made and others are naturally occurring in the environment. Not all hazardous substances are considered toxic.

The United Nations Environment Programme (UNEP) has identified 11 key substances that pose a risk to human health:

- Arsenic: used in making electrical circuits, as an ingredient in pesticides, and as a wood preservative. It is classified as a carcinogen.
- Asbestos: is a material that was once used for the insulation of buildings, and some businesses are still using this material to manufacture roofing materials and brakes. Inhalation of asbestos fibers can lead to lung cancer and asbestosis.
- Cadmium: is found in batteries and plastics. It can be inhaled through cigarette smoke or digested when included as a pigment in food. Exposure leads to lung damage, irritation of the digestive tract, and kidney disease.
- Chromium: is used as brick lining for high-temperature industrial furnaces, as a solid metal used for making steel, and in chrome plating, manufacturing dyes and pigments, wood preserving, and leather tanning. It is known to cause cancer, and prolonged exposure can cause chronic bronchitis and damage lung tissue.
- Clinical wastes: such as syringes and medication bottles can spread pathogens and harmful microorganisms, leading to a variety of illnesses.
- Cyanide: a poison found in some pesticides and rodenticides. In large doses, it can lead to paralysis, convulsions, and respiratory distress.
- Lead: is found in batteries, paints, and ammunition. When ingested or inhaled can cause harm to the nervous and reproductive systems, and kidneys.
- Mercury: used for dental fillings and batteries. It is also used in the production of chlorine gas. Exposure can lead to birth defects and kidney and brain damage
- PCBs, or polychlorinated biphenyls, are used in many manufacturing processes, by the utility industry, and in paints and sealants. Damage can occur through exposure, affecting the nervous, reproductive, and immune systems, as well as the liver.
- POPs, persistent organic pollutants. They are found in chemicals and pesticides and may lead to nervous and reproductive system defects. They can bio-accumulate in the food chain or persist in the environment and be moved great distances through the atmosphere.
- Strong acids and alkalis used in manufacturing and industrial production. They can destroy tissue and cause internal damage to the body.

Toxic waste can be reactive, ignitable, and corrosive. In the United States, these wastes are regulated under the Resource Conservation and Recovery Act (RCRA).

- Reactive wastes are those that can cause explosions when heated, mixed with water or compressed. They can release toxic gases into the air. They are unstable even in normal conditions. An example is lithium–sulfur batteries.
- Ignitable wastes have flash points of less than 60 degrees Celsius. They are very combustible and can cause fires. Examples are solvents and waste oils.
- Corrosive wastes are liquids capable of corroding metal containers. These are acids or bases that have pH levels of less than or equal to 2, or greater than or equal to 12.5. An example is battery acid.

With the increase of worldwide technology, there are more substances that are considered toxic and harmful to human health. Technology growth at this rate is extremely daunting for civilization and can eventually lead to more harm/negative outcomes. Some of this technology includes cell phones and computers. Such items have been given the name e-waste or EEE, which stands for Electrical and Electronic Equipment. This term is also used for goods such as refrigerators, toys, and washing machines. These items can contain toxic components that can break down into water systems when discarded. The reduction in the cost of these goods has allowed for these items to be distributed globally without thought or consideration to managing the goods once they become ineffective or broken.

In the US, the Environmental Protection Agency (EPA) and state environmental agencies develop and enforce regulations on the storage, treatment, and disposal of hazardous waste. The EPA requires that toxic waste be handled with special precautions, and be disposed of in designated facilities around the country. Also, many US cities have collection days where household toxic waste is gathered. Some materials that may not be accepted at regular landfills are ammunition, commercially generated waste, explosives/shock sensitive items, hypodermic needles/syringes, medical waste, radioactive materials, and smoke detectors.

Household products can be identified by warning labels that may include the storage or disposal of certain products. Within an average US household, there are approximately 15.5 pounds of hazardous material disposed of each year. To reduce a household's toxic waste, the New Hampshire Department of Environmental Services recommends that consumers be more cautious when buying products and try to avoid those with warning labels. Furthermore, following safe storage procedures and always working cautiously when using chemical-filled household products.

== Hazardous effects ==
=== Environmental Impacts ===
Toxic waste has a variety of impacts on the environment. It has the potential to contaminate soil, lower air quality, pollute waterways, and increase wildfire risks. As hazardous chemicals enter the environment, it is difficult to remove them. As a result of the decomposition process of toxic waste, many harmful chemicals are released into the atmosphere.

=== Human Health Impacts ===
Toxic wastes often contain carcinogens, and exposure to these by some route, such as leakage or evaporation from the storage, causes cancer to appear at increased frequency in exposed individuals. For example, a cluster of the rare blood cancer polycythemia vera was found around a toxic waste dump site in northeast Pennsylvania in 2008.

Human health risks associated with exposure to toxic waste include cancer of the stomach, liver, lungs, and kidneys. Additionally, ischemic heart disease, leukemia, asthma hospitalization, and preterm birth are all linked to exposure to these toxic chemicals. Hospitalization rates of children 0–19 years old were found to be up to an average of 60% greater for leukemia cases and 16% greater for malignant tumors when children are exposed to toxic waste. Additionally, adults are put at a much greater risk of testis and breast tumors. Studies have found that female exposure to toxic waste can cause up to a 15% increase in mortality from breast tumors. Male exposure leads to a 19% increase in mortality for breast tumors and 76% increase of death rates from testis tumors.

Additionally, toxic waste can have serious effects on kids because their bodies and brains are still developing, making them more sensitive to harmful chemicals. Exposure to pollutants like lead, mercury, and other toxins has been linked to cognitive disabilities, including lower IQ, attention disorders, and learning difficulties. These effects can impact a child's ability to succeed in school and follow normal developmental milestones.

=== Wildlife Impacts ===
As harmful chemicals from toxic waste disposal enter the environment, it has multiple effects on the organisms and ecosystems that live in or near those areas. Similarly to humans, animals have an increased risk of life-threatening health effects such as cancer, endocrine disruption, weakened immune system function, and reproductive issues. The California Condor is an example of a species directly impacted by lead from toxic waste disposal. Lead was directly linked to the excessive thinning of the Congo’s eggshells, negatively affecting its reproduction rates.

As organisms consume other organisms, toxins can be bioaccumulated. As plants or organisms at the bottom of the food chain accumulate toxins and are then consumed, the toxins are also ingested. These toxins can build up over time and through trophic levels. As a result of the bioaccumulation of mercury in both freshwater and marine ecosystems, predatory fish are a significant source of mercury in human and animal diets.

== Environmental Justice ==
Toxic waste often ends up in communities of color, Indigenous areas, and low-income neighborhoods due to a mix of historical injustice, economic exploitation, and political neglect. According to sociologist Robert Bullard, environmental racism is the root cause of marginalized communities facing a disproportionate share of environmental hazards. Bullard points out that "racial and ethnic inequality is perpetuated and reinforced by local governments in conjunction with urban-based corporations," which helps explain why these hazardous facilities are often placed in poorer areas where residents have less political power. These communities often lack the political power and resources to resist the placement of hazardous facilities. Industries target these areas because the land is cheaper and opposition is less organized. Redlining and segregation throughout history have concentrated more vulnerable populations in neglected areas, making them easy targets for the placement of mines, factories, and landfills. As a result, residents are vulnerable and have fewer options to relocate. Additionally, jobs or economic investments are sometimes offered as a justification for placing polluting industries in these marginalized communities. Bullard notes that this often means residents must accept dangerous working and living conditions just to keep their jobs or provide for their families. However, the short-term benefits don’t outweigh the long-term health risks, which include higher rates of asthma, cancer, and other illnesses.

Bullard also explains that government agencies and regulations often fail to enforce environmental protections equally. He states that “governments (including the military) have often exploited the economic vulnerability of poor communities and states to implement their unsound and risky operations”, allowing more pollution in areas that are already disadvantaged. This systemic inequality means that many residents suffer from the burden of pollution while not receiving the protections they deserve. Overall, Bullard’s work makes it clear that these environmental injustices are deeply connected to racial and economic inequalities embedded in our society.

== Current Initiatives ==
Current initiatives include the addition of legal frameworks like the Resource Conservation and Recovery Act (RCRA), which manages hazardous waste from creation to disposal, and the Comprehensive Environmental Response, Compensation, and Liability Act of 1980 (CERCLA), which addresses the cleanup of contaminated sites. In 2024, the Environmental Protection Agency (EPA) was working to regulate hazardous waste to protect public health and the environment through Federal programs like the Justice40 Initiative. The Justice40 Initiative is a federal program used to promote environmental equity by supporting vulnerable communities. According to Courtney Lindwall, a writer at Consumer Reports, one key aspect of the EPA’s efforts requires “that at least 40 percent of the overall benefits from federal climate and infrastructure investments go toward disinvested and overburdened communities,”. However, on January 20, 2025, the Trump Administration rescinded the Justice40 initiative.

== Toxic waste in the United States ==
In 2020, over 70 million people living in the United States resided within 3 miles of a hazardous waste facility. The demographics of the 22% of the population living within the vicinity of these sites were mainly minority and low-income. Specifically, the EPA found that 26% of all blacks in the US, 29% of all Hispanics, 28% of all minorities, and 24% of all households in the U.S. below the poverty level lived within 3 miles of hazardous waste sites.

Large corporations such as oil industry companies Shell and ExxonMobil, chemical and petroleum companies like Huntsman Corp and Dow Incorporated, mining and extraction companies like Freeport-McMoran and Southern Copper Corp, and other industries such as manufacturing, pharmaceutical, and electronic industries, all significantly contribute to toxic waste in the United States. The production processes of these companies lead to the generation of toxic waste through oil spills, emissions, and the release of chemicals into the environment. These companies often prioritize profits over environmental health. For example, several factories have been found to illegally dump pollutants like heavy metals and toxic chemicals, contaminating local communities and harming wildlife. These companies have political power because of their economic influence and resources. Due to this, they can dump illegally and cut corners despite regulations, highlighting the need for stricter regulation enforcement.

=== Cancer Alley ===
The emissions and toxic waste of over 200 fossil fuel and petrochemical industries in Louisiana have led to the pollution of “Cancer Alley”. This area stretches about 85 miles along the Mississippi River and affects thousands of people. The people living in this area are among those of the highest risk of cancer from air pollution in the US [34].Residents of “Cancer Alley” face numerous cases of miscarriages, reproductive health harms, and respiratory illnesses.

The Louisiana Department of Environmental Quality, as well as the EPA, has taken no action. However, there is a push for regulations and a shutdown of petroleum refineries. Journalist Antonia Juhasz, from the Human Rights Watch, states that “The fossil fuel and petrochemical industry has created a ‘sacrifice zone’ in Louisiana,”. Large oil industry companies like Shell have continued to pollute the community. Residents have had to fight back by taking legal action against Shell for the pollution that has made their lives unsafe. According to Robert Bullard, people from these communities have challenged corporations regarding environmental racism. These powerful companies target poor, mainly Black communities to dump harmful waste. Residents have brought lawsuits claiming that Shell’s pollution is causing health problems like asthma and cancer, but getting justice has been difficult because these companies often have the resources and influence to avoid accountability. Bullard explains that communities like Cancer Alley face huge obstacles when they try to hold polluters accountable because often the government doesn’t enforce environmental laws fairly or enough to protect these vulnerable groups.

=== Los Angeles ===
Off the coast of Los Angeles, there has been continued tracing of the toxic chemical dichlorodiphenyltrichloroethane (DDT), which was banned in 1972. This “forever chemical” is persistent within the environment and has a high potential for bioaccumulation. This chemical is very harmful to the environment, and exposure to humans and animals can lead to cancer and reproductive issues. Starting in 2011, DDT was found in ocean sediment. In 2021, there was further investigation by UC San Diego's Research Vessel that found barrels of acid waste that were dumped on the coast. After this research was completed, it was found that in the mid-1900s, the coast of Southern California was an approved toxic waste dumping site, approved for the dumping of military explosives and up to 3 million metric tons of petroleum waste. The DDT still present from these barrels has been studied to see if it has degraded through time, however, it is still in its most potent form. Looking into the future of Los Angeles, the EPA is conducting further research about the effects of these DDT chemicals on the ocean, humans, and wildlife. Additionally, more regulations on toxic waste dumping off the coast are in place; chemicals must now be dumped at least 150 miles off the coast.

=== Native Communities ===
Native communities in the United States have been disproportionately affected by toxic waste sites across the country. American journalist Daniel Brook states, “Because of the severe poverty and extraordinary vulnerability of Native American tribes, their lands have been targeted by the U.S. government and the large corporations as permanent areas for much of the poisonous industrial by-products of the dominant society,”. Native American communities have also been displaced as toxic waste disposal sites are located within dangerous ranges of their homes. For example, when these disposal sites are established near Native communities, they are exposing them to pollution. Water sources, soil, and air are all at risk of contamination. After the environment is contaminated, Native communities living there are continuously exposed to the harmful toxins from the waste or forced to relocate and move. As Winona LaDuke, a Native American activist, has pointed out, “We are proud people, but right now, our lands are being poisoned for profit,” emphasizing how this environmental damage deeply affects Native identities and traditions. To ass on, many times, the Native American land that is getting destroyed or contaminated is sacred again showing how it is impacting Native’s culture and way of life. Additionally, the contamination of Native land is disrupting their food systems, as crops, water, and livestock are impacted by chemicals leached into the environment.

=== History of US toxic waste regulation ===
The RCRA governs the generation, transportation, treatment, storage, and disposal of hazardous waste. The Toxic Substances Control Act (TSCA), also enacted in 1976, authorizes the EPA to collect information on all new and existing chemical substances, as well as to control any substances that were determined to cause unreasonable risk to public health or the environment. The Superfund law, passed in 1980, created a cleanup program for abandoned or uncontrolled hazardous waste sites.

There has been a long ongoing battle between communities and environmentalists versus governments and corporations about how strictly and how fairly the regulations and laws are written and enforced. That battle began in North Carolina in the late summer of 1979, as EPA's TSCA regulations were being implemented. In North Carolina, PCB-contaminated oil was deliberately dripped along rural Piedmont highways, creating the largest PCB spills in American history and a public health crisis that would have repercussions for generations to come. The PCB-contaminated material was eventually collected and buried in a landfill in Warren County, but citizens' opposition, including large public demonstrations, exposed the dangers of toxic waste, the fallibility of landfills than in use, and EPA regulations allowing landfills to be built on marginal, but politically acceptable sites.

Warren County citizens argued that the toxic waste landfill regulations were based on the fundamental assumption that the EPA's conceptual dry-tomb landfill would contain the toxic waste. This assumption informed the siting of toxic waste landfills and waivers to regulations that were included in EPA's Federal Register. For example, in 1978, the base of a major toxic waste landfill could be no closer than five feet from groundwater, but this regulation and others could be waived. The waiver to the regulation concerning the distance between the base of a toxic waste landfill and groundwater allowed the base to be only a foot above ground water if the owner/operator of the facility could demonstrate to the EPA regional administrator that a leachate collection system could be installed and that there would be no hydraulic connection between the base of the landfill and groundwater. Citizens argued that the waivers to the siting regulations were discriminatory mechanisms facilitating the shift from scientific to political considerations concerning the siting decision and that in the South this would mean a discriminatory proliferation of dangerous waste management facilities in poor black and other minority communities. They also argued that the scientific consensus was that permanent containment could not be assured. As resistance to the siting of the PCB landfill in Warren County continued and studies revealed that EPA dry-tomb landfills were failing, EPA stated in its Federal Register that all landfills would eventually leak and should only be used as a stopgap measure.

Years of research and empirical knowledge of the failures of the Warren County PCB landfill led citizens of Warren County to conclude that the EPA's dry-tomb landfill design and regulations governing the disposal of toxic and hazardous waste were not based on sound science and adequate technology. Warren County's citizens concluded also that North Carolina's 1981 Waste Management Act was scientifically and constitutionally unacceptable because it authorized the siting of toxic, hazardous, and nuclear waste facilities prior to public hearings, preempted local authority over the siting of the facilities, and authorized the use of force if needed.

In the aftermath of the Warren County protests, the 1984 Federal Hazardous and Solid Waste Amendments to the Resource Conservation and Recovery Act focused on waste minimization and phasing out land disposal of hazardous waste as well as corrective action for releases of hazardous materials. Other measures included in the 1984 amendments included increased enforcement authority for EPA, more stringent hazardous waste management standards, and a comprehensive underground storage tank program.

The disposal of toxic waste continues to be a source of conflict in the U.S. Due to the hazards associated with toxic waste handling and disposal, communities often resist the siting of toxic waste landfills and other waste management facilities; however, determining where and how to dispose of waste is a necessary part of economic and environmental policy-making.

The issue of handling toxic waste has become a global problem as international trade has arisen out of the increasing toxic byproducts produced with the transfer of them to less developed countries. In 1995, the United Nations Commission on Human Rights began to notice the illicit dumping of toxic waste and assigned a Special Rapporteur to examine the human rights aspect to this issue (Commission resolution 1995/81). In September 2011, the Human Rights Council decided to strengthen the mandate to include the entire life-cycle of hazardous products from manufacturing to the final destination (aka cradle to grave), as opposed to only movement and dumping of hazardous waste. The title of the Special Rapporteur has been changed to "Special Rapporteur on the implications for human rights of the environmentally sound management and disposal of hazardous substances and wastes" (Human Rights Council 18/11). The Human Rights Council has further extended the scope of its mandates as of September 2012 due to the result of the dangerous implications occurring to persons advocating environmentally sound practices regarding the generation, management, handling, distribution, and final disposal of hazardous and toxic materials to include the issue of the protection of the environmental human rights defenders.

=== Mapping of toxic waste in the United States ===
TOXMAP was a geographic information system (GIS) from the Division of Specialized Information Services of the United States National Library of Medicine (NLM) that used maps of the United States to help users visually explore data from the United States Environmental Protection Agency's (EPA) Superfund and Toxics Release Inventory programs. The chemical and environmental health information was taken from NLM's Toxicology Data Network (TOXNET) and PubMed, and from other authoritative sources.

== Examples of toxic waste issues globally ==
=== Toxic lead waste and disease in three Latin American countries ===
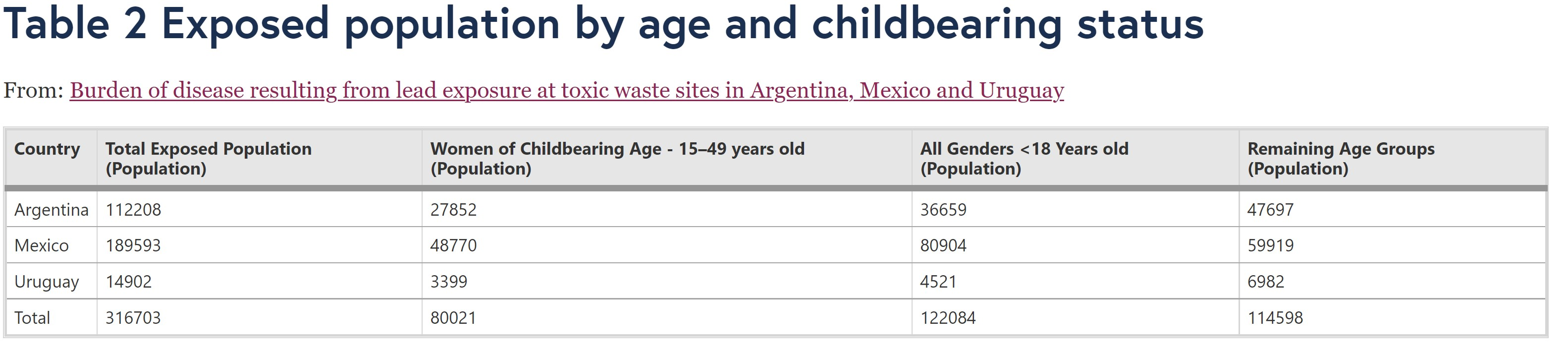
Of the exposed population, the proportion of women of childbearing age was relatively equal across the three countries.

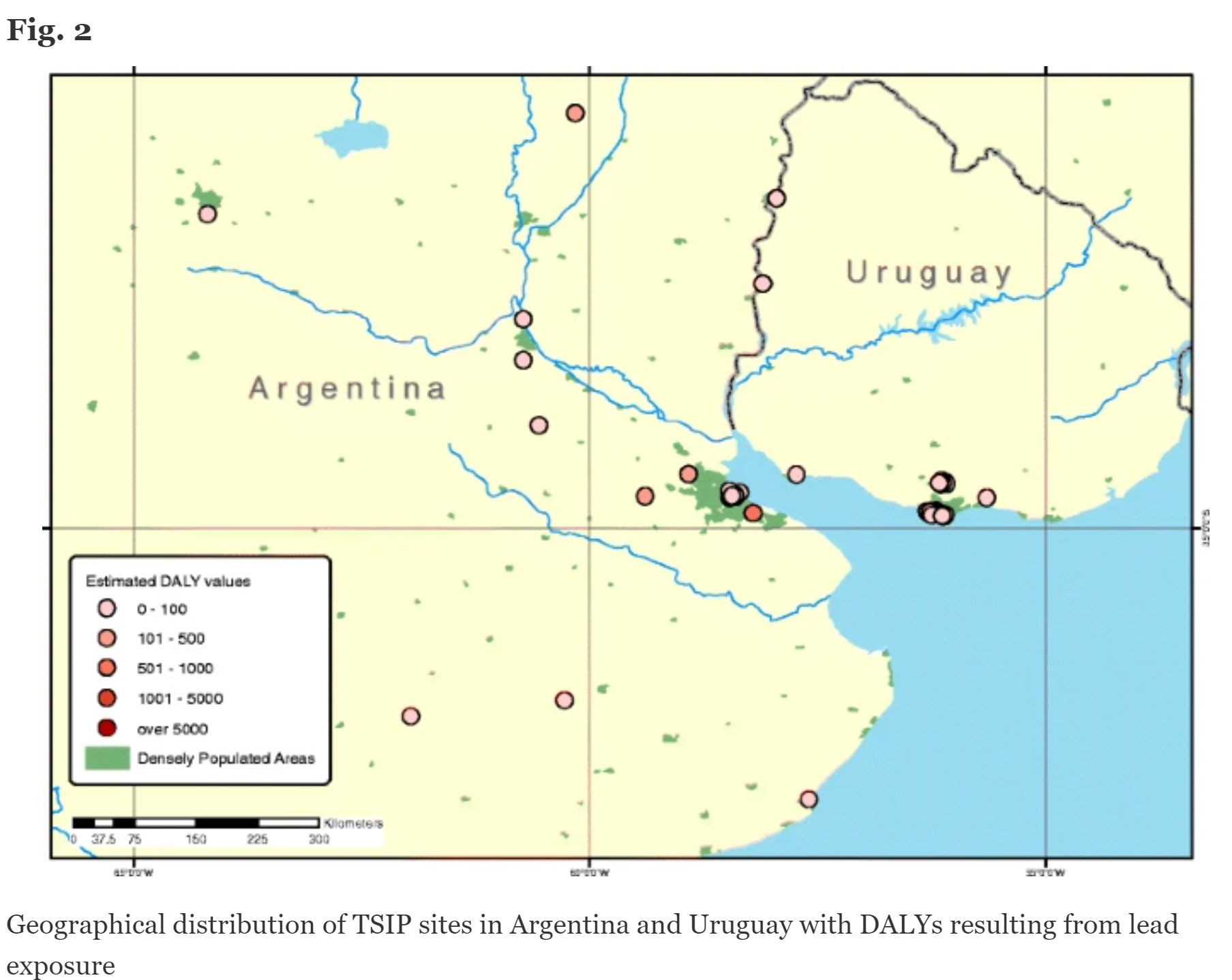
Geographical distribution of TSIP sites in Argentina and Uruguay with DALYs resulting from lead exposure

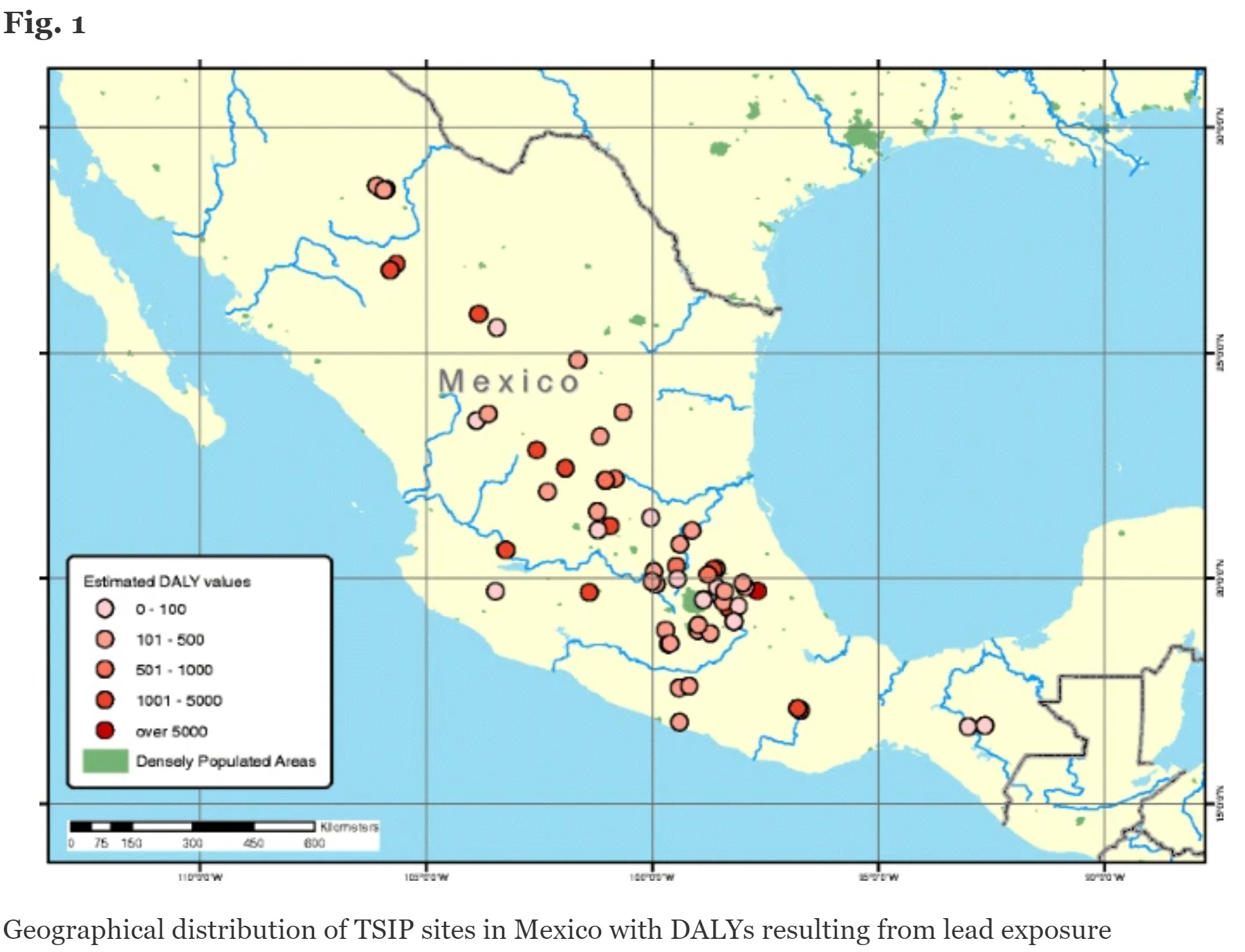
Geographical distribution of TSIP sites in Mexico with DALYs resulting from lead exposure

It can be seen that in Argentina, Mexico, and Uruguay there has been an increase in industrial development, urbanization, and socioeconomic forces. As these industries grow there is an underlying consequence of pollution that comes from environmental exposure to hazardous waste. When people are exposed to this pollution, they suffer negative health effects. With diseases on the rise, the disability-adjusted life year (DALY) starts to decline, so the time the average person lives decreases, especially in low to middle-income countries.

These low to middle-income countries (LMIC) have minimal resources to deal with toxic waste, such as "inadequate regulation, the informality of many industries, poor surveillance, and improper disposal of contaminants." For example, "lead is still used for glazing artisanal ceramics despite the availability of less hazardous alternatives." Lead enters the soil and water sources if not kept under control. Children are more susceptible than adults to absorbing more lead if exposed early on, causing them to have "behavioral problems in adolescence, IQ decrements, cognitive impairment, and decreased visuospatial skills." If adults are exposed occupationally, they can have higher rates of hypertension than the average person. Men can result in low sperm count and females can result in miscarriages.

In order to further quantify the burden of diseases caused by toxic wastes TSIP, Toxic Sites Identification Program, "identifies active and abandoned hazardous waste sites resulting from both formal and informal industrial activities in LMICs". As an investigation begins a key pollutant is sought out and identified. For example, researcher Jack Caravanos in a study on toxic waste sites in Argentina, Mexico and Uruguay, states that, "Heavy metals are the most commonly occurring key pollutant, with ingestion of contaminated soils being the most commonly occurring route of exposure listed in the TSIP database." Argentina, Mexico, and Uruguay were chosen since they had more available data after meeting certain criteria. As of now, there are five criteria that have to be met in order for a hazardous waste site to be included in the analysis; "a biological or environmental sample had to be present; a population at risk had to be specified; the location of the site was represented by GPS coordinates, and a description of the activities leading to contamination were outlined." To measure the amount of lead in the soil a handheld X-ray fluorescence (XRF) spectrometer was used. When this method seemed unavailable and an area was suspected of having to lead contamination, the blood of individuals was tested to show the amount the people who were exposed to lead.

The exposure data were collected from a total of 129 hazardous waste sites distributed across Argentina (n = 23), Mexico (n = 62), and Uruguay (n = 44). In Figs. 1 and 2 the sites of geographical distributions are shown. An estimated population of 316,703 individuals were at risk of exposure (mean = 2455; median = 250 per site), which is approximately 0.19% of the total population of all three countries. There was an estimation of 80,021 individuals who were women of childbearing age (15–49 years of age), and 122,084 individuals who were younger than 18 years of age.

=== Dioxins and Solid Waste Disposal in Campania, Italy ===
In recent years in the region of Campania, Italy there has been a rise in illegal dumping and burning of toxic and solid waste. In response to this, there has been a rise of dangerous chemical molecules like dioxins that are carcinogenic, which implies that they have the potential to cause cancer, that is appearing in humans and animals. For example, there has been a recent increase in sheep that have been born in contaminated areas that have. Cardiologist Alfredo Mazza states in a study about illegal dumpings that there was "higher rates of chromosome fragility, higher mortality, and a higher incidence of abnormal fetal development when compared with sheep raised in non-contaminated areas."

To assess the causal relations between cancer mortality and congenital malformations in humans coming from illegal dumping a map was drawn using the geographical locations of the sites.

As one can see most of these sites are located in Campania where Naples and Caserta are based.

The spread of dioxin through food consumption is primarily due to the animal products from the animals that were raised in the geographical locations where dioxins were the highest. Researchers tested mammalian milk from these areas and saw that the levels of dioxin were over the suggested amount. This was greatly seen as an issue because humans have the highest capability to concentrate the dioxin in their fat tissues. To test this, 94 women in Campania who were breastfeeding had samples of their breast milk tested and it was found that every woman had dioxin in their breast milk. A correlation was also discovered that the older you were the more dioxin was in your breast milk.

=== Toxic Waste in the Democratic Republic of the Congo ===
The Democratic Republic of Congo (DRC) is home to rich mineral resources, making the mining industry in the DRC worth trillions of dollars. Mining industries in the DRC continue to mine for critical minerals like cobalt and lithium for batteries that power electronic devices, vehicles, and even solar panels. As the demand for these products continues to grow, so does the need for these critical minerals. There has been continued extraction of these minerals; however, the mining practices are unsafe, and the expansion of these mines continues to take advantage of residents. Health system analyst Jonta Kamara and Stephanie Bumba from Think Global Health state that, “An estimated 500,000 to 2 million people in DRC rely on mining activities for employment. An estimated 40,000 child miners work in the country, reports indicating that some are as young as 7 years old. Adult miners are paid between $2.15 and $8.60 per day, but child miners make at most $2.50,”. In the DRC, working conditions are dangerous, and the workers are paid little to nothing as they put their lives at risk. Exposure to the toxic and radioactive chemicals within the mines leads to cancer and other respiratory effects that can negatively impact the workers' health. Furthermore, toxic dumping near the mines negatively impacts the surrounding environment, as chemicals can enter the soil and contaminate waterways.

Siddharth Kara, an American writer and author of the book Cobalt Red: How the Blood of the Congo Powers Our Lives, describes the working conditions of miners in the DRC. Kara describes that many miners work in "medieval" conditions, with no safety gear, risking poisoning, explosions, and deadly accidents every day. Kara states that these miners are "completely exposed to deadly chemicals and hazards without any safety precautions." Additionally, he emphasizes that many of these workers are children who are forced into dangerous labor and not given proper protection or fair wages.

=== Toxic Waste in Nigeria ===
Toxic waste dumping in Nigeria, especially in the Gulf of Guinea, is a major environmental issue. Western countries often send their harmful waste, disguised as old electronics, to poorer countries like Nigeria because they know that these nations do not have the proper systems in place to deal with such dangerous materials. According to environmental scholars Ifesinachi Okafor-Yarwood and Ibukun J. Adewumi, this practice is a form of environmental racism, as it disproportionately affects communities of color, exposing them to harmful chemicals and pollutants. In Nigeria, the illegal dumping of electronic waste has led to serious health problems, including cancer, respiratory diseases, and other chronic conditions among local populations. To tackle this issue, stronger international laws, such as the Basel and Bamako Conventions, need to be enforced. Additionally, Nigeria can work to improve waste management systems and inspect shipments more carefully to stop any further harm to the environment and people's health.

== Handling and disposal ==
One of the biggest problems with toxic material is how to dispose of it properly. In the United States, before the creation of the Environmental Protection Agency (EPA) in 1970, it was legal to dump such waste into streams, rivers, and oceans or bury it underground in landfills. The US Clean Water Act, enacted in 1972, and the Resource Conservation and Recovery Act, enacted in 1976, created nationwide programs to regulate the handling and disposal of hazardous wastes.

The agriculture industry uses over 800,000 tons of pesticides worldwide annually that contaminate soils, and eventually infiltrate into groundwater, which can contaminate drinking water supplies. The oceans can be polluted from the stormwater runoff of these chemicals as well. Toxic waste in the form of petroleum oil can either spill into the oceans from pipe leaks or large ships, but it can also enter the oceans from everyday citizens dumping car oil into the rainstorm sewer systems. Disposal is the placement of waste into or on the land. Disposal facilities are usually designed to permanently contain waste and prevent the release of harmful pollutants to the environment.

The most common hazardous waste disposal practice is placement in a land disposal unit such as a landfill, surface impoundment, waste pile, land treatment unit, or injection well. Land disposal is subject to requirements under EPA's Land Disposal Restrictions Program. Injection wells are regulated under the federal Underground Injection Control program.

Organic wastes can be destroyed by incineration at high temperatures. However, if the waste contains heavy metals or radioactive isotopes, these must be separated and stored, as they cannot be destroyed. The method of storage will seek to immobilize the toxic components of the waste, possibly through storage in sealed containers, inclusion in a stable medium such as glass or a cement mixture, or burial under an impermeable clay cap. Waste transporters and waste facilities may charge fees; consequently, improper methods of disposal may be used to avoid paying these fees. Where the handling of toxic waste is regulated, the improper disposal of toxic waste may be punishable by fines or prison terms. Burial sites for toxic waste and other contaminated brownfield land may eventually be used as greenspace or redeveloped for commercial or industrial use.

== In popular culture ==
"Toxic waste" is often utilized in science fiction as a plot device that causes organisms or characters to undergo mutation. Examples of works that feature toxic waste in such a manner include the films Mutant, C.H.U.D., Impulse (all 1984), and Teenage Mutant Ninja Turtles (1990). Several films produced by Troma Entertainment involve mutation via toxic or radioactive waste, including The Toxic Avenger (1984) and Class of Nuke 'Em High (1986).

== See also ==
- Agent Orange
- Environmental dumping
- Environmental remediation
- Pollution
- Red mud, a caustic byproduct of alumina production
