= Nutbush =

Nutbush may refer to:

- Nutbush, Tennessee, a community in Haywood County, childhood home of singer Tina Turner
- Nutbush Township, Warren County, North Carolina, one of twelve townships in Warren County, North Carolina
- Nutbush, Memphis, a district of Memphis, Tennessee
- "Nutbush City Limits", a song about Nutbush, Tennessee by singer Tina Turner
  - The Nutbush, a dance categorized as a Line dance, performed to the song Nutbush City Limits
