= Warren County PCB Landfill =

In North Carolina, US

Coordinates: 36.3523°N 78.1582°W

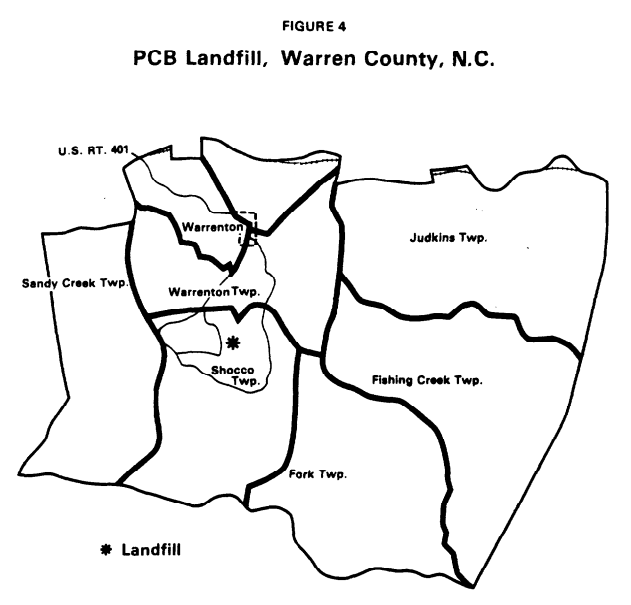
Map of Warren County from a 1983 United States General Accounting Office report, asterisk denotes PCB landfill site

Warren County PCB Landfill was a PCB landfill located in Warren County, North Carolina, near the community of Afton south of Warrenton. The landfill was created in 1982 by the State of North Carolina as a place to dump soil contaminated by an illegal PCB dumping incident. The site, which is about 150 acres (0.61 km^{2}), was extremely controversial and led to years of lawsuits. Warren County was one of the first cases of environmental justice in the United States and set a legal precedent for other environmental justice cases. The landfill was fully decontaminated by 2004, after the State of North Carolina paid millions to clean it up over the course of many years. The site was approximately three miles south of Warrenton. The State of North Carolina owned about 19 acres (77,000 m^{2}) of the tract where the landfill was located, and Warren County owned the surrounding acreage around the borders.

== Background ==
In 1976, the United States Congress passed the Toxic Substances Control Act, which banned the production of polychlorinated biphenyls, or PCBs, effective January 1978 and regulated their disposal. In April the United States Environmental Protection Agency promulgated new regulations governing the disposal of various chemicals, including PCBs. The rules required that they be destroyed or stored in approved landfills.

In 1978, Robert Ward of the Ward Transformer Company of Raleigh, North Carolina contracted Robert Burns and his two sons of Transformer Sales of Allegany, New York to dispose of large quantities of PCBs. Originally, Ward had Burns oversee the shipment of PCB-contaminated oil to a warehouse in Pennsylvania for storage. When they determined this was too expensive, they conspired to illegally dump the rest of the fluid in remote locations. To achieve this, employees of the Ward Transformer Company modified a 750-gallon tanker truck with a nozzle to allow it to spray fluids from its tank while it drove. In June 1978 two truckloads of PCB-contaminated oil were sprayed on Fort Bragg land. After the sandy soil at Bragg proved unsuitable for driving the truck and absorbing the fluid, Ward and Burns resolved to dispose of the rest of it in other rural areas.

Through July and August, Burns and his sons dumped approximately 12,850 gallons of PCB-tainted fluid at 51 locations across 210 miles of roadway in 14 different North Carolina counties. Contamination was first noticed at Fort Bragg, where discolored grass and soil were observed along 11 miles of roadway. On July 31, authorities in Warren County noticed oil alongside North Carolina Highway 58 outside of the town of Warrenton. Of the counties impacted by the dumping of the waste, Warren was the most affected. The county commission passed an ordinance the following month banning the disposal of PCBs in its jurisdiction. Subsequent testing by state authorities of the fluid discovered the presence of PCBs, and a criminal investigation tied the dumping to the Ward Transformer Company and Transformer Sales. Burns confessed to his role in the scheme and was arrested, while Ward was indicted by a federal grand jury and eventually convicted for eight counts of illegal disposal of PCBs in 1981.

Officials recovered 400,000 cubic yards of contaminated soil from the dumping sites. In total, $2.4 million in Superfund money was expended, as well as $430,000 from the U.S. Army at Fort Bragg and $450,000 from the state of North Carolina. In January 1982 the federal government sued the Ward Transformer Company for recovery of the cleanup costs. The state of North Carolina later joined as another party, and in 1985 the case was settled with the court determining the company liable for the cleanup.

== Landfill ==
Having collected the contaminated soil, the state of North Carolina sought legal avenues for disposal. As the nearest approved landfill for PCBs was in Alabama, officials decided to build one within North Carolina. The government evaluated 90 potential sites before narrowing down their choices to two: a section of the Chatham County sanitary landfill, and a farm owned by Carter and Linda Pope near the community of Afton in Warren County. After local residents pressured the Chatham County board of commissioners to withdraw their offer of the landfill site, on December 12, 1978 state officials requested a permit from the EPA to build a landfill on the Pope property. With the Popes facing bankruptcy, the state was able to acquire the 142.3-acre tract cheaply and quickly. Feeling pressure to act expeditiously and keep costs down, officials requested a waiver of three requirements then in place for such a facility's construction: a specified distance from groundwater, the presence of a leachate collection system, and the presence of an artificial liner.

The announcement of the state's application of a permit for the construction of a PCB landfill in Warren County worried and angered local residents, who feared it would poison natural resources and damage the area's economy. A group eventually totaling over 400 members, Warren County Citizens Concerned about PCBs, was formed to protest the landfill.

== Controversy ==
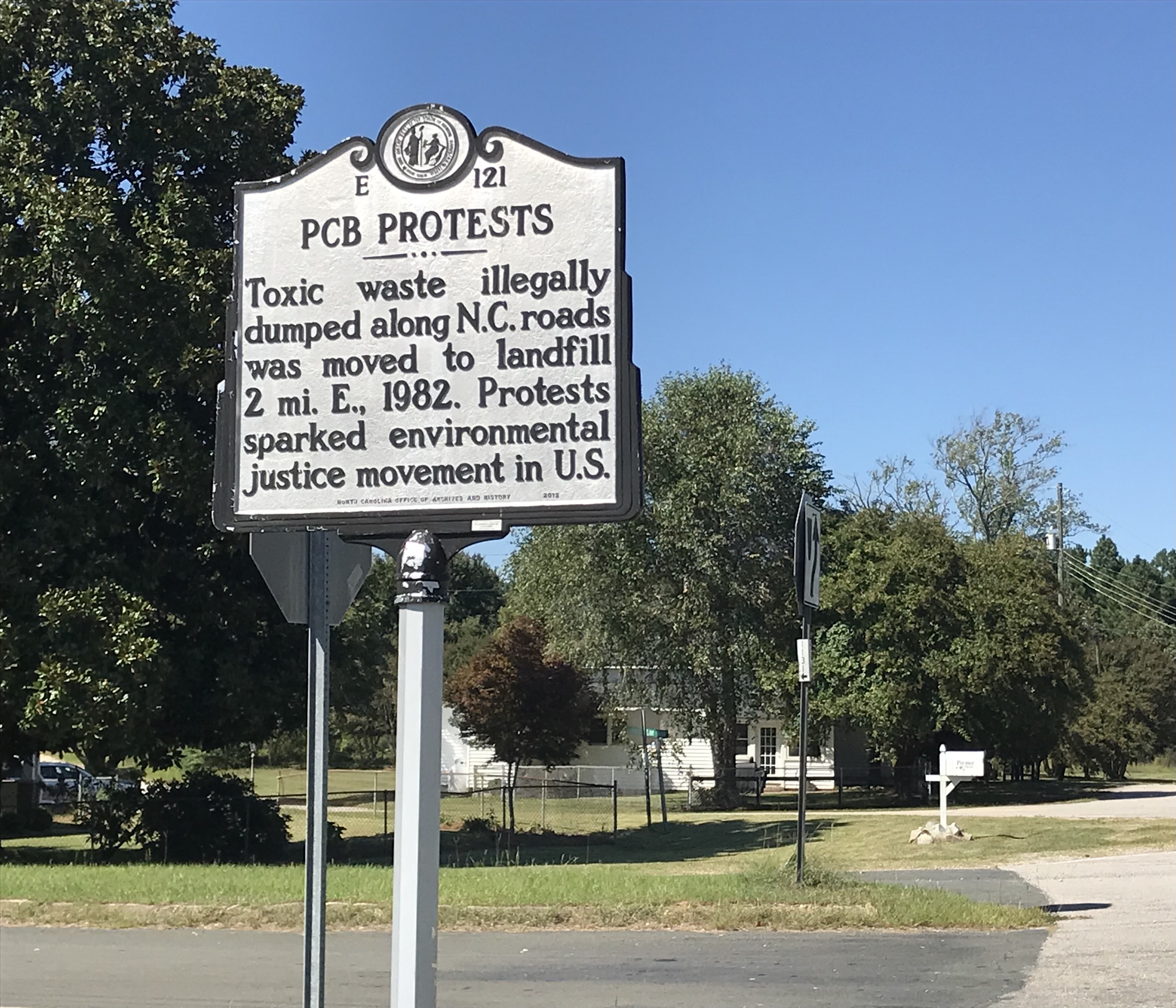
Highway marker in Afton commemorating landfill protests

Beginning with Governor Hunt's administration's December 20, 1978 announcement that "public sentiment would not deter the state from burying the PCBs in Warren County," the PCB landfill was surrounded by controversy. The landfill was located in rural Warren County, which was primarily African American. Warren County has about 18,000 residents. Sixty-nine percent of the residents are non-white, and twenty percent live below the federal poverty level. The county has been classified a Tier I county for economic development. Although a coalition of residents lost the battle to stop the landfill, the protesters obtained numerous concessions from the state over the years. The state claimed that the Warren County site was the best available site; however, the site selection process was not based on scientific criteria — soil permeability properties or the distance to groundwater — but on other, less tangible criteria, including the demographics of the county. EPA and state officials claimed the design of landfill would compensate for improper soil qualities and the close proximity to groundwater, calling it a "state-of-the-art", "dry-tomb", zero-percent discharge landfill.

An article from 1996 said, “North Carolina’s PCB landfill in Warren County leaks about a half an inch of water a year”. State data on rainfall during 1996 and water levels inside the dump indicate 30,000 gallons of water flow into the site each year and 26,000 gallons flow out. During this time, citizens urged Governor Hunt to clean up the dump and detoxify the PCB contaminated soil.

After four years, Warren County citizens officially launched the environmental justice movement as they lay in front of 10,000 truckloads of contaminated PCB soil. During the six-week trucking opposition, with collective nonviolent direct action, which included over 550 arrests, Warren County citizens mounted what the Duke Chronicle described as "the largest civil disobedience in the South since Dr. Martin Luther King Jr., marched through Alabama." It was the first time in American history that citizens were jailed for trying to stop a landfill, from attempting to prevent pollution. In an editorial titled "Dumping on the Poor," The Washington Post described Warren County's PCB protest movement as "the marriage of environmentalism with civil rights," and in its 1994 Environmental Equity Draft, the EPA described the PCB protest movement as "the watershed event that led to the environmental equity movement of the 1980's." With public pressure mounting, Governor Hunt pledged to Warren citizens that when technology became available, the state would detoxify the PCB landfill. The resulting controversy led to the coining of the phrase "environmental racism" and galvanized the environmental justice movement.

Soon after, academics and scholars began researching the link between poverty and minority neighborhoods across the country and higher levels of environmental hazards. The Warren County protest led the commission of racial justice to produce "Toxic Waste and Race", the first national study to correlate waste facilities sites and demographic characteristics. Race was found to be the most significant variable in predicting where these facilities were located; more powerful than poverty, land values, and home ownership.

== Decontamination ==
In May 1993, more than 10 years after the Governor promised to detoxify the landfill when it became feasible, and soon after stopping a huge trash landfill to be located near the PCB landfill, citizens learned that there was "an emergency" at the PCB landfill. Nearly a million gallons of water in the landfill threatened to breach the liner. Speaking and negotiating for Warren County citizens as he had done a decade before, Ken Ferruccio laid out a 5-Point Framework for resolving the PCB landfill crisis and demanded from the Hunt administration (Governor Jim Hunt's 3rd of 4 terms in office):

- The state continue to monitor and maintain the PCB landfill
- A joint citizen/state committee be formed to mutually address the failures of the PCB landfill
- The solution to the failed PCB landfill remain on site
- Citizens be given independent scientific representation
- Permanent detoxification of the PCB landfill be the ultimate goal

Governor Hunt agreed to the Framework and the Joint Warren County/State PCB Landfill Working Group was formed.

In 1999, the North Carolina General Assembly promised about eight million dollars to go towards cleanup with another group would be willing to match it. The EPA was deemed a "match" and the cleanup project was able to move forward. In November 2000 an environmental engineering firm, Earth Tech, was hired to serve as the oversight contractor.

In December 2000, public bids were taken for the site-detoxifying contract. The IT Corporation was awarded the contract, with their bid of 13.5 million dollars. Phase I of the cleanup process began, and the contract was signed in March 2001. The IT Corporation was bought by the Shaw Group in May 2002 and changed their name to Shaw Environmental and Infrastructure. The equipment was sent to the landfill in May 2002, and an open house was held so community members could view the site before the start-up.

The follow-up tests on the site were performed in 2002. The EPA demonstrated test onto the PCB Landfill in January 2003. Based on the test results, an interim operations permit was granted in March. The soil treatment was then completed in October 2003, and in total 81,600 tons of soil was treated for the landfill site. The soil which was treated was the soil that was on the roadside and the soil adjacent to it that had been in the landfill and had been cross-contaminated. The equipment at the site was decontaminated and removed from the site at the end of 2003. The final cost of the cleanup project of the landfill was 17.1 million dollars. The Based Catalyzed Decomposition detoxification was completed in 2004. Decades after the initial incident the state of North Carolina was required to spend over $25 million to clean up and detoxify the Warren County PCBs landfill.

== See also ==
- Landfill in the United States
- Environmental justice
- Environmental racism

== Works cited ==
- McGurty, Eileen Maura (July 1997). "From NIMBY to Civil Rights: The Origins of the Environmental Justice Movement". Environmental History. 2 (3): 301–323. JSTOR 3985352.
- Taylor, Dorceta (2014). Toxic Communities: Environmental Racism, Industrial Pollution, and Residential Mobility. NYU Press. ISBN 9781479861620.
