= Green Duke House =

Historic house in North Carolina, United States

- U.S. National Register of Historic Places
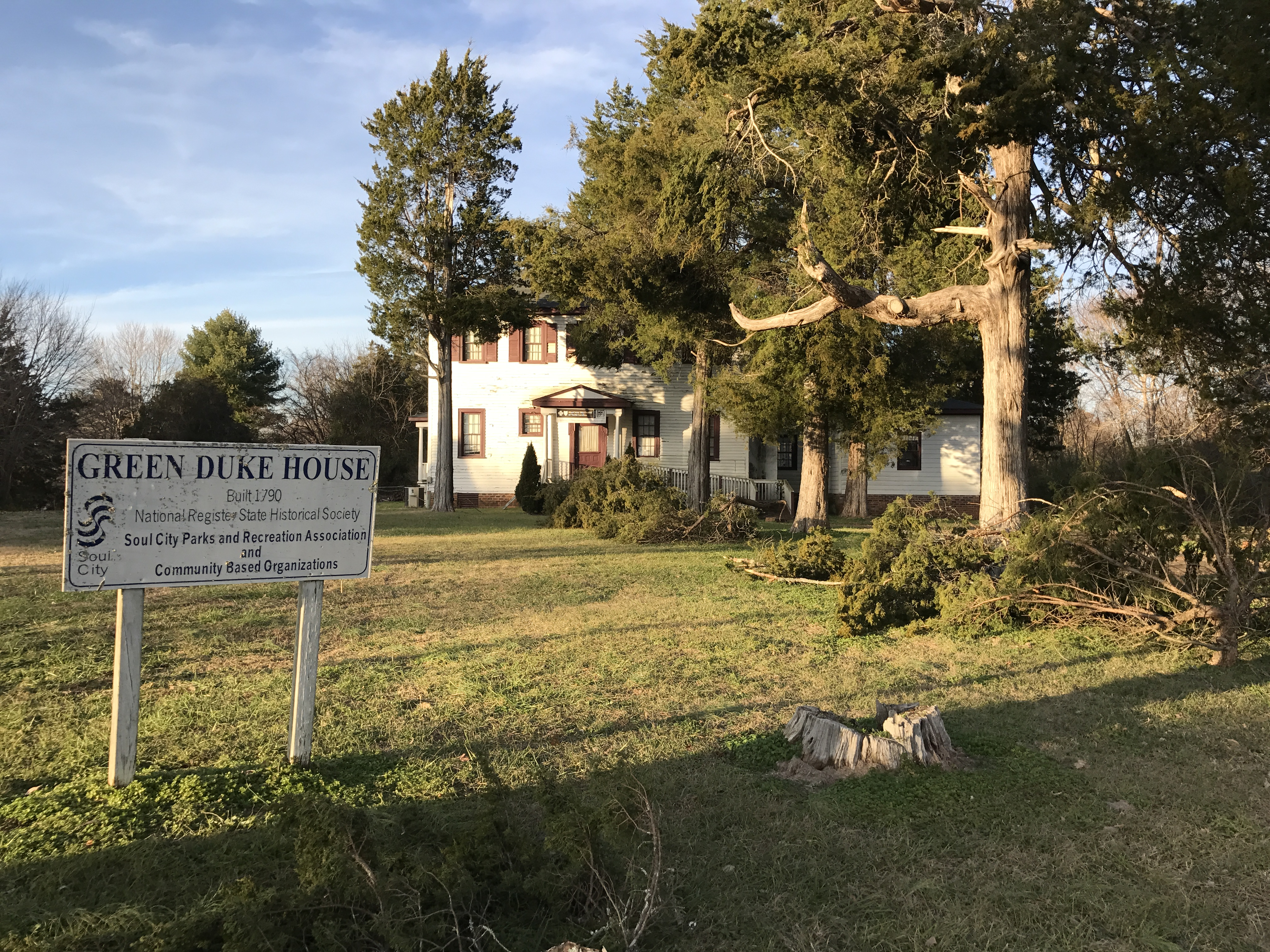

- Location within North Carolina Location within the United States
- Location: SE of Manson off SR 1100, Soul City, near Manson, North Carolina
- Coordinates: 36°24′52″N 78°13′51″W
- Area: 3 acres (1.2 ha)
- Built: c.1800, c. 1900
- Architectural style: Georgian, post-Victorian
- NRHP reference No.: 74001383
- Added to NRHP: August 7, 1974

Green Duke House is a historic plantation house located at Soul City, near Manson, Warren County, North Carolina. It was built about 1800 as a Georgian style dwelling, and remodeled in the post-Victorian style about 1900. It is a two-story, five-bay, frame dwelling with a hipped roof. The front and rear facades feature one-story porches with elaborate Ionic order columns. At the time of its listing, the house was being used as a day care center.

Duke was the surname of an early landowner, and Green the maiden name of his wife. The house was listed on the National Register of Historic Places in 1974.
