= T. T. Clayton =

American attorney (1930 – 2019)

Theaoseus Theaboyd Clayton Sr. (October 2, 1930 – April 4, 2019) was an American attorney.

== Early life ==
Theaoseus Theaboyd Clayton was born on October 2, 1930, on his parents' farm in Person County, North Carolina, U.S. His parents, Addie Thomas Clayton and Monroe Clayton Jr., farmed tobacco, corn and wheat. Clayton spent a significant amount of his time in his youth working on the farm. When he was 18 years of age, he enrolled in Johnson C. Smith University, an all-black college in Charlotte. From 1952 to 1954 he served in the U.S. Army as a military police officer and, when deployed in Korea, as a postal supervisor. Following his service he returned to Smith University to complete his studies, graduating in 1955 with a bachelor's degree in general science and political science. On December 24, he married Eva McPherson, woman he had met during their senior year at the school. He had four children with her. He earned a law degree from North Carolina College in 1961.

== Career ==
In August 1961, Clayton joined the McKissick and Berry Law Firm in Durham. In October, he partnered with a white attorney, James D. Gilliland, to form the firm of Gillian and Clayton in Warrenton. Clayton was the first black person to practice law in Warren County. Interracial legal partnerships were unusual at the time, but Gillian was unable to partner with other white lawyers due to his history of representing people accused of communist sympathies. Clayton practiced independently after Gillian died. During his time in Warrenton, Clayton oversaw transactions of land, and represented black civil rights activists who sought to integrate a local theatre and the county school system.

Clayton made unsuccessful bids for a seat to the North Carolina House of Representatives in 1964, 1966, and 1970. In 1968, civil rights activist Vernon Jordan, as part of his efforts to increase black political engagement, met with Clayton to recruit a black candidate in the region. Eventually, the two decided that Clayton's wife was the best choice, and later that year Eva unsuccessfully challenged incumbent Lawrence H. Fountain in North Carolina's 2nd congressional district for his seat in the U.S. House of Representatives.

Shortly thereafter, civil rights activist Floyd McKissick, Clayton's erstwhile legal colleague, entrusted him with discreetly searching for land in North Carolina which could be purchased to create a new planned city to economically benefit black people. After viewing a site in Halifax County which McKissick deemed unsuitable, Clayton secured rights to a large property in Warren County from which McKissick would develop a community, Soul City. He then served as general counsel for the development project. In October 1973, Governor James Holshouser appointed him to the State Board of Youth Development. Clayton shuttered his Warrenton law practice in 2005 but continued practicing law in Raleigh until 2013.

== Later life ==
Clayton died on April 4, 2019, at the age of 88 years.

== Works cited ==
- Healy, Thomas (2021). Soul City: Race, Equality, and the Lost Dream of an American Utopia. New York City: Metropolitan Books. ISBN 9781627798624.
- McKinney, Charles Wesley (2010). Greater Freedom: The Evolution of the Civil Rights Struggle in Wilson, North Carolina. University Press of America. ISBN 9780761852308.
