= Eva Clayton =

American politician (born 1934)

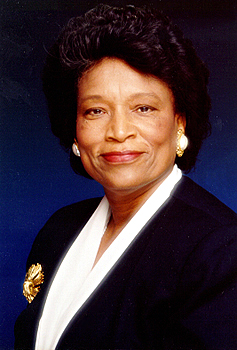

Member of the U.S. House of Representatives from North Carolina's 1st district
- In office November 3, 1992 – January 3, 2003 (Note: Clayton's official service begins on the date of the special election, while the House was adjourned sine die until the start of the next Congress on January 3, 1993.)
- Preceded by: Walter Jones
- Succeeded by: Frank Ballance

Personal details
- Born: Eva McPherson; September 16, 1934 (age 92) Savannah, Georgia, U.S.
- Party: Democratic
- Spouse: T. T. Clayton (died 2019)
- Education: Johnson C. Smith University (BS); North Carolina Central University (MS); University of North Carolina, Chapel Hill

Eva Clayton (née McPherson; born September 16, 1934) is an American politician from North Carolina. On taking her seat in the United States House of Representatives following a special election in 1992, Clayton became the first African American to represent North Carolina in the House since George Henry White was elected to his second and last term in 1898. She was re-elected and served for five terms. In 2003, Clayton was appointed Assistant Director-General of the United Nations's Food and Agriculture Organization (FAO), based in Rome.

== Early life and education ==
Eva McPherson was born in Savannah, Georgia to Thomas McPherson, an insurance agent, and Josephine Martin, a teacher. Clayton graduated with a Bachelor of Science degree in biology from Johnson C. Smith University in Charlotte, North Carolina in 1955. In 1956, she married Theaoseus Clayton, also a graduate of Johnson C. Smith University.

Eva and Theaoseus Clayton both pursued graduate degrees at North Carolina Central University following their marriage. Eva graduated with a Master of Science degree from the Durham, North Carolina school in 1962.

The Claytons moved to Warrenton, North Carolina, where Theaoseus established himself as a lawyer. Eva attended law school at the University of North Carolina at Chapel Hill.

== Career ==
In 1968, civil rights activist Vernon Jordan, as part of his efforts to increase black political engagement, met with Theaoseus Clayton to recruit a black candidate for public officer in eastern North Carolina. Eventually, the two decided that Eva was the best choice, and later that year she unsuccessfully challenged incumbent Lawrence H. Fountain in North Carolina's 2nd congressional district for his seat in the U.S. House of Representatives.

Clayton worked on the Soul City community development project in Warren County, North Carolina. In 1977, she was appointed Assistant Secretary for Community Development for the North Carolina State Department of Natural Resources and Community Development and served from 1977 to 1981.

From 1982 to 1992, Clayton served as an elected member and chair of the Warren County Board of Commissioners. In 1992, she was elected from the 1st congressional district in North Carolina to the United States House of Representatives as a Democrat; at the same time she won a special election to finish the remaining months in 1992 of the term of Congressman Walter B. Jones Sr.

North Carolina had amended its constitution in 1899 to disfranchise Blacks, as did most southern states from 1890 to 1908, and no Black candidates were elected to Congress in the succeeding 92 years. When Representative Walter Jones Sr., announced his retirement in 1992, Clayton entered the Democratic primary to fill his seat. Recently reapportioned by the state legislature, the congressional district was one of two in North Carolina that had a black majority In 1992. Clayton and Mel Watt became the first African Americans to win election to the House from North Carolina since 1898. (As Clayton won a special election, she took office before Watt). Watt's 12th congressional district was one of two minority majority districts developed in the 1990s, in order to give the substantial minority of African Americans in the state the ability to elect candidates of their choice, in compliance with the Voting Rights Act of 1965.

Clayton gained national attention as president of her Democratic freshman class in Congress. During her ten years of distinguished service as a United States Congresswoman, Clayton served on the House Agriculture Committee and as the ranking member of the United States Department of Agriculture's Operations Oversight, Nutrition, and Forestry Subcommittees. She also served on the House Budget and Small Business Committees. She was actively engaged in the legislative development of the Department of Agriculture's Operation policy. She was a conferee on the 2002 Farm Bill and is recognized by national organizations, including the National Journal publications, for providing essential leadership by garnering support for nutritional programs and the civil rights and support for African American farmers in the final version of the Farm Bill. She provided additional leadership by serving as the bipartisan co-chair of the Rural Caucus and as the chair of the Congressional Black Caucus Foundation.

Clayton and other members of the House of Representatives objected to counting the 25 electoral votes from Florida which George W. Bush narrowly won after a contentious recount. Because no senator joined her objection, the objection was dismissed by Vice President Al Gore, who was Bush's opponent in the 2000 presidential election. Without Florida's electoral votes, the election would have been decided by the U.S. House of Representatives, with each state having one vote in accordance with the Twelfth Amendment to the United States Constitution.

In 2003, Clayton was appointed Assistant Director-General and Special Adviser to the Director-General on World Food Summit Follow-up with the Food Agriculture Organization (FAO) of the United Nations in Rome, Italy. She served in that capacity for three years, in which she was responsible for encouraging the establishment of global alliances and partnerships to fight hunger and poverty in twenty-four countries, including the United States, Brazil, Ghana, and Jordan. Clayton remains a strong advocate for the hungry and the poor and she continuously promotes sustainable agriculture and equality in this country and around the world.

Clayton is currently a consultant and founder of Eva Clayton Associates International (ECAI), which describes itself as "a multidisciplined consulting firm actively engaged in several governmental practice areas".

She is the recipient of eight honorary doctorate degrees and an active member of Alpha Kappa Alpha sorority. Clayton is an Elder at Cotton Memorial Presbyterian Church in Henderson, North Carolina. She serves on several boards that address hunger, agriculture and state policy issues, including the United States Alliance to End Hunger, the Global Food Banking Network, and the Center for Environmental Farming Systems.

In November 2022, North Carolina Governor Roy Cooper awarded Clayton the 2022 North Carolina Award, the highest civilian honor given by the state.

Her husband Theaoseus T. Clayton Sr., Esq., died in 2019 at age 88. They have four children and six grandchildren.

== See also ==
- List of African-American United States representatives
- Women in the United States House of Representatives

== Works cited ==
- Healy, Thomas (2021). Soul City: Race, Equality, and the Lost Dream of an American Utopia. New York City: Metropolitan Books. ISBN 9781627798624.
- McKinney, Charles Wesley (2010). Greater Freedom: The Evolution of the Civil Rights Struggle in Wilson, North Carolina. University Press of America. ISBN 9780761852308.

U.S. House of Representatives
Preceded by Walter Jones	Member of the U.S. House of Representatives from North Carolina's 1st congressional district 1992–2003	Succeeded by Frank Ballance
U.S. order of precedence (ceremonial)
Preceded by Sean Patrick Maloney as Former U.S. Representative	Order of precedence of the United States as Former U.S. Representative	Succeeded by Robin Hayes as Former U.S. Representative
