= Walter B. Jones Sr. =

American politician (1913–1992)

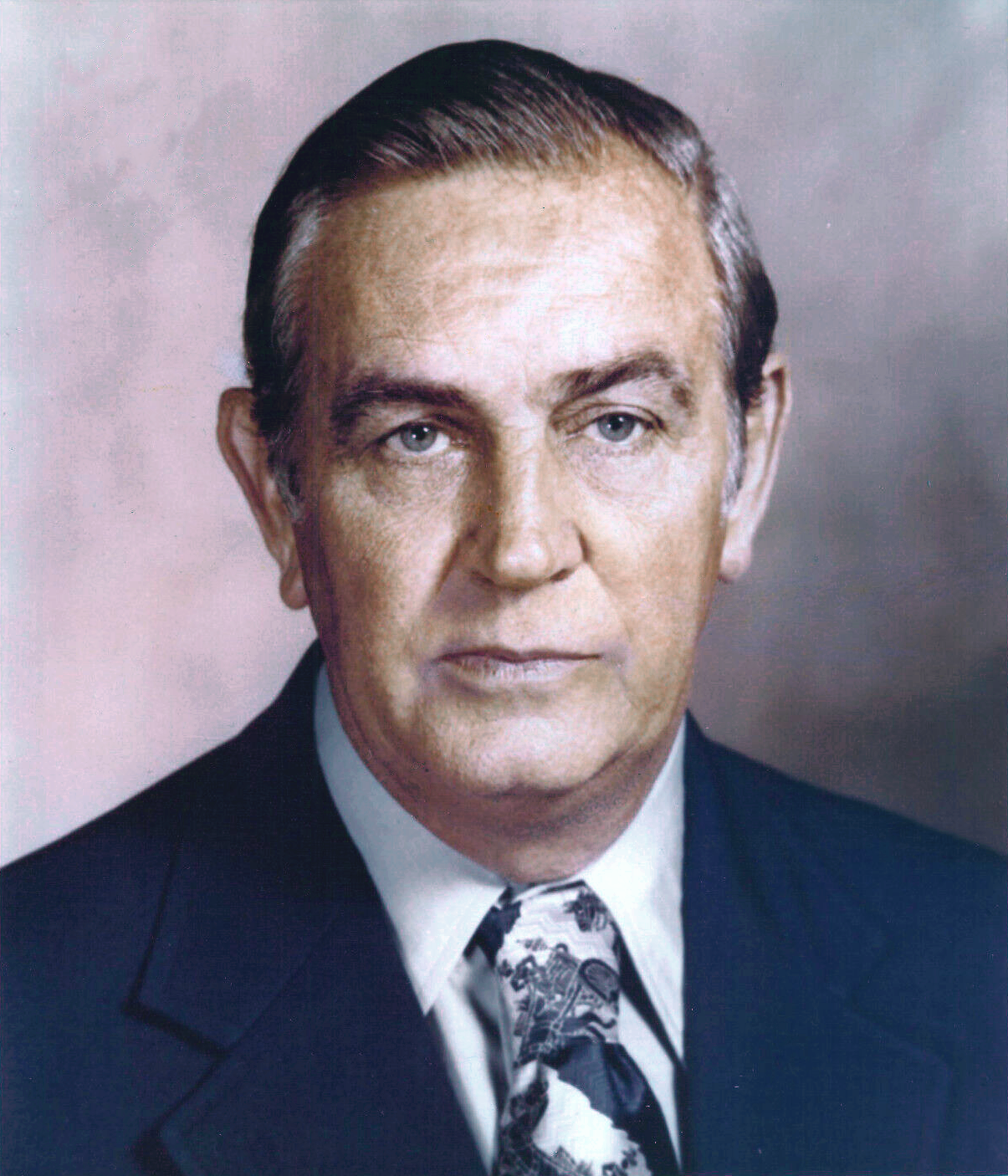

Member of the U.S. House of Representatives from North Carolina's 1st district
- In office February 5, 1966 – September 15, 1992
- Preceded by: Herbert C. Bonner
- Succeeded by: Eva Clayton

Member of the North Carolina Senate from the 6th district
- In office 1965–1966
- Succeeded by: Albert J. Ellis

Member of the North Carolina House of Representatives from Pitt County
- In office 1955–1959
- Preceded by: Frank M. Kilpatrick
- Succeeded by: Clifton Everett

Personal details
- Born: Walter Beaman Jones; August 19, 1913 Fayetteville, North Carolina, U.S.
- Died: September 15, 1992 (aged 79) Norfolk, Virginia, U.S.
- Party: Democratic
- Children: Include Walter Jr.
- Education: North Carolina State University

Walter Beaman Jones Sr. (August 19, 1913 – September 15, 1992), was an American Democratic politician from the state of North Carolina who served in the United States House of Representatives from 1966 until his death from natural causes in Norfolk, Virginia, in 1992.

== Early life and education ==
Jones was born in Fayetteville, North Carolina, and attended Elise Academy, in Hemp, North Carolina. He received a Bachelor of Science in 1934 from North Carolina State University in Raleigh.

== Career ==
Jones became a businessman. Soon after graduation he married and started a family.

After getting established in local life, Jones was elected as mayor of Farmville from 1949 to 1953. He was elected to the North Carolina General Assembly from 1955 to 1959, and to the North Carolina State Senate in 1965.

Jones was elected as a Democrat to the 89th United States Congress by special election to fill the vacancy caused by the death of Representative Herbert C. Bonner. He was reelected to the 90th, 91st, 92nd, 93rd, 94th, 95th, 96th, 97th, 98th, 99th, 100th, 101st, and 102nd United States Congresses, serving from February 5, 1966 to September 15, 1992. He was the chairman of the Committee on Merchant Marine and Fisheries from the 97th through 102nd Congresses.

He died in Norfolk, Virginia. His son Walter B. Jones Jr. served as a Republican congressman in North Carolina from 1995 to 2019. Walter Sr. is buried in Forest Hills Cemetery in Farmville, North Carolina.

== See also ==
- List of members of the United States Congress who died in office (1950–1999)

U.S. House of Representatives
Preceded by Herbert Covington Bonner	Member of the U.S. House of Representatives from North Carolina's 1st congressional district 1966–1992	Succeeded by Eva M. Clayton
Political offices
Preceded by Thomas W. L. Ashley; Ohio	Chairman of House Merchant Marine and Fisheries Committee; 1981–1992	Succeeded by Gerry Studds; Massachusetts
