= Manson, North Carolina =

- Unincorporated community
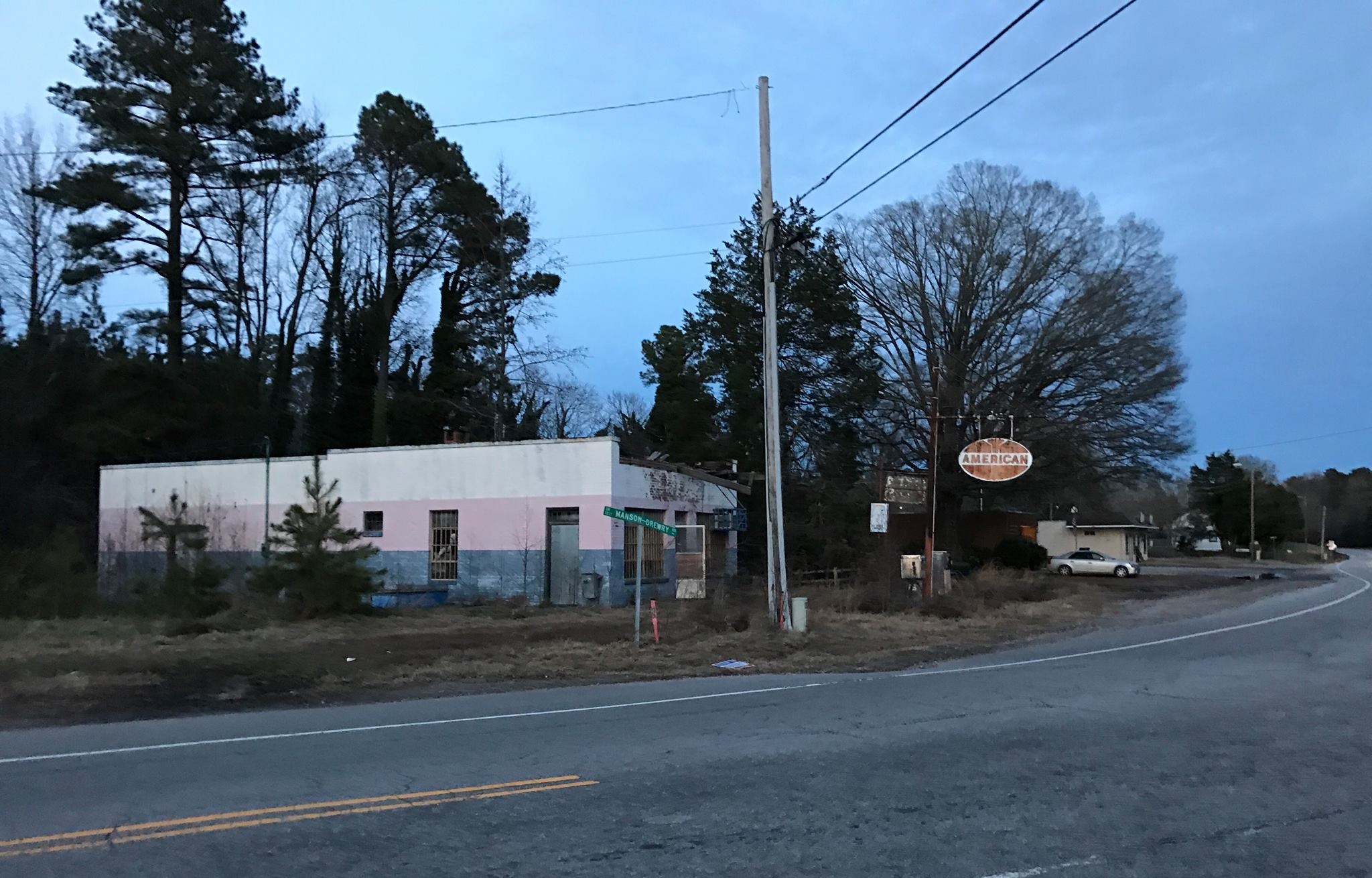

- Location within North Carolina Location within the United States
- Coordinates: 36°25′19″N 78°16′59″W
- Country: United States
- State: North Carolina
- County: Warren
- Elevation: 423 ft (129 m)
- Time zone: UTC-5 (Eastern (EST))
  - Summer (DST): UTC-4 (EDT)
- ZIP code: 27553
- Area code: 252
- GNIS feature ID: 989290

Manson is an unincorporated community in Warren County, North Carolina, United States. The community is located on U.S. Route 1, 5 miles (8.0 km) west-southwest of Norlina. Manson has a post office with ZIP code 27553.

Manson was originally known as Cheathamville. The name changed to Branchville after a branch of the Roanoke Valley Railway joined the Raleigh and Gaston Railroad in the community in 1858. The following year the community was renamed Mason in honor of O. F. Mason, a local doctor. The locale was incorporated in 1874, but it later grew inactive in municipal activities. The Green Duke House was listed on the National Register of Historic Places in 1974.
