= Gladys Smithwick =

American medical missionary

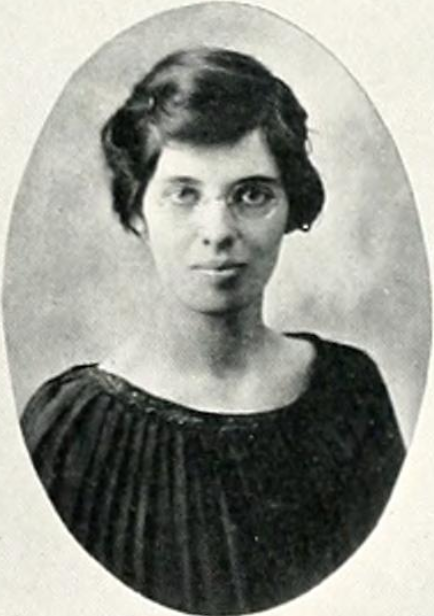
- Gladys Smithwick, from a 1924 yearbook
- Born: Laura Gladys Smithwick; May 28, 1898; Warren County, North Carolina
- Died: December 28, 1964 (aged 66); Charlotte, North Carolina
- Occupations: Physician, Christian missionary

Laura Gladys Smithwick (May 28, 1898 – December 28, 1964) was an American physician. She served as a Presbyterian medical missionary in China and the Belgian Congo.

== Early life ==
Smithwick was born in Warren County, North Carolina, one of the eight children of James Walter Smithwick and Laura S. Fort Smithwick. She completed a bachelor's degree at Oxford College in North Carolina in 1919. She earned a medical degree the Medical College of Virginia in 1925, where she was a member of the Alpha Epsilon Iota professional society. She later earned a master's degree in public health at Tulane University, and studied anesthesiology at Massachusetts Memorial Hospital in Boston.

== Career ==
After medical school, Smithwick worked at the Catawba Sanatorium in Virginia, and the Rhode Island State Sanatorium. She spent much of her career as a medical missionary with the American Southern Presbyterian Mission. She was posted in China from 1929 to 1935, where she was co-director of a women's hospital at Suzhou. She was an anesthesiologist and an active clubwoman in Lexington, Kentucky, in the 1930s and 1940s.

Smithwick hoped to return to China after World War II; instead, she studied French in Belgium, and worked at a leprosarium in the Kasai Province of the Belgian Congo, from 1949 to 1963.

On furloughs in the United States, she spoke about her work at Presbyterian churches.

== Personal life ==
Smithwick died in 1964, aged 66 years, at a hospital in Charlotte, North Carolina. There is a file of her letters in the Presbyterian Historical Society archives.
