= The Shaw Group =

American engineering company

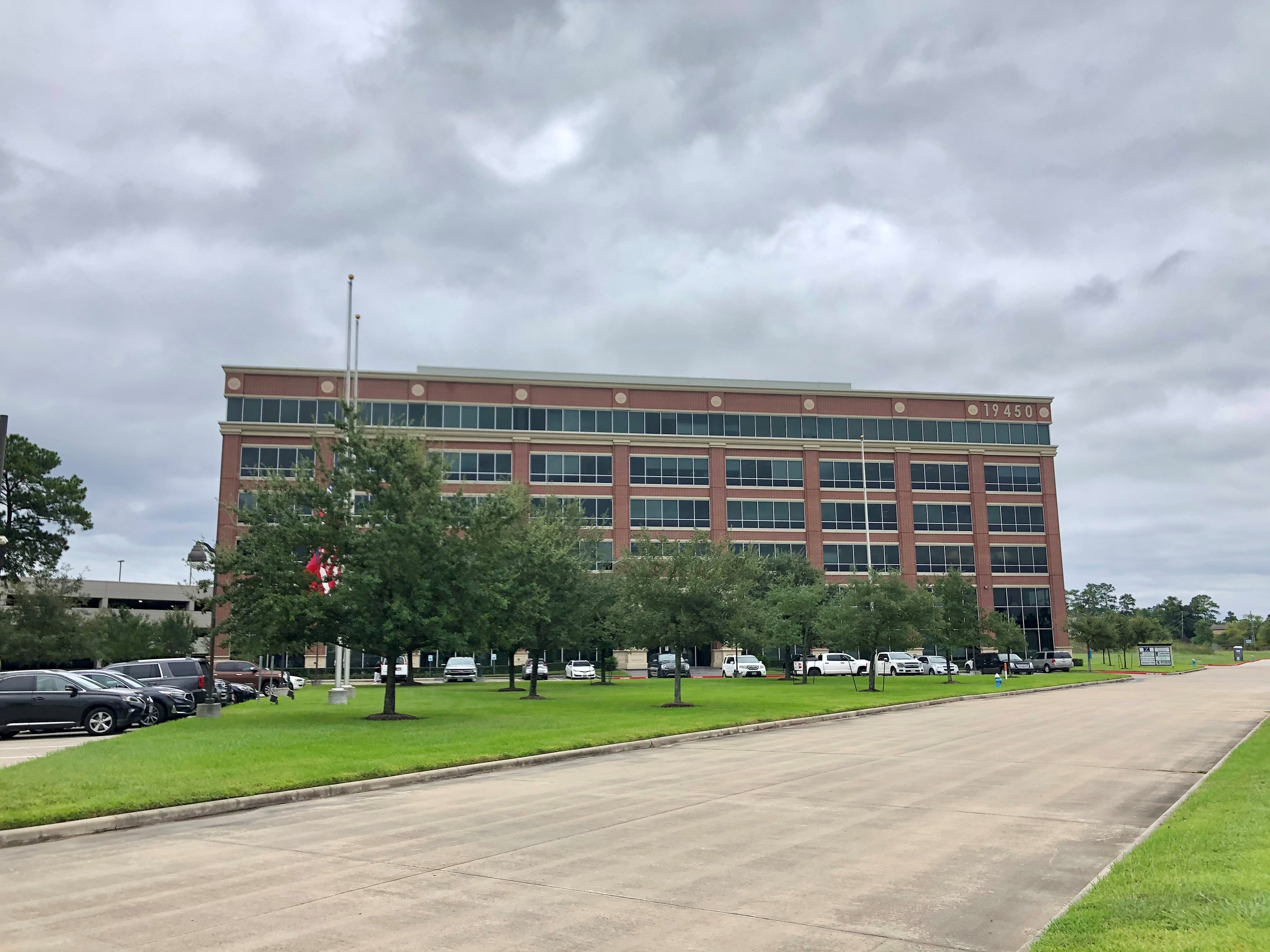
- Founded: 1983; 43 years ago
- Founder: J.M. Bernhard Jr.; Oscar J.LaFleur; A.W. Angelo
- Headquarters: Houston, Texas
- Key people: Mike Childers (CEO); Sachin Singh (COO); Andrew Cannon (CFO)
- Website: Official website

The Shaw Group is a pipe and steel fabrication firm specializing in induction bending. Headquartered in Houston, Texas, Shaw employs approximately 1,400 people across its offices and operations in North America and the Middle East.

== History ==
Shaw was founded in 1986 by J.M. Bernhard Jr., Oscar J.LaFleur, and A.W. Angelo as a fabrication shop. The company was originally known as Shaw Industries Inc. Shaw grew by acquiring stock of Alloy Piping Products, Fronek A/DE, Inc, Naptech, Inc., Pipe Shields Inc., United Crafts, Inc., Merit Industrial Constructors, Inc., Cojafex B.V., Prospect Industries plc, joined with Entergy Corporation to create EntergyShaw L.L.C., Stone & Webster Inc., IT Corporation, Envirogen, Inc., MWR, Inc., Badger Technologies from Washington Group International, and Energy Delivery Services from Duke Energy Global Markets, Inc.

In 2006 the company acquired a 20% interest in the Westinghouse Electric Company, the rest majority owned by Toshiba. In September 2011, Toshiba was reported to be in talks to acquire the Shaw stake. Toshiba is paying $1.6 billion for the 20% stake under a Shaw-owned option, Shaw CEO J.M. Bernhard Jr. said. Shaw said it was the 50% rise in the yen on its yen-denominated debt over five years which led it to exercise its sale option. The option was part of the 2006 purchase terms. The transaction was completed in January 2013, and brought Toshiba's stake in Westinghouse to 87%.

In July 2012 CB&I agreed to buy Shaw for approximately $3 billion. In December 2012 shareholders from both companies approved the transaction and it officially closed in February 2013. In 2018 CB&I was acquired by McDermott International for approximately $6 billion.

In January 2020 McDermott filed for Chapter 11. On June 1, 2020 it was announced that McDermott has sold the former Shaw Group's pipe fabrication assets to Shaw Acquisitions Holdings LLC for an unknown price. The assets include pipe fabrication, piping, structural steel fabrication, mechanical assembly, and modularization subsidiaries. In this transaction, Shaw Acquisitions Holdings LLC received seven facilities located in Walker and Lake Charles, Louisiana; El Dorado, Arkansas; Laurens, South Carolina; Clearfield, Utah; Abu Dhabi, UAE; and Askar, Bahrain. "As part of the deal, Shaw also acquired rights to The Shaw Group trademark"

The Shaw Group has moved its headquarters from Baton Rouge, Louisiana to Houston, Texas. The CEO is Mike Childers, COO is Sachin Singh, and CFO is Andrew Cannon.

== See also ==
- Shaw Center for the Arts
