= Nutbush Township, Warren County, North Carolina =

Nutbush Township
- Township
- Location within the state of North Carolina
- Coordinates: 36°28′12″N 78°16′48″W
- Country: United States
- State: North Carolina
- County: Warren
- Time zone: UTC-5 (Eastern (EST))
  - Summer (DST): UTC-4 (EDT)

Nutbush Township is one of twelve townships in Warren County, North Carolina, United States.

== Demographics ==
As of the 2020 U.S. Census, the total population of Nutbush Township is 2,181 in 881 housing units. The average household size is 2.67 persons, and the average family size is 3.18 persons. Of the total population, 63.5% were Black, 29.8% White, 3.6% Hispanic or Latino, 1.1% American Indian or Alaskan Native, 0.1% Asian, 3% were of another ethnicity, and 0.7% of the population was foreign born. The median age is 44.0 years.

== Geography ==
Nutbush Township is located at 36.47° North, 78.28° West.

The township consists of 32.3 square miles (84 km^{2}) land area and 1.5 square miles (3.9 km^{2}) water area.
