= IT Corporation =

American hazardous waste disposal company

- Company type: Industrial company
- Founded: 1970
- Headquarters: United States

IT Corporation was a United States industrial company whose principal business was the disposal of industrial hazardous waste. At least as early as the 1970s the company was one of the largest market share holders of the liquid hazardous waste disposal sector in the western U.S. One of the principal facilities was a large set of industrial waste disposal ponds in Martinez, California.

The business activities of IT fell under strict regulation by the Bay Area Air Quality Management District and the State of California Regional Water Quality Control Board, as well as the Contra Costa County Health Department.

== Air quality oversight ==
The proximity of the Martinez ponds to sensitive receptors including residences, led to odor complaints from individuals, especially on low wind velocity days when the ponds were upwind of residences. IT established an "on call" air monitoring response to test odor whenever the city of Martinez received a citizen complaint. These tests, together with routine periodic monitoring, provided an extensive database to assist in managing waste pond decision-making.

== Water quality oversight ==
To protect groundwater, IT conducted regular groundwater and waste pond sampling to test for a range of analytes as well as pH. These test results were submitted to the county health department and the state water board. Generally water quality testing confirmed the satisfactory operation of IT's liner control program.

== Panoche facility ==
IT Corporation operated a 248 acres (100 ha) Class I hazardous waste landfill at 2251 Lake Herman Road in Benicia, Solano County, known as the Panoche facility. The site was established in 1968 by J & J Disposal and acquired by IT Corporation in 1975.

During active operations from 1971 to 1986, the facility received between 80,000 and 220,000 tons of hazardous waste annually, including petroleum refining waste, paint pigments, contaminated soils, and oily slurries.

In 1987, the Solano County Planning Commission determined that IT was out of compliance with multiple permit conditions, including encroachment into a required 200-foot buffer zone, and ordered closure. This decision was upheld by the California Supreme Court in IT Corp. v. Solano County Bd. of Supervisors (1991).

Closure construction was completed in 1998 and certified by the California Department of Toxic Substances Control (DTSC) in 1999. Following IT Corporation's 2002 bankruptcy, the IT Environmental Liquidating Trust was established to manage ongoing post-closure care and groundwater remediation at the site.

== Bankruptcy sale on winding up business ==
In early 2002, after IT declared bankruptcy, substantially all IT assets and some liabilities were sold to the Shaw Group. Prior its bankruptcy, IT Corporation was involved in the Encanto Gas Holder decommissioning for San Diego Gas and Electric, and the IT project manager for the decommissioning is a named defendant in the environmental crimes trial United States v. San Diego Gas and Electric (2007).

== See also ==
- Evaporation ponds
- Odor
