= Warren County, North Carolina =

County in North Carolina, United States

- County
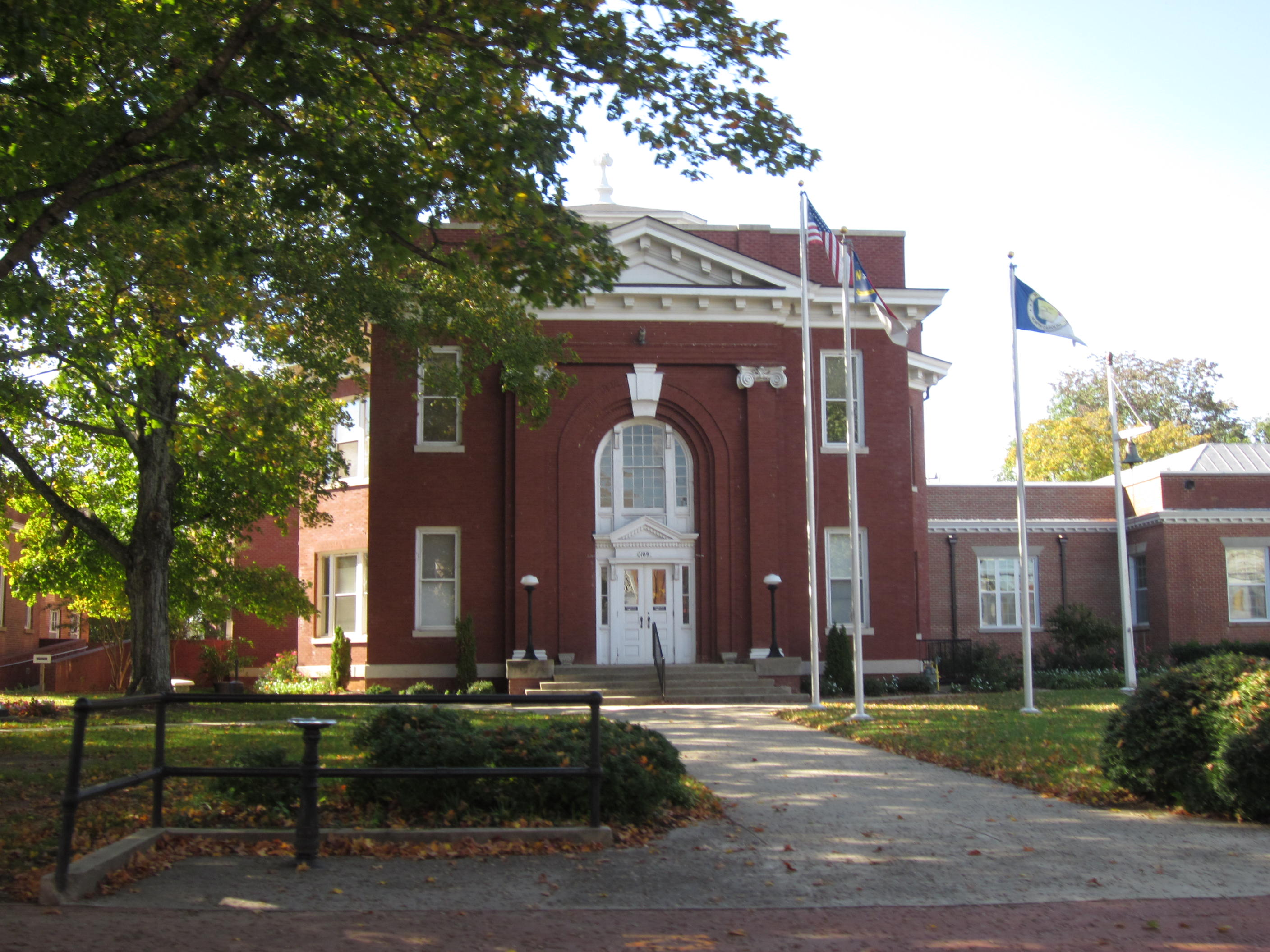
- Warren County Courthouse in Warrenton

- Flag Seal Logo

- Location within the U.S. state of North Carolina
- Coordinates: 36.40°N 78.10°W
- Country: United States
- State: North Carolina
- Founded: 1779
- Named for: Joseph Warren
- Seat: Warrenton
- Largest community: Warrenton

Area
  - Total: 444.30 sq mi (1,150.7 km^{2})
  - Land: 429.39 sq mi (1,112.1 km^{2})
  - Water: 14.91 sq mi (38.6 km^{2}) 3.36%

Population (2020)
  - Total: 18,642
  - Estimate (2025): 18,898 ▲
  - Density: 43.415/sq mi (16.763/km^{2})
- Time zone: UTC−5 (Eastern)
  - Summer (DST): UTC−4 (EDT)
- Congressional district: 1st
- Website: www.warrencountync.com

Warren County is a county located in the northeastern Piedmont region of the U.S. state of North Carolina, on the northern border with Virginia, made famous for a landfill and birthplace of the environmental justice movement. As of the 2020 census, its population was 18,642. Its county seat is Warrenton. It was a center of tobacco and cotton plantations, education, and later textile mills.

== History ==
The county was established in 1779 from the northern half of Bute County. It was named for Joseph Warren of Massachusetts, a physician and general in the American Revolutionary War who was killed at the Battle of Bunker Hill. The county seat was designated at Warrenton later that year. In 1786, part of Granville County was moved to Warren. Developed as a tobacco and cotton farming area, Warrenton became a center of commerce and was one of the wealthiest towns in the state from 1840 to 1860. Many planters built fine homes there. Along with its slave population, Warren had one of the largest free black populations in antebellum North Carolina.

The county's economy declined after the American Civil War, though its large black population briefly exercised significant political influence during the Reconstruction era. Warren's economy, like those of its neighboring counties in northeastern North Carolina, continued to struggle until it gained some manufacturing businesses in the 20th century. In 1881, parts of Warren County, Franklin County and Granville County were combined to form Vance County.

The 1970s recession in the United States severely impacted Warren County. By 1980, it was one of the poorest counties in the state, with unemployment peaking in 1982 at 13.3 percent. The county pushed for industrial development to ameliorate struggles in the agricultural sector without much success.

From 1990 to 2016, manufacturing employment rates declined by about two-thirds. Since the late 20th century, county residents have worked to attract other industrial and business development. Soul City, a "planned community" development, was funded by the Department of Housing and Urban Development (HUD). It has not been successful in attracting business and industry, and has not developed as much housing as intended.

=== PCB issue ===
In 1978, a transformer manufacturer contracted a trucking company to illegally dump polychlorinated biphenyls (PCBs) alongside roads in North Carolina. The state of North Carolina assumed responsibility for cleaning up the pollution, and in December 1978, the state government purchased land in the Warren County community of Afton to establish a landfill to dispose of the chemical waste. Local residents began organizing to protest the planned disposal site, arguing better disposal options existed and that a hazardous waste facility would undercut the county's ability to attracted new industry. National civil rights organizations and politicians became involved, and about 500 protestors were arrested in September 1982 for attempting to obstruct the construction of the disposal site. While the demonstrations did not halt the creation of the landfill, the site was eventually detoxified, and a significant amount of historiographic literature attributes the start of the modern environmental justice movement to the protests.

== Geography ==
Interactive map of Warren County

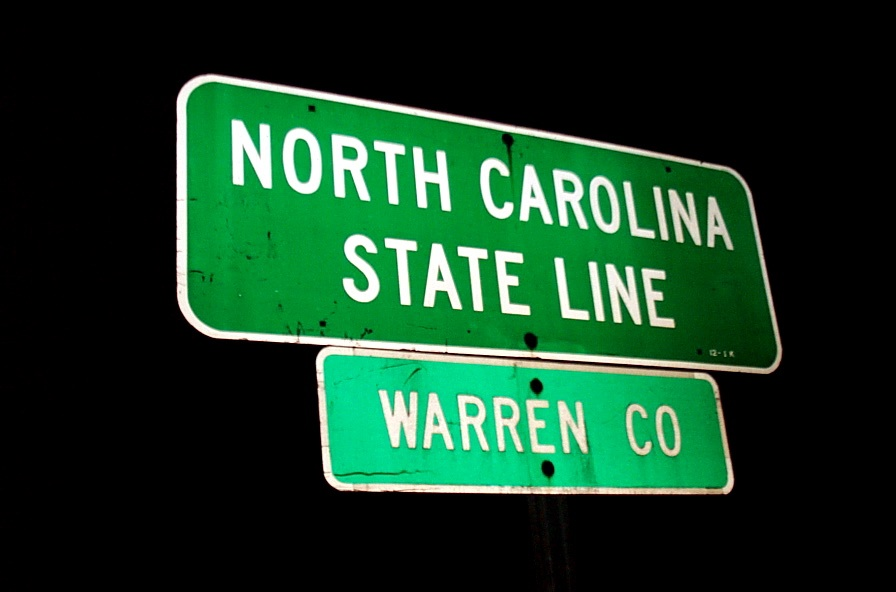
Entering Warren County from Virginia

According to the U.S. Census Bureau, the county has a total area of 444.30 square miles (1,150.7 km^{2}), of which 429.39 square miles (1,112.1 km^{2}) is land and 14.91 square miles (38.6 km^{2}) (3.36%) is water. It is bordered by the North Carolina counties of Franklin, Halifax, Nash, Northampton, and Vance, and the Virginia counties of Brunswick and Mecklenburg. It sits in the northeastern section of the state's Piedmont region and lies within the Roanoke and Tar-Pamlico river basins.

=== State and local protected areas ===
- Embro Game Land (part)
- Kerr Lake State Recreation Area (part)
- Magnolia Ernest Recreation Park
- Shocco Creek Game Land (part)

=== Major water bodies ===
- Big Stone House Creek
- Fishing Creek
- Hawtree Creek
- John H. Kerr Reservoir
- Jorden Creek
- Lake Gaston
- Nutbush Creek
- Phoebes Creek
- Possumquarter Creek
- Reedy Creek
- Roanoke River
- Sandy Creek
- Shocco Creek
- Sixpound Creek
- Smith Creek
- Walkers Creek

=== Major highways ===
- I-85
- US 1
- US 158
- US 158 Bus.
- US 401
- NC 4
- NC 43
- NC 58
- NC 903

== Demographics ==
Historical population
Census	Pop.	Note	%±
1790	9,379		—
1800	11,284		20.3%
1810	11,004		−2.5%
1820	11,158		1.4%
1830	11,877		6.4%
1840	12,919		8.8%
1850	13,912		7.7%
1860	15,726		13.0%
1870	17,768		13.0%
1880	22,619		27.3%
1890	19,360		−14.4%
1900	19,151		−1.1%
1910	20,266		5.8%
1920	21,593		6.5%
1930	23,364		8.2%
1940	23,145		−0.9%
1950	23,539		1.7%
1960	19,652		−16.5%
1970	15,810		−19.6%
1980	16,232		2.7%
1990	17,265		6.4%
2000	19,972		15.7%
2010	20,972		5.0%
2020	18,642		−11.1%
2025 (est.)	18,898	▲	1.4%
U.S. Decennial Census; 1790–1960 1900–1990; 1990–2000 2010 2020

With Warren County, the black population is concentrated in areas near 13 pre-Civil War plantation sites. Haliwa-Saponi Native Americans reside primarily in the southeastern portions of the county proximate to the Halifax County communities of Hollister and Essex. White residents are concentrated in Warrenton and in waterfront areas along the county's two large reservoirs.

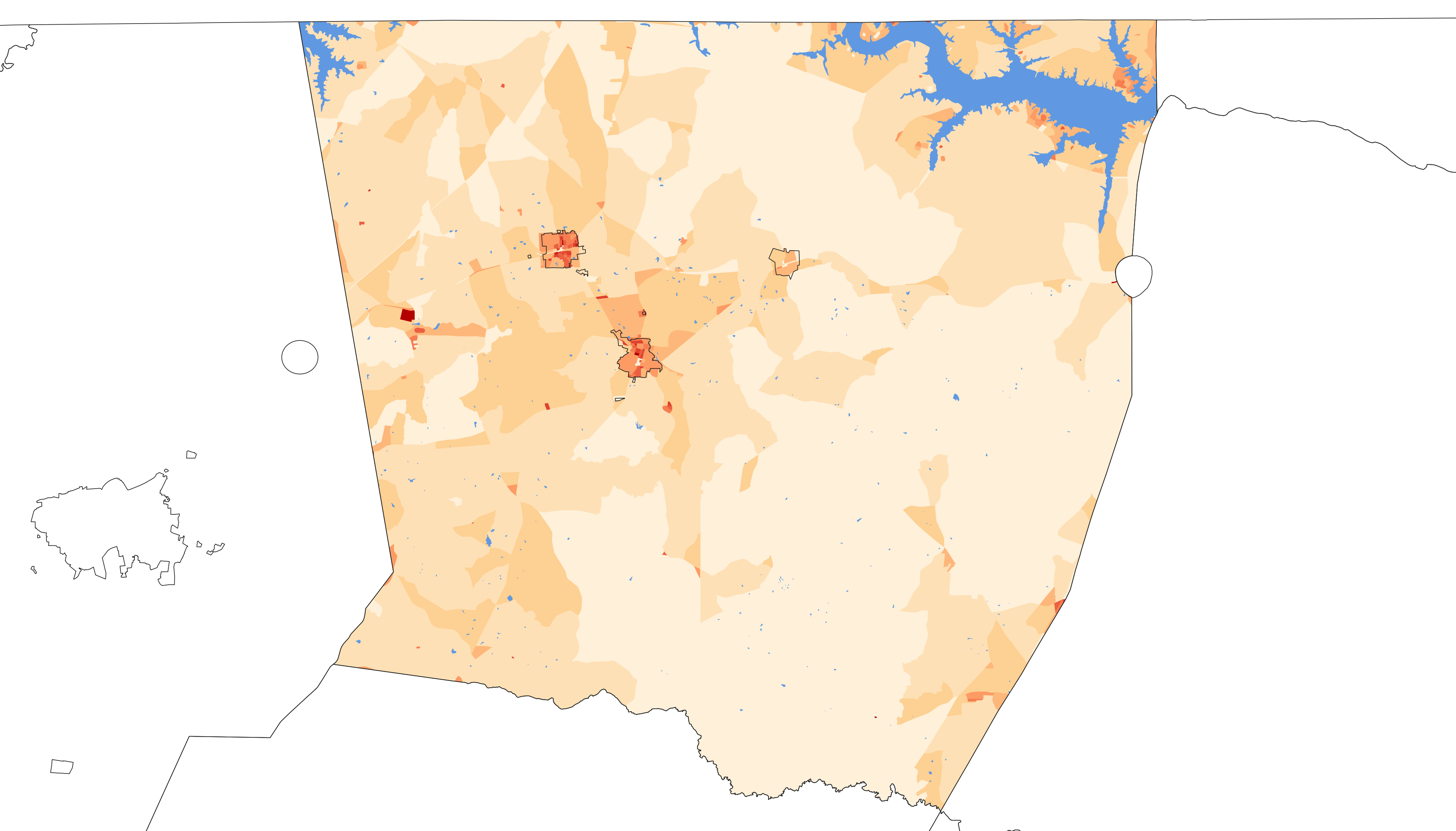
2020 population density of Warren County NC by census block

=== Racial and ethnic composition ===
Warren County, North Carolina – Racial and ethnic composition Note: the US Census treats Hispanic/Latino as an ethnic category. This table excludes Latinos from the racial categories and assigns them to a separate category. Hispanics/Latinos may be of any race.
Race / Ethnicity (NH = Non-Hispanic)	Pop 1980	Pop 1990	Pop 2000	Pop 2010	Pop 2020	% 1980	% 1990	% 2000	% 2010	% 2020
White alone (NH)	5,873	6,571	7,696	7,971	7,209	36.18%	38.06%	38.53%	38.01%	38.67%
Black or African American alone (NH)	9,567	9,818	10,816	10,911	9,049	58.94%	56.87%	54.16%	52.03%	48.54%
Native American or Alaska Native alone (NH)	640	763	940	1,026	953	3.94%	4.42%	4.71%	4.89%	5.11%
Asian alone (NH)	23	14	26	49	62	0.14%	0.08%	0.13%	0.23%	0.33%
Native Hawaiian or Pacific Islander alone (NH)	x	x	4	3	4	x	x	0.02%	0.01%	0.02%
Other race alone (NH)	19	1	8	21	65	0.12%	0.01%	0.04%	0.10%	0.35%
Mixed race or Multiracial (NH)	x	x	165	299	561	x	x	0.83%	1.43%	3.01%
Hispanic or Latino (any race)	110	98	317	692	739	0.68%	0.57%	1.59%	3.30%	3.96%
Total	16,232	17,265	19,972	20,972	18,642	100.00%	100.00%	100.00%	100.00%	100.00%

=== 2020 census ===
As of the 2020 census, there were 18,642 people, 7,894 households, and 4,589 families residing in the county; the median age was 50.0 years, 18.0% of residents were under the age of 18, and 26.2% of residents were 65 years of age or older. For every 100 females there were 99.6 males, and for every 100 females age 18 and over there were 99.0 males age 18 and over.

The racial makeup of the county was 38.9% White, 48.9% Black or African American, 5.2% American Indian and Alaska Native, 0.3% Asian, <0.1% Native Hawaiian and Pacific Islander, 2.7% from some other race, and 3.9% from two or more races; Hispanic or Latino residents of any race comprised 4.0% of the population.

Less than 0.1% of residents lived in urban areas, while 100.0% lived in rural areas.

Of all households, 23.9% had children under the age of 18 living in them, 39.7% were married-couple households, 21.2% had a male householder with no spouse or partner present, and 33.4% had a female householder with no spouse or partner present; about 33.2% of all households were made up of individuals and 17.9% had someone living alone who was 65 years of age or older.

There were 11,309 housing units, of which 30.2% were vacant; among occupied units, 72.6% were owner-occupied and 27.4% were renter-occupied, with a homeowner vacancy rate of 1.9% and rental vacancy rate of 6.0%.

The county's population declined between the 2010 and 2020 censuses.

=== 2010 census ===
At the 2010 census, there were 20,972 people living in the county. 52.3% were Black or African American, 38.8% White, 5.0% Native American, 0.2% Asian, 2.0% of some other race and 1.6% of two or more races. 3.3% were Hispanic or Latino (of any race).

=== 2000 census ===
At the 2000 census, there were 19,972 people, 7,708 households, and 5,449 families living in the county. The population density was 47 people per square mile (18 people/km^{2}). There were 10,548 housing units at an average density of 25 units per square mile (9.7 units/km^{2}). The racial makeup of the county was 54.49% Black or African American, 38.90% White, 4.79% Native American, 0.13% Asian, 0.03% Pacific Islander, 0.79% from other races, and 0.88% from two or more races. 1.59% of the population were Hispanic or Latino of any race.

There were 7,708 households, out of which 28.20% had children under the age of 18 living with them, 49.20% were married couples living together, 17.30% had a female householder with no husband present, and 29.30% were non-families. 26.20% of all households were made up of individuals, and 12.20% had someone living alone who was 65 years of age or older. The average household size was 2.48 and the average family size was 2.97.

In the county, the population was spread out, with 23.50% under the age of 18, 8.00% from 18 to 24, 26.30% from 25 to 44, 24.80% from 45 to 64, and 17.40% who were 65 years of age or older. The median age was 40 years. For every 100 females there were 96.60 males. For every 100 females age 18 and over, there were 95.00 males.

The median income for a household in the county was $28,351, and the median income for a family was $33,602. Males had a median income of $26,928 versus $20,787 for females. The per capita income for the county was $14,716. About 15.70% of families and 19.40% of the population were below the poverty line, including 24.90% of those under age 18 and 20.80% of those age 65 or over.

== Government and politics ==
United States presidential election results for Warren County, North Carolina
Year	Republican		Democratic		Third party(ies)	
Year	No.	%	No.	%	No.	%
1912	112	9.78%	987	86.20%	46	4.02%
1916	227	15.72%	1,217	84.28%	0	0.00%
1920	295	13.66%	1,865	86.34%	0	0.00%
1924	166	8.43%	1,742	88.43%	62	3.15%
1928	379	15.69%	2,037	84.31%	0	0.00%
1932	110	3.96%	2,661	95.82%	6	0.22%
1936	140	4.39%	3,047	95.61%	0	0.00%
1940	247	8.45%	2,676	91.55%	0	0.00%
1944	242	8.89%	2,480	91.11%	0	0.00%
1948	192	6.93%	2,376	85.75%	203	7.33%
1952	664	18.32%	2,960	81.68%	0	0.00%
1956	718	20.81%	2,733	79.19%	0	0.00%
1960	717	19.31%	2,997	80.69%	0	0.00%
1964	1,909	40.12%	2,849	59.88%	0	0.00%
1968	796	14.79%	2,293	42.60%	2,294	42.62%
1972	2,603	59.62%	1,698	38.89%	65	1.49%
1976	1,427	30.79%	3,185	68.72%	23	0.50%
1980	1,582	29.13%	3,750	69.06%	98	1.80%
1984	2,664	40.25%	3,946	59.63%	8	0.12%
1988	2,163	33.64%	4,249	66.09%	17	0.26%
1992	1,767	24.80%	4,656	65.35%	702	9.85%
1996	1,861	29.36%	4,141	65.33%	337	5.32%
2000	2,202	32.41%	4,576	67.34%	17	0.25%
2004	2,840	35.38%	5,171	64.42%	16	0.20%
2008	3,063	30.04%	7,086	69.50%	46	0.45%
2012	3,140	30.90%	6,978	68.67%	44	0.43%
2016	3,214	32.66%	6,413	65.16%	215	2.18%
2020	3,752	36.45%	6,400	62.18%	141	1.37%
2024	3,976	39.71%	5,872	58.64%	165	1.65%

Warren County has a council-manager government, governed by a five-member board of commissioners. County commissioners are elected at-large to staggered four-year terms and represent one of five single-member districts. The commission hires a county manager to serve as the chief administrative officer for county government and who is responsible for executing the commission's policies.

Warren County is a member of the Kerr-Tar Regional Council of Governments. It is located entirely in the North Carolina Senate's 3rd district, the North Carolina House of Representatives' 27th district, and North Carolina's 1st congressional district. Warren County lies within the bounds of North Carolina's 11th Prosecutorial District, the 9th Superior Court District, and the 9th District Court District. The Haliwa-Saponi Indian Tribe was recognized as a Native American tribe by the state of North Carolina in 1965 and mostly comprises members in Warren and Halifax counties. The tribal government provides services to its members.

== Economy ==
In recent years, Warren County has struggled with poverty and low wages. Glen Raven, a textile company, is a major manufacturing employer in the county.

== Education ==
Education in the area is provided by Warren County Schools. Vance–Granville Community College maintains a satellite campus in the county. According to the 2021 American Community Survey, an estimated 15.2 percent of county residents have attained a bachelor's degree or higher level of education.

== Communities ==
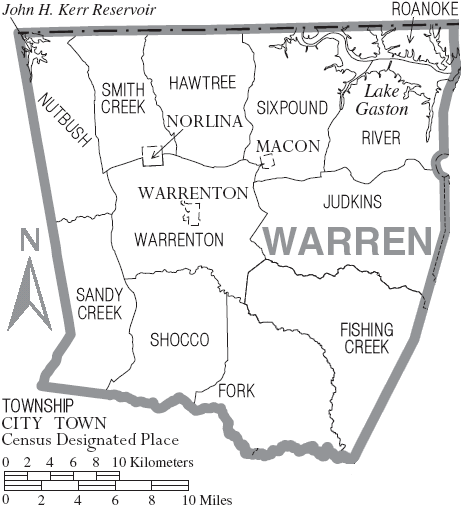
Map of Warren County with municipal and township labels

=== Towns ===
- Macon
- Norlina
- Warrenton (county seat and largest community)

=== Townships ===
Warren County townships are:

- Fishing Creek
- Fork
- Hawtree
- Judkins
- Nutbush
- River
- Roanoke
- Sandy Creek
- Shocco
- Sixpound
- Smith Creek
- Warrenton

=== Unincorporated communities ===
- Afton
- Arcola
- Axtell
- Church Hill
- Creek
- Drewry
- Elams
- Elberon
- Embro
- Enterprise
- Five Forks
- Grove Hill
- Inez
- Liberia
- Lickskillet
- Manson
- Marmaduke
- Oakville
- Odell
- Oine
- Old Bethlehem
- Parktown
- Paschall
- Ridgeway
- Rose Hill
- Snow Hill
- Soul City
- Vaughan
- Vicksboro
- Warren Plains
- Wise

== Notable people ==
- Braxton Bragg, Confederate general
- Thomas Bragg, U.S. senator, North Carolina governor, and Confederate attorney general
- Eva Clayton, congresswoman
- Kirkland H. Donald, United States Navy Admiral and fifth Director of the U.S. Naval Nuclear Propulsion Program
- Benjamin Hawkins, U.S. senator and Superintendent for Indian Affairs (1798–1818)
- John H. Kerr, congressman
- Nathaniel Macon, Speaker of the U.S. House of Representatives and U.S. senator
- William Miller, North Carolina governor
- Reynolds Price, professor emeritus of English at Duke University, major author and essayist of the South
- Matt Ransom, U.S. senator and Confederate general
- Robert Ransom, Confederate general
- Gladys Smithwick, physician and medical missionary in China and the Belgian Congo
- James Turner, North Carolina governor
- Alice Holloway Young, education pioneer who developed the first and oldest voluntary racial integration program in the U.S.

== See also ==
- List of North Carolina counties
- National Register of Historic Places listings in Warren County, North Carolina

== Works cited ==
- Corbitt, David Leroy (2000). The formation of the North Carolina counties, 1663-1943 (reprint ed.). Raleigh: North Carolina Division of Archives and History. OCLC 46398241.
- McGurty, Eileen (2009). Transforming Environmentalism: Warren County, PCBs, and the Origins of Environmental Justice (reprint ed.). Rutgers University Press. ISBN 9780813546780.
- McGurty, Eileen Maura. "Warren County, NC, and the emergence of the environmental justice movement: Unlikely coalitions and shared meanings in local collective action." Society & Natural Resources 13.4 (2000): 373-387. DOI:10.1080/089419200279027
- Powell, William S. (1976). The North Carolina Gazetteer: A Dictionary of Tar Heel Places. Chapel Hill: The University of North Carolina Press. ISBN 9780807812471.
- Wilson, Bev (2018). "Isha Black or Isha White? Racial Identity and Spatial Development in Warren County, NC". Planning Theory & Practice. 19 (2): 261–265. doi:10.1080/14649357.2018.1456816.
