= National Register of Historic Places listings in St. Charles County, Missouri =

Location of St. Charles County in Missouri

This is a list of the National Register of Historic Places listings in St. Charles County, Missouri.

This is intended to be a complete list of the properties and districts on the National Register of Historic Places in St. Charles County, Missouri, United States. Latitude and longitude coordinates are provided for many National Register properties and districts; these locations may be seen together in a map.

There are 36 properties and districts listed on the National Register in the county. Another property was once listed but has been removed.

This National Park Service list is complete through NPS recent listings posted September 26, 2025.

== Current listings ==
	Name on the Register	Image	Date listed	Location	City or town	Description
1	African Church	African Church	November 21, 1980 (#80004366)	554 Madison St. 38°46′57″N 90°29′17″W	St. Charles	
2	Augusta Harmonie Verein	Augusta Harmonie Verein	January 20, 1995 (#94001554)	Junction of Hackman and Church Rds. 38°34′32″N 90°52′44″W	Augusta	
3	Daniel Boone Home	Daniel Boone Home	April 11, 1973 (#73002175)	Hwy. F 38°39′06″N 90°51′14″W	Defiance	
4	Commons Neighborhood Historic District		April 10, 2017 (#100000851)	Roughly bounded by Benton Ave., Clark, 5th, Randolph, Kingshighway, 7th & 6th Sts. 38°47′23″N 90°29′06″W	St. Charles	
5	Robert Ewich Farmstead	Robert Ewich Farmstead	January 20, 1995 (#94001556)	5336 Hackman Rd. 38°34′30″N 90°52′40″W	Augusta	
6	Charles McLee Farris House	Charles McLee Farris House	January 20, 1995 (#94001559)	5517 High St. 38°34′18″N 90°52′58″W	Augusta	
7	First Missouri State Capitol Buildings	First Missouri State Capitol Buildings	April 16, 1969 (#69000313)	208-216 S. Main St. 38°46′47″N 90°28′53″W	St. Charles	
8	Frenchtown Historic District	Frenchtown Historic District	March 14, 1991 (#91000216)	Roughly bounded by N. Fifth, Clark and French Sts. and the Missouri R. 38°47′19″N 90°28′48″W	St. Charles	
9	Dr. C. L. Gerling House	Dr. C. L. Gerling House	January 20, 1995 (#94001558)	245 Lower St. 38°34′22″N 90°52′56″W	Augusta	
10	Harold-Knoernschild Farmstead Historic District	Harold-Knoernschild Farmstead Historic District	September 29, 1994 (#94001145)	199 Jackson St. 38°34′25″N 90°53′04″W	Augusta	
11	Daniel Boone Hays House		April 23, 1973 (#73002176)	SW of Defiance off Hwy. F 38°37′18″N 90°49′19″W	Defiance	
12	Lindenwood Hall	Lindenwood Hall	November 29, 1978 (#78003131)	Lindenwood Colleges campus 38°47′14″N 90°29′58″W	St. Charles	
13	Lindenwood Neighborhood Historic District	Lindenwood Neighborhood Historic District	October 17, 2016 (#16000728)	Roughly bounded by Watson, Gamble, Sibley & Elm Sts. & alley between Houston & N. Kingshighway; 38°47′18″N 90°29′45″W	St. Charles	
14	Oliver L. and Catherine Link House	Oliver L. and Catherine Link House	August 6, 2013 (#13000584)	1005 Jefferson; 38°47′05″N 90°29′35″W	St. Charles	
15	Marten-Becker House	Marten-Becker House	October 11, 1979 (#79003200)	837 First Capitol Dr. 38°46′55″N 90°29′27″W	St. Charles	
16	Isaac McCormick House	Isaac McCormick House	September 10, 2004 (#04000960)	705 MO F 38°38′28″N 90°48′18″W	Defiance	
17	Meier General Store	Meier General Store	July 12, 2002 (#02000794)	3669 Mill St. 38°42′43″N 90°52′47″W	New Melle	
18	Mindrup House-Store	Mindrup House-Store	January 20, 1995 (#94001557)	5543 Water St. 38°34′13″N 90°53′01″W	Augusta	
19	Midtown Neighborhood Historic District	Midtown Neighborhood Historic District	October 29, 2014 (#14000885)	Roughly bounded by Clark, Madison, Jefferson, Kingshighway, 2nd & 3rd Sts. 38°47′00″N 90°29′00″W	St. Charles	
20	Mt. Pleasant Winery Historic District	Mt. Pleasant Winery Historic District	September 29, 1994 (#94001144)	5634 High St. 38°34′13″N 90°52′30″W	Augusta	
21	Newbill-McElhiney House	Newbill-McElhiney House	April 11, 1972 (#72001489)	625 S. Main St. 38°46′35″N 90°29′02″W	St. Charles	
22	Old City Hall	Old City Hall	November 14, 1980 (#80004367)	Central Ave. and Main St. 38°46′51″N 90°28′54″W	St. Charles	
23	Sage Chapel Cemetery		November 2, 2018 (#100003087)	8500 Veterans Memorial Pkwy. 38°48′01″N 90°41′41″W	O'Fallon	
24	St. Charles Historic District	St. Charles Historic District	September 22, 1970; June 4, 1987; May 1, 1991; October 10, 1996 (#70000856); 87000903; 91000504; 96001087	Roughly, Main St. from Adams St. on the north to Boone's Lick Rd. on the south, east to the Missouri river, west to 2nd St. 38°46′45″N 90°28′57″W	St. Charles	A historic district with over 100 contributing buildings. Originally listed on September 22, 1970 with increases on June 4, 1987, May 1, 1991 and October 10, 1996
25	St. Charles Odd Fellows Hall	St. Charles Odd Fellows Hall	April 13, 1987 (#87000569)	117 S. Main; 38°46′50″N 90°28′54″W	St. Charles	
26	St. Mary's Institute of O'Fallon	St. Mary's Institute of O'Fallon	October 26, 2007 (#07001106)	204 N. Main St. 38°48′49″N 90°42′07″W	O'Fallon	
27	St. Paul's Church	St. Paul's Church	September 9, 1982 (#82004713)	SR D 38°42′31″N 90°52′56″W	New Melle	
28	J. F. Schroer House-Store	J. F. Schroer House-Store	January 20, 1995 (#94001555)	252 Lower St. 38°34′21″N 90°52′53″W	Augusta	
29	August Sehrt House	August Sehrt House	September 29, 1994 (#94001143)	275 Webster St. 38°34′17″N 90°53′09″W	Augusta	
30	Staudinger-Grumke House-Store	Staudinger-Grumke House-Store	May 28, 1992 (#92000504)	5503 Locust St. 38°34′27″N 90°52′47″W	Augusta	
31	Stone Row	Stone Row	July 29, 1969 (#69000314)	314-330 S. Main St. 38°46′45″N 90°28′56″W	St. Charles	
32	Dr. John H. Stumberg House	Dr. John H. Stumberg House	July 12, 1978 (#78003132)	100 S. 3rd St. 38°46′53″N 90°29′00″W	St. Charles	
33	Walnut Street Historic District	Walnut Street Historic District	September 29, 1994 (#94001142)	Walnut and S side of Locust Sts. between Jackson and Lower Sts. 38°34′26″N 90°52′53″W	Augusta	
34	Samuel Stewart Watson House	Samuel Stewart Watson House	September 23, 1982 (#82004714)	205 S. Duchesne Dr. 38°47′39″N 90°30′16″W	St. Charles	
35	Wentzville Tobacco Company Factory	Wentzville Tobacco Company Factory	July 5, 1990 (#90001024)	406 South Elm St. 38°48′37″N 90°51′05″W	Wentzville	
36	Westhoff Grain and Mercantile Company	Westhoff Grain and Mercantile Company	April 2, 2025 (#100011651)	108 S. Main Street; 38°48′38″N 90°41′59″W	O'Fallon	Built c. 1860 for the Westhoff Grain and Mercantile Company, the longest continuously run business in O'Fallon

== Former listing ==
	Name on the Register	Image	Date listed	Date removed	Location	City or town	Description
1	Wolf-Ruebeling House		March 29, 1983 (#83001038)	December 19, 1994	MO 94	Defiance	Destroyed in a 1985 fire.

== See also ==
- List of National Historic Landmarks in Missouri
- National Register of Historic Places listings in Missouri
