= Becker House (disambiguation) =

Becker House may refer to:

in the United States

(by state, then city)

- Brinkerhoff-Becker House, Ypsilanti, Michigan, listed on the National Register of Historic Places (NRHP)
- Marten-Becker House, St. Charles, Missouri, NRHP-listed
- George Becker House, Los Ojos, New Mexico, listed on the NRHP in Rio Arriba County, New Mexico
- Becker Farmhouse, Duanesburg, New York, NRHP-listed
- Carl Becker House, a residential college at Cornell University, Ithaca, New York
- Becker Stone House, Schoharie, New York, NRHP-listed
- Becker-Westfall House, Schoharie, New York, NRHP-listed
- Francis Becker House, Clinton, Ohio, listed on the NRHP in Summit County, Ohio
- Becker House, Springdale, Ohio, NRHP-listed
- Christine Becker House, Portland, Oregon, NRHP-listed
- Becker-Hildebrandt House, Brenham, Texas, listed on the NRHP in Washington County, Texas
- Gustav Becker House, Ogden, Utah, NRHP-listed

in Australia

- The Shine Dome, formerly known as Becker House, headquarters of the Australian Academy of Science, Canberra, ACT
