= African Church =

African Church may refer to:

- Early African church, Christian communities inhabiting Roman Africa
- The African Church, a Christian denomination in Nigeria
- African Church (St. Charles, Missouri), U.S., a historic African Methodist Episcopal church
- African Episcopal Church of St. Thomas, Philadelphia, U.S.
- State Street AME Zion Church, founded as the African Church of the City of Mobile, Alabama, U.S.

== See also ==
- Christianity in Africa
- African Methodist Episcopal Church
