= Staudinger–Grumke House–Store =

Historic house in Missouri, United States

- U.S. National Register of Historic Places
- U.S. Historic district – Contributing property
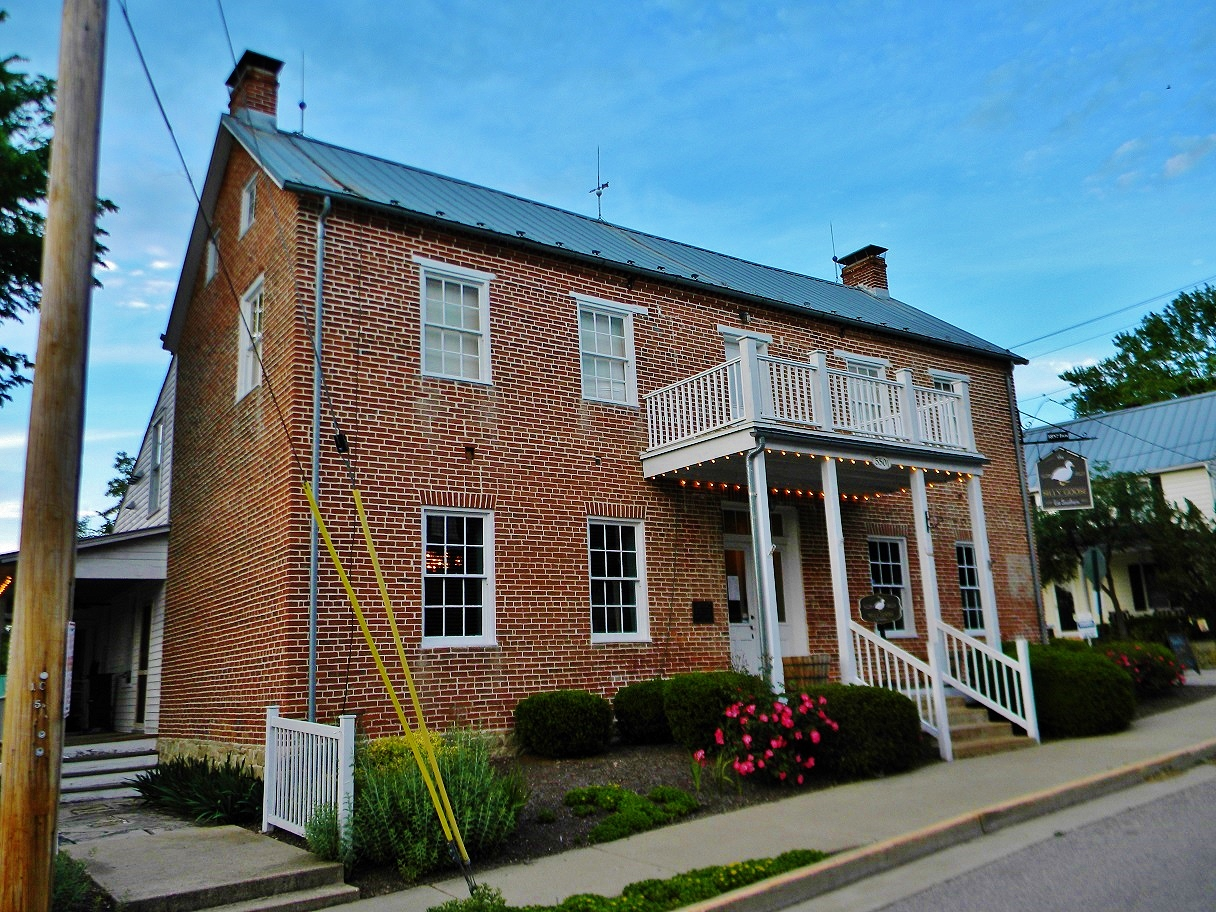
- Staudinger–Grumke House, May 2016

- Location within Missouri Location within the United States
- Location: 5503 Locust St., Augusta, Missouri
- Coordinates: 38°34′27″N 90°52′47″W
- Area: 2.5 acres (1.0 ha)
- Built: c. 1859, 1880
- Architectural style: House–store
- NRHP reference No.: 92000504
- Added to NRHP: May 28, 1992

Staudinger–Grumke House–Store is a historic home and store located at Augusta, St. Charles County, Missouri. The house was built about 1859 by August Staudinger, and was later purchased by George Grumke in 1873, who used the structure to operate a saloon on the ground floor. The property was in the Grumke family until 1932.

The home is a 2 1/2-story, five-bay, brick I-house. The store occupied the first floor with living quarters above. It measures approximately 46 feet wide by 43 feet deep and has a one-story frame addition built about 1880.

It was added to the National Register of Historic Places in 1992. It is located in the Walnut Street Historic District.
