= Walnut Street Historic District (Augusta, Missouri) =

Historic district in Missouri, United States

- U.S. National Register of Historic Places
- U.S. Historic district
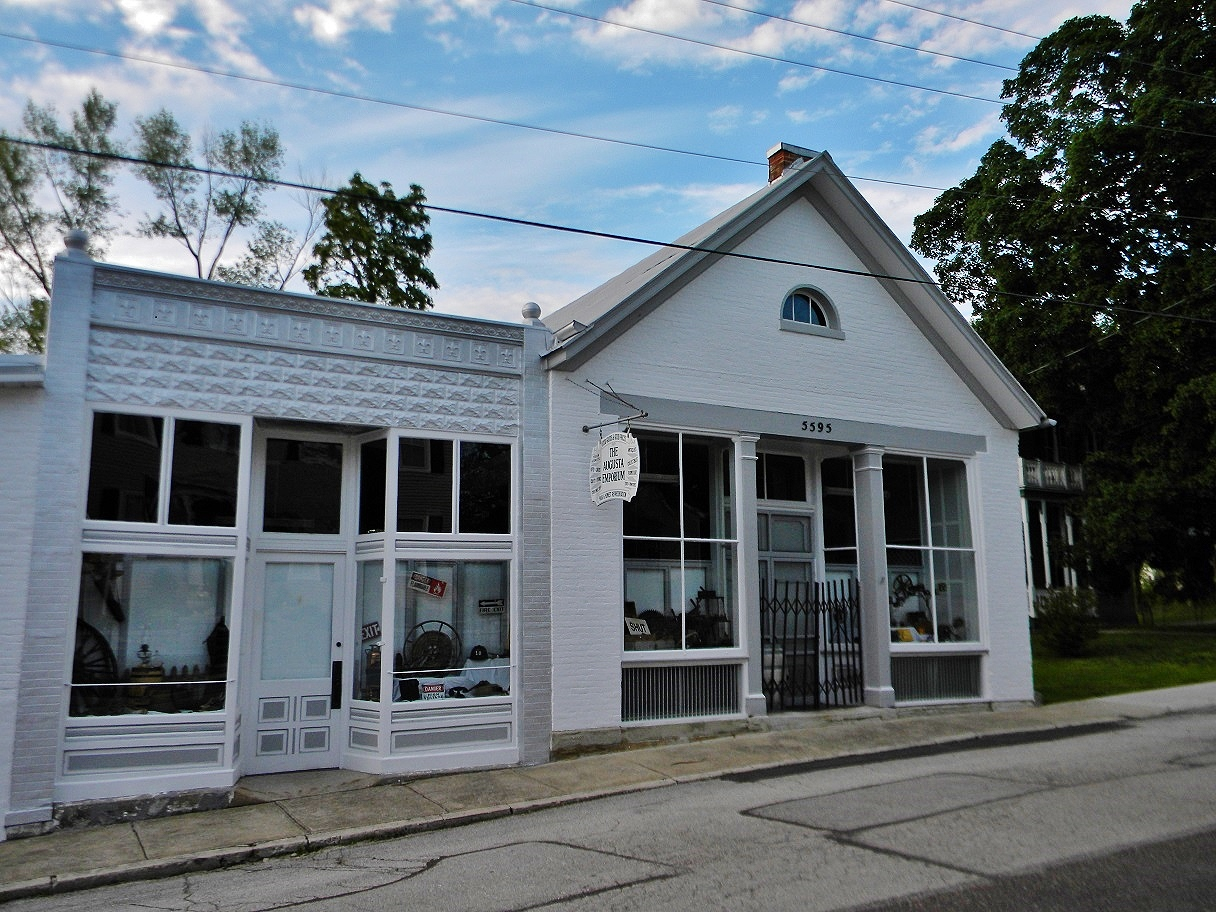

- Location within Missouri Location within the United States
- Location: Walnut and S side of Locust Sts. between Jackson and Lower Sts., Augusta, Missouri
- Coordinates: 38°34′26″N 90°52′53″W
- Area: 15 acres (6.1 ha)
- Architectural style: Bungalow/craftsman, Queen Anne
- MPS: Augusta MPS
- NRHP reference No.: 94001142
- Added to NRHP: September 29, 1994

The Walnut Street Historic District is a national historic district located at the northern end of Augusta, St. Charles County, Missouri. The District includes residential and commercial buildings constructed from the mid-19th to mid-20th centuries. Although there have been some minor modifications, the District appears as it did when the town was founded, and many buildings are still owned by descendants of German settlers. Located in the district is the separately listed Staudinger-Grumke House-Store.

It was added to the National Register of Historic Places in 1994.
