= Dr. C. L. Gerling House =

Historic house in Missouri, United States

- U.S. National Register of Historic Places
- Location within Missouri Location within the United States
- Location: 245 Lower St., Augusta, Missouri
- Coordinates: 38°34′22″N 90°52′56″W
- Area: less than one acre
- Built: 1850
- MPS: Augusta MPS
- NRHP reference No.: 94001558
- Added to NRHP: January 20, 1995

Dr. C. L. Gerling House is a historic home located at Augusta, St. Charles County, Missouri. It was built about 1850, and is a 1 1/2-story, half-timber frame dwelling sheathed in weatherboard. The house measures approximately 27 feet wide and 35 feet deep. It has a side gable roof and sits on a stone foundation.

It was added to the National Register of Historic Places in 1995.
