= Mt. Pleasant Winery Historic District =

Historic district in Missouri, United States

- U.S. National Register of Historic Places
- U.S. Historic district
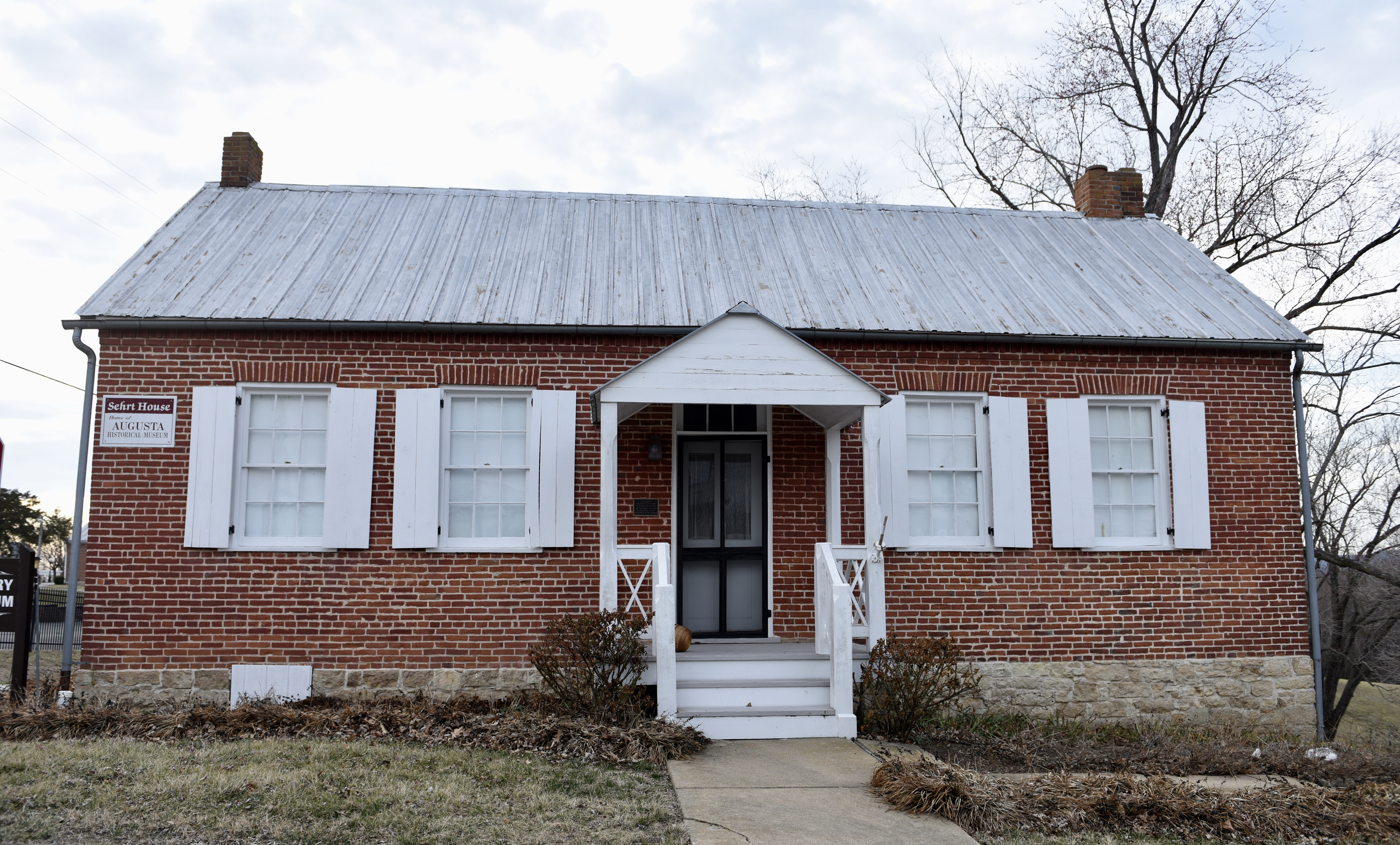

- Location within Missouri Location within the United States
- Location: 5634 High St. Augusta, Missouri
- Coordinates: 38°34′13″N 90°52′30″W
- Area: less than one acre
- Built: c. 1859, c. 1865, c. 1880, 1881
- MPS: Augusta MPS
- NRHP reference No.: 94001144
- Added to NRHP: September 29, 1994

Mt. Pleasant Winery Historic District is a historic winery and national historic district located at Augusta, St. Charles County, Missouri. The district encompasses a frame half-timber house (c. 1859) with brick outbuilding (c. 1880); a brick winery building (1881) with a stone well house (1881); and wine cellars (c. 1865). The winery building measures approximately 24 feet by 62 feet, 6 inches, with a 15 foot by 17 foot extension leading to the wine cellars. The wine cellars feature brick floors and brick barrel vaults supported by stone walls.

It was added to the National Register of Historic Places in 1995.
