= J. F. Schroer House-Store =

Historic house in Missouri, United States

- U.S. National Register of Historic Places
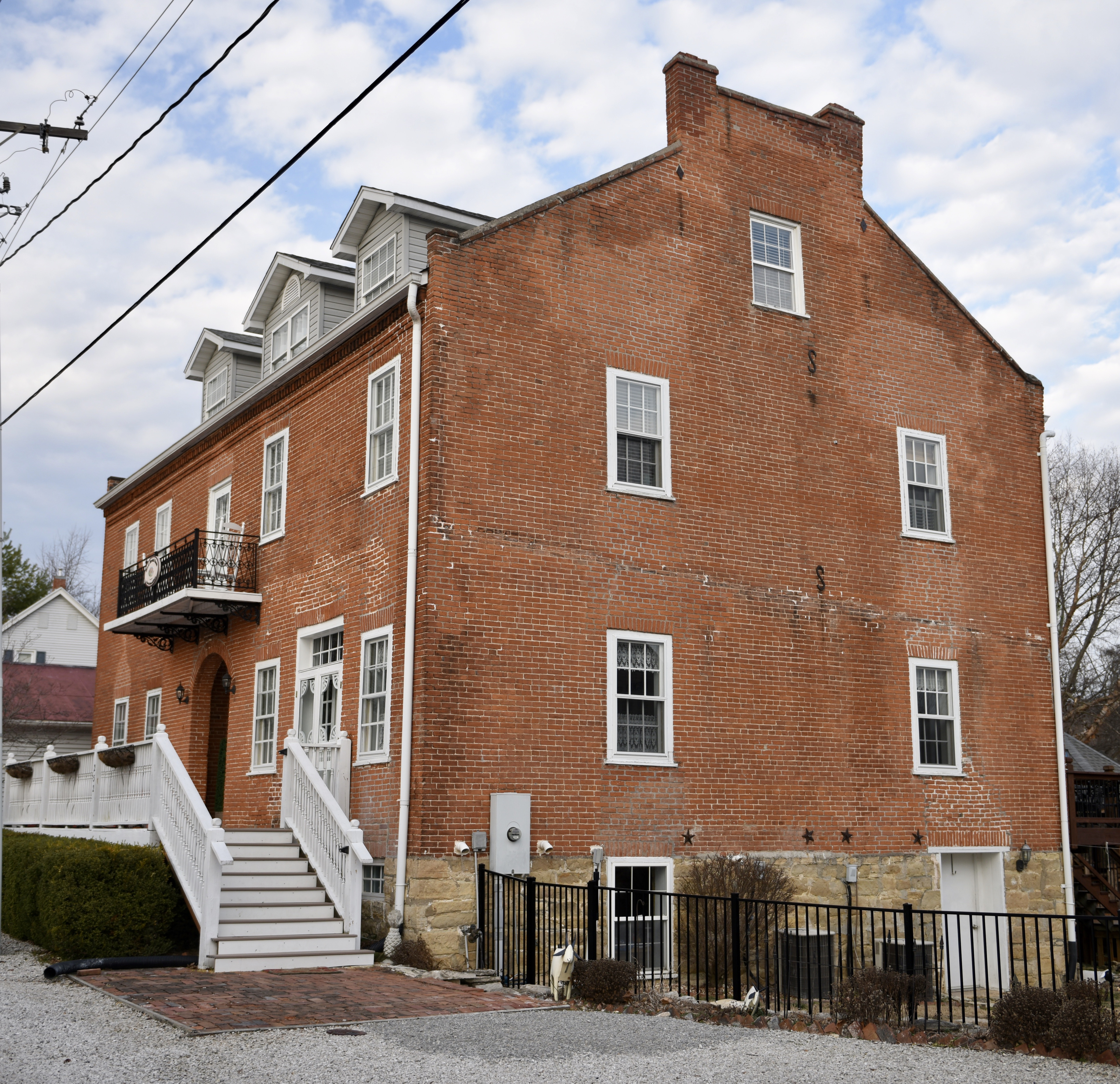

- Location within Missouri Location within the United States
- Location: 252 Lower St. Augusta, Missouri
- Coordinates: 38°34′21″N 90°52′53″W
- Area: less than one acre
- Built: c. 1865-1866
- MPS: Augusta MPS
- NRHP reference No.: 94001555
- Added to NRHP: January 20, 1995

J. F. Schroer House-Store is a historic home and store located at Augusta, St. Charles County, Missouri. The house was built about 1865–1866, and is a 2 1/2-story, brick dwelling with a central passage plan. The store occupied the first floor with living quarters above. It measures approximately 50 feet wide by 36 feet deep and has a side-gable roof and wine cellar.

It was added to the National Register of Historic Places in 1995.
