= Harold–Knoernschild Farmstead Historic District =

Historic district in Missouri, United States

- U.S. National Register of Historic Places
- U.S. Historic district
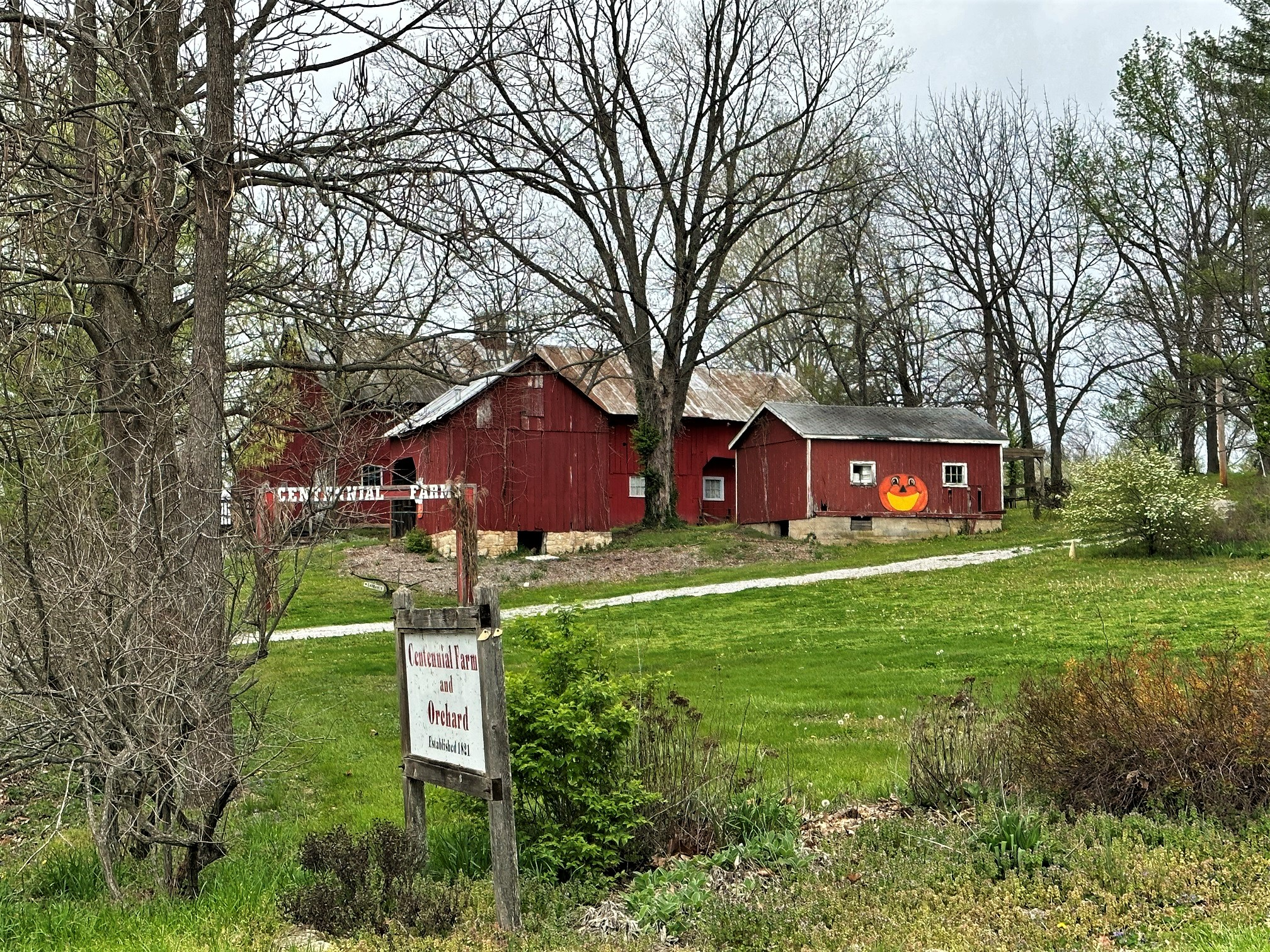

- Location within Missouri Location within the United States
- Location: 199 Jackson St., Augusta, Missouri
- Coordinates: 38°34′25″N 90°53′4″W
- Area: 2.5 acres (1.0 ha)
- Built: c. 1836, c. 1860, c. 1882
- MPS: Augusta MPS
- NRHP reference No.: 94001145
- Added to NRHP: September 29, 1994

The Harold–Knoernschild Farmstead Historic District, also known as Centennial Farms, is a historic home and farm and national historic district located at Augusta, St. Charles County, Missouri. The house was built about 1836, and is a two-story, log farmhouse sheathed in weatherboard. A one-story brick addition was constructed about 1882. The house features a stone chimney with hearths on both stories and a two-story, full facade porch. Also on the property is a contributing board-and-batten barn dated to about 1860 and two early-20th century farm outbuildings. The house was built by Leonard Harold, founder of Augusta.

It was added to the National Register of Historic Places in 1994.

== History ==
The Leonard Harold two story log cabin is located in the picturesque German town of Augusta. The town is mostly built on hills which once overlooked the Missouri River. In 1880 there was a serious flood and the channel changed its course, cutting off the river traffic and moving the landing 12 miles from Augusta.

After receiving a land grant for his services in the war of 1812, Leonard Harold and his wife Kathryn left by their own boat from Pennsylvania. They brought their household goods and two families of slaves. Harold named his town Mount Pleasant and built a two-story log house and two log cabins for his slaves. In building his home he chose the valley by a small creek. Although parts of Harold's land had wonderful views of the river, he chose the valley to build in as there was a good spring nearby.

The style of the house was influenced by French architecture with two story porches running the full length of two sides. The house is 16 feet wide and 32 feet long, not including the two porches. The downstairs was divided into two rooms, although it is not known whether the partition was added later, or was put in at the time the house was built. The upstairs consisted of a single room for a long time, but a partition was added later. Incidentally, material from a steamboat which sank near Augusta was used for the partition. There is a large limestone chimney at one end of the house with fireplaces on both floors. The fireplace downstairs measures five feet wide and was used for all of the cooking as well as for heating. There are hooks on both sides for the cranes which held the cooking pots. The fireplace on the second floor is smaller. There is also an attic and a cellar under the house. Originally there was a second cellar below the first, but this has since been filled in.

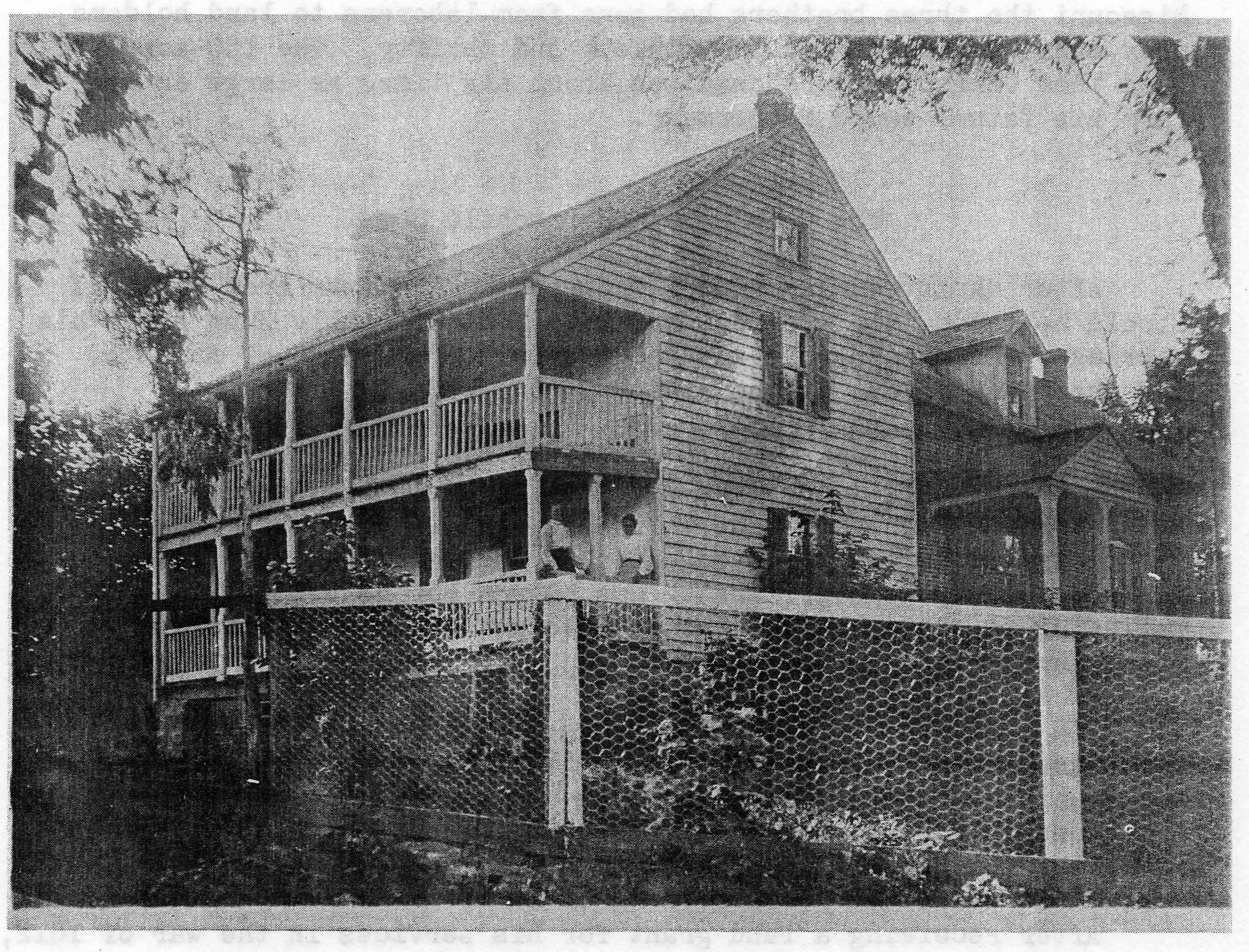
This photograph, taken in 1906, shows the two story log house built by Leonard Harold, and the brick addition built by Christian Knoernschild. The two girls standing on the porch are Otillie and Eugenia Knoernschild.

The outside of the house is covered with clapboard. Only on the porches are the logs exposed. From the appearance of the logs underneath, they were covered at the time the house was built. Most of the logs are oak and some are walnut.

After buying the house in 1854, Christian Knoernschild added four more rooms to the north, removing the two porches on that side. This addition is constructed of brick, which was made from clay dug and fired on the farm. In a pasture just south of the house the places where clay was dug from the hillside can still be seen, and broken and discarded bricks are still uncovered when the ground is worked there. The addition was constructed· about 1882 and the brick construction, arched lintels above the doors and windows, and high ceilings are typical of the houses constructed by German settlers in Missouri at that time. The conflicting styles of the two parts of the house presented some architectural problems, when nine foot ceilings on the new part lined up with seven foot ceilings on the old part. This was solved by having two steps between the new and old rooms upstairs, but the doorway between has less than five feet of headroom.
