= Augusta Harmonie Verein =

- U.S. National Register of Historic Places
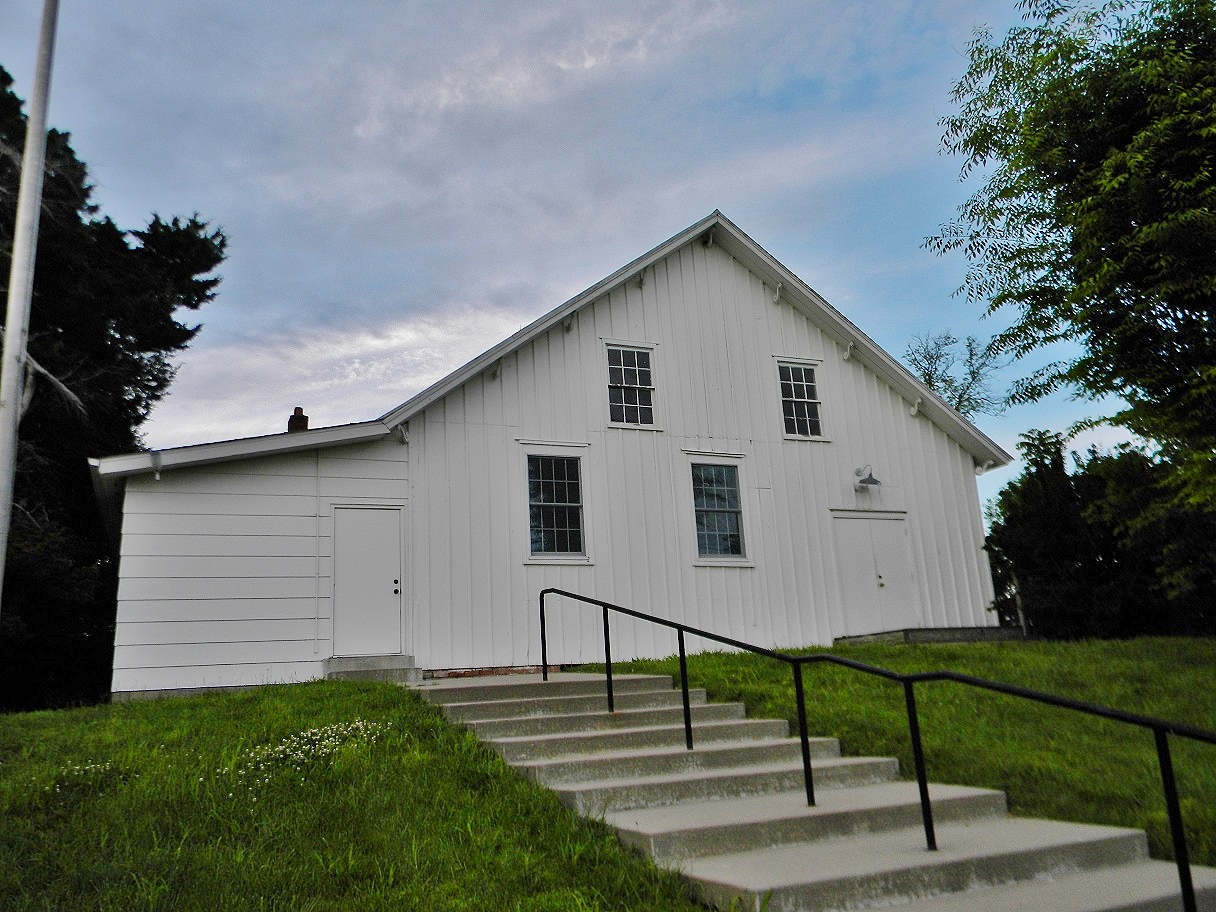
- Augusta Harmonie Verein, May 2016

- Location within Missouri Location within the United States
- Location: Jct. of Hackman and Church Rds., Augusta, Missouri
- Coordinates: 38°34′32″N 90°52′44″W
- Area: 1.5 acres (0.61 ha)
- Built: 1869
- MPS: Augusta MPS
- NRHP reference No.: 94001554
- Added to NRHP: January 20, 1995

Augusta Harmonie Verein, also known as the American Legion Post 262 and Grand Army of the Republic Hall, is a historic clubhouse located at Augusta, St. Charles County, Missouri, United States. It was built in 1869, and is a 1 1/2-story, frame building with board and batten siding. It measures approximately 35 feet wide by 95 feet deep and has a weatherboarded addition built about 1970. Also on the property is a contributing octagonal bandstand constructed about 1890.

It was added to the National Register of Historic Places in 1995.
