= Mindrup House-Store =

Historic house in Missouri, United States

- U.S. National Register of Historic Places
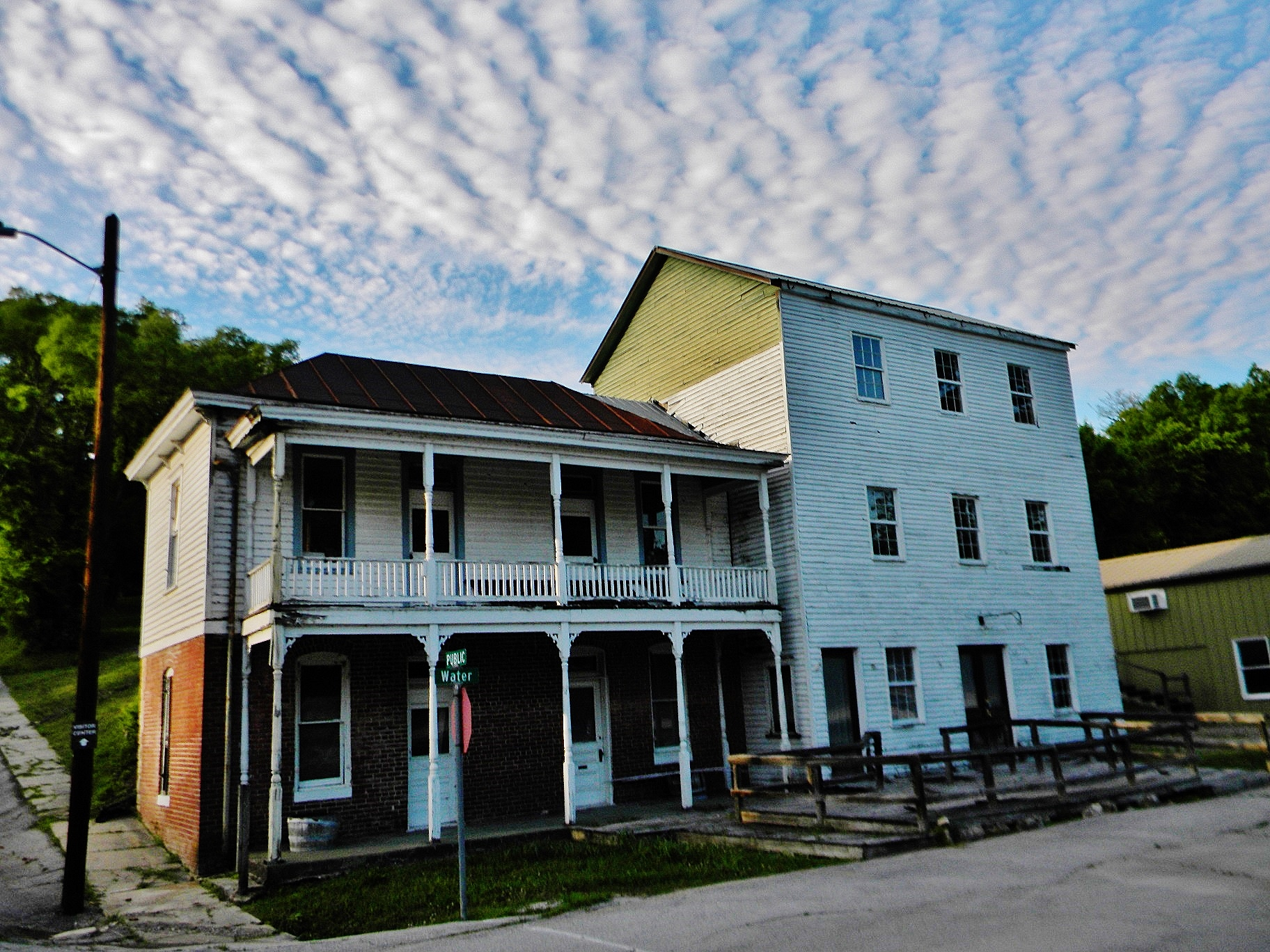
- Mindrup House-Store, May 2016

- Location within Missouri Location within the United States
- Location: 5543 Water St., Augusta, Missouri
- Coordinates: 38°34′13″N 90°53′1″W
- Area: less than one acre
- Built: c. 1860. c. 1890
- MPS: Augusta MPS
- NRHP reference No.: 94001557
- Added to NRHP: January 20, 1995

Mindrup House-Store is a historic home and store located at Augusta, St. Charles County, Missouri. The house was built about 1860, and is a three-story, facchwerk timber frame dwelling. The store occupied the first floor with living quarters above. A two-story brick and frame addition was added about 1890. The addition has a hipped roof and features a two-story gallery porch.

It was added to the National Register of Historic Places in 1995.
