= Charles McLee Farris House =

Historic house in Missouri, United States

- U.S. National Register of Historic Places
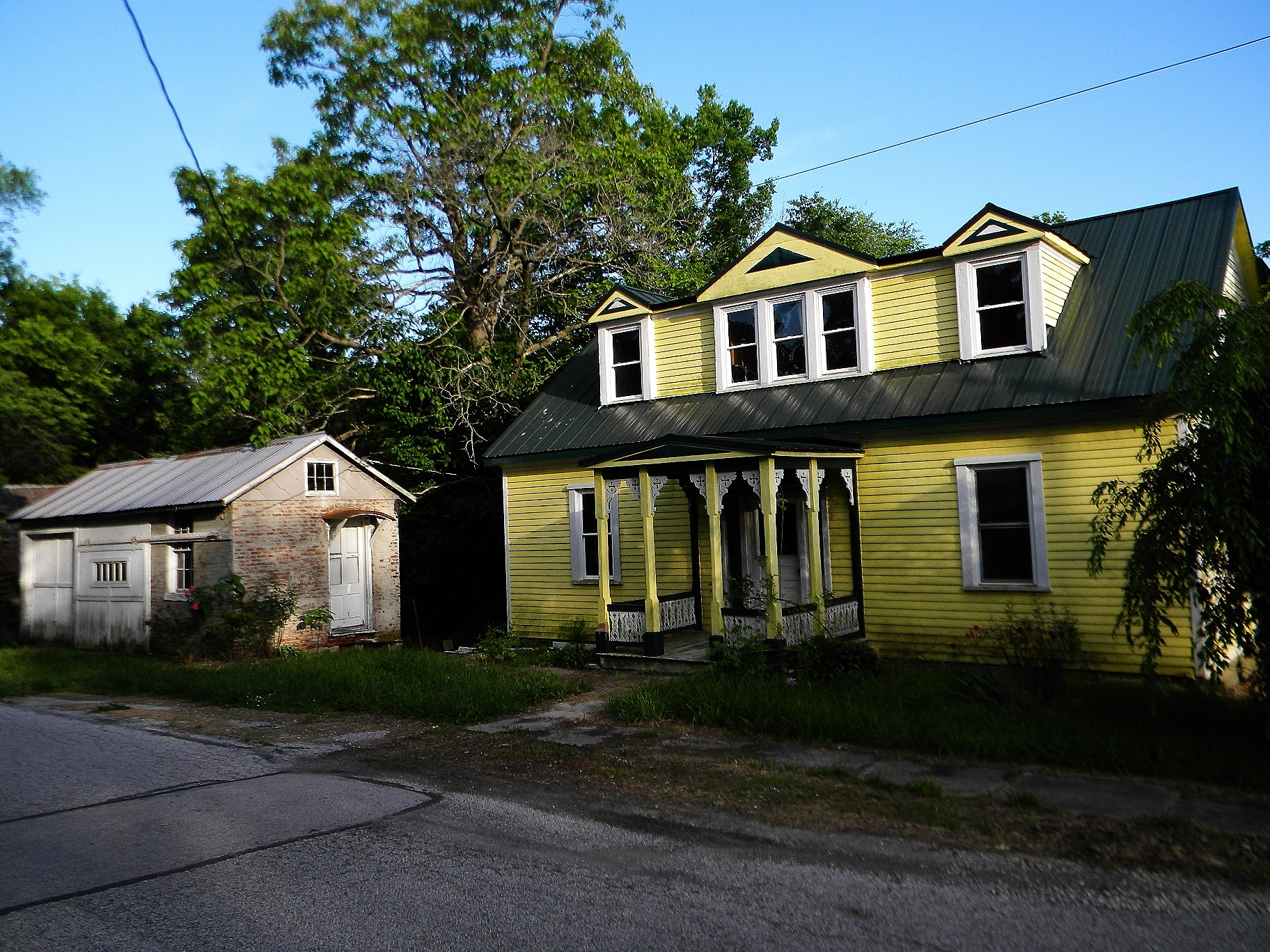
- Charles McLee Farris House, May 2016

- Location within Missouri Location within the United States
- Location: 5517 High St., Augusta, Missouri
- Coordinates: 38°34′18″N 90°52′58″W
- Area: less than one acre
- Built: 1850
- MPS: Augusta MPS
- NRHP reference No.: 94001559
- Added to NRHP: January 20, 1995

Charles McLee Farris House is a historic home located at Augusta, St. Charles County, Missouri. It was built about 1850, and is a 1 1/2-story, three-bay, frame dwelling on a stone foundation and with a saddlebag plan. The house measures approximately 32 feet wide and 30 feet deep. It has a side gable roof with dormer and one-bay front porch.

It was added to the National Register of Historic Places in 1995.
