= Robert Ewich Farmstead =

- U.S. National Register of Historic Places
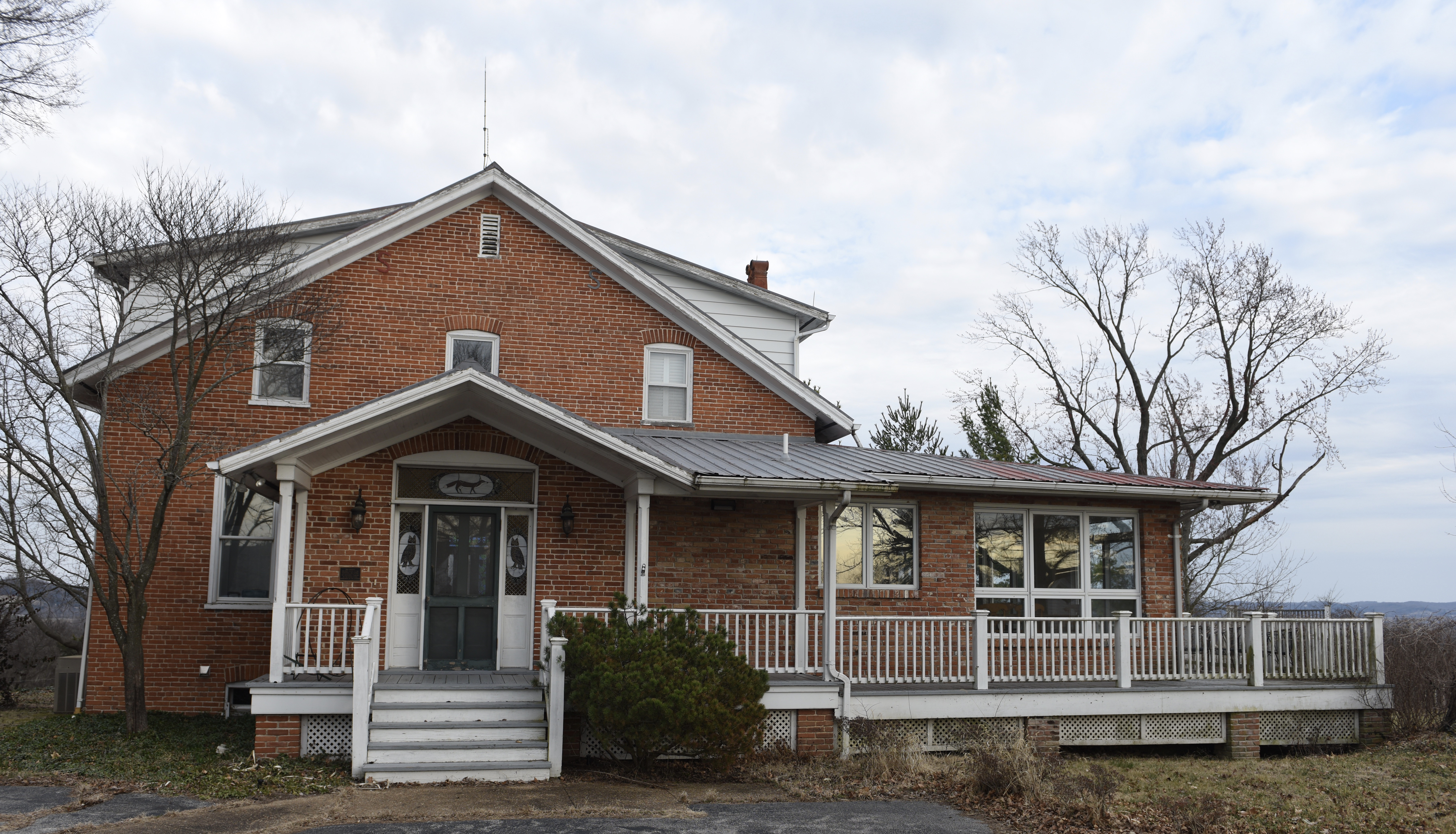

- Location within Missouri Location within the United States
- Location: 5336 Hackman Rd. Augusta, Missouri
- Coordinates: 38°34′30″N 90°52′40″W
- Area: 5 acres (2.0 ha)
- Built: c. 1865
- MPS: Augusta MPS
- NRHP reference No.: 94001556
- Added to NRHP: January 20, 1995

Robert Ewich Farmstead is a historic home and farm located at Augusta, St. Charles County, Missouri. The house was built about 1865, and is a two-story, three-bay, front-gabled, red brick dwelling on a stone foundation. The house measures approximately 35 feet wide and 30 feet deep and has a central-passage plan. Also on the property is a contributing board-and-batten barn dated to about 1865.

It was added to the National Register of Historic Places in 1995.
