= Lindenwood Neighborhood Historic District =

Historic district in Missouri, United States

- U.S. National Register of Historic Places
- U.S. Historic district
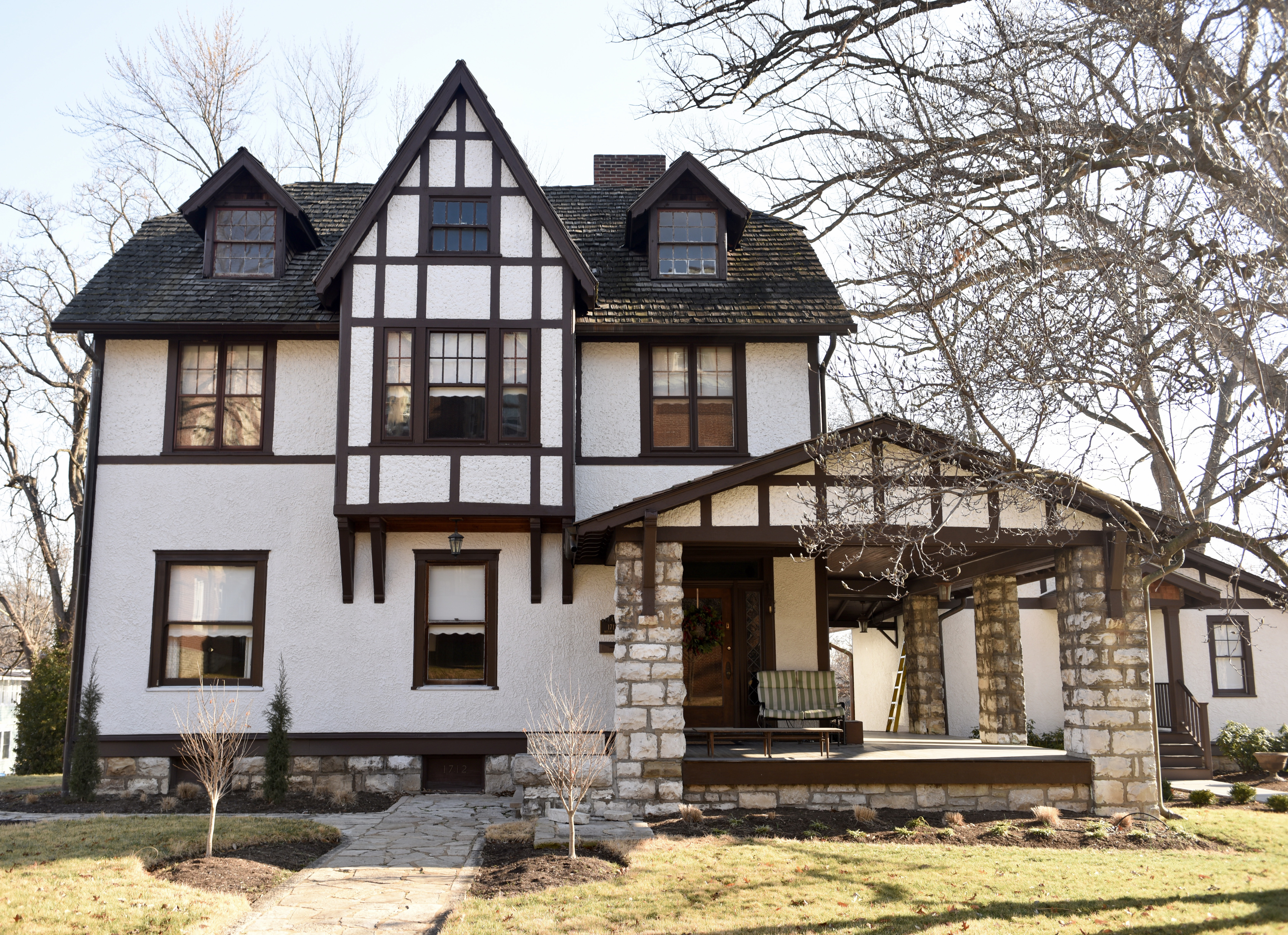

- Location within Missouri Location within the United States
- Location: Roughly bounded by Watson, Gamble, Sibley & Elm Sts. & alley between Houston & N. Kingshighway, St. Charles, Missouri
- Coordinates: 38°47′18″N 90°29′45″W
- Area: 22 acres (8.9 ha)
- Built: 1902
- Built by: Owen, Virgil A.; Yust, William G.; Hindersmith; Richardson, Irving A.; Zerr, Frank A.
- Architect: Lehmann, Arthur E.
- Architectural style: Queen Anne, Folk Victorian, Colonial Revival, Tudor Revival, Mediterranean Revival, Bungalow/Craftsman
- NRHP reference No.: 16000728
- Added to NRHP: October 17, 2016

Lindenwood Neighborhood Historic District is a national historic district located at St. Charles, St. Charles County, Missouri, United States. The district encompasses 108 contributing buildings and 1 contributing site in an exclusively residential section of St. Charles. It developed between about 1902 and 1956, and includes representative examples of Queen Anne, Folk Victorian, Colonial Revival, Tudor Revival, Mediterranean Revival, and Bungalow / American Craftsman style architecture.

It was added to the National Register of Historic Places in 2016.
