= New Melle, Missouri =

- City
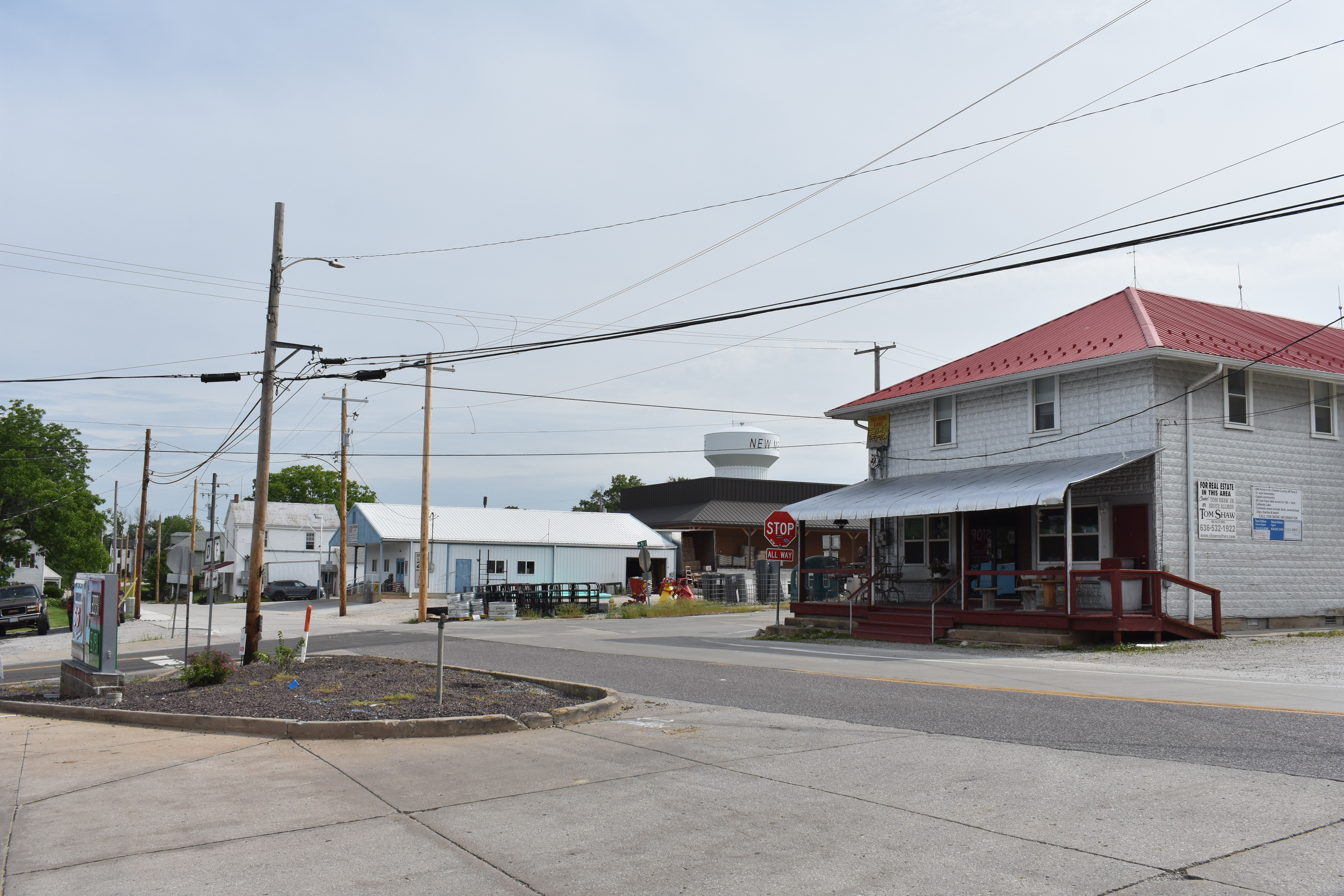

- Location of New Melle, Missouri
- Coordinates: 38°42′48″N 90°52′36″W
- Country: United States
- State: Missouri
- County: St. Charles

Government
  - Mayor: Steve Burt

Area
  - Total: 1.72 sq mi (4.46 km^{2})
  - Land: 1.68 sq mi (4.36 km^{2})
  - Water: 0.039 sq mi (0.10 km^{2})
- Elevation: 751 ft (229 m)

Population (2020)
  - Total: 541
  - Density: 321.5/sq mi (124.13/km^{2})
- Time zone: UTC-6 (Central (CST))
  - Summer (DST): UTC-5 (CDT)
- FIPS code: 29-52148
- GNIS feature ID: 2395209
- Website: www.cityofnewmelle.com

New Melle (/ˈmɛli/ MEL-ee) is a small city in St. Charles County, Missouri, United States. It is located approximately 38 miles west of St. Louis. As of the 2020 census, New Melle had a population of 541.

== History ==
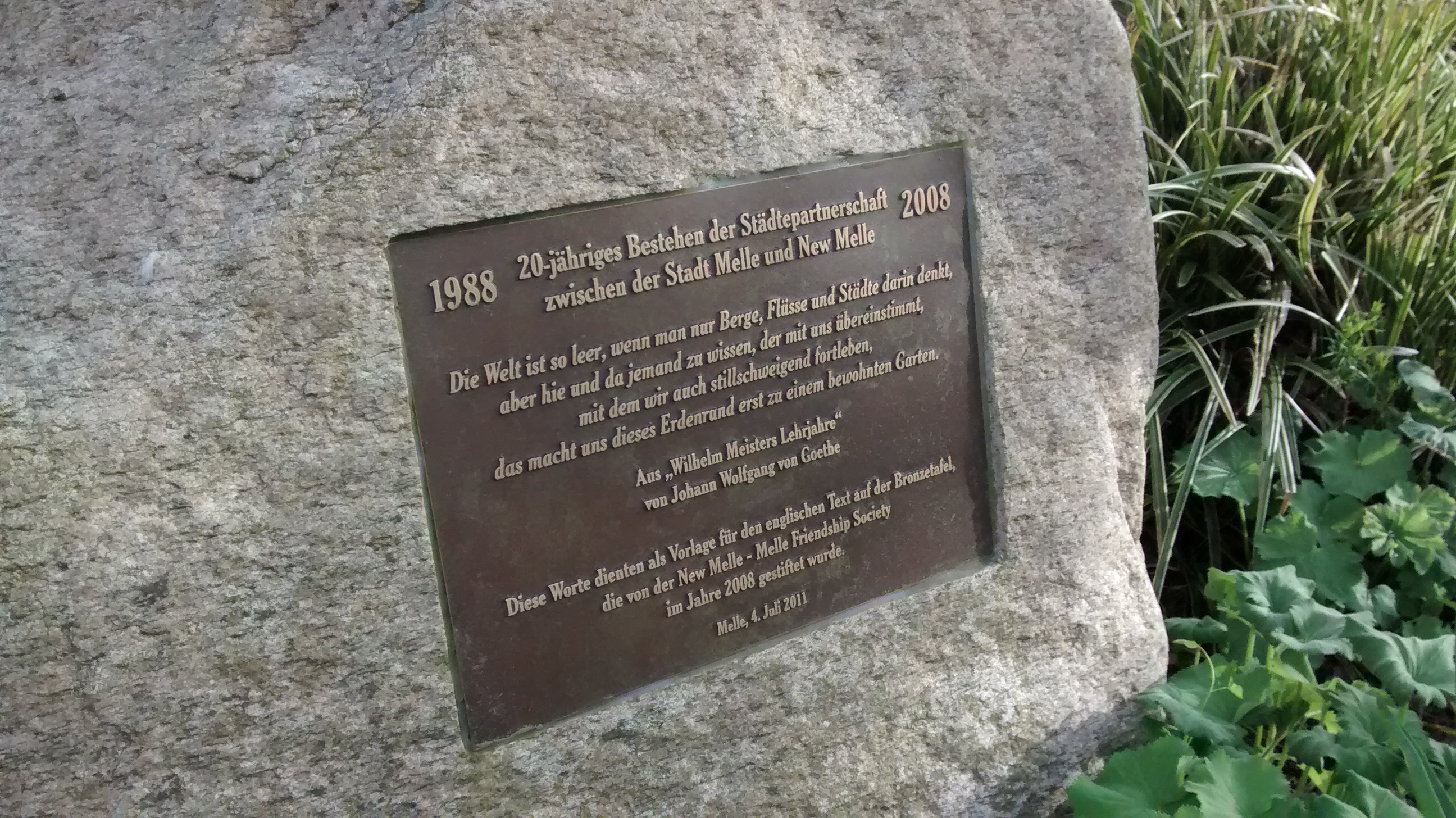
New Melle memorial stone

New Melle was platted ca. 1850. The community was named after Melle, Germany, the former home of a share of the first settlers, who came in 1839. The city's first Lutheran church, St. Paul Lutheran Church, was established in 1844. A post office called New Melle has been in operation since 1850. New Melle incorporated as a city in 1978.

The Meier General Store and St. Paul's Church are listed on the National Register of Historic Places.

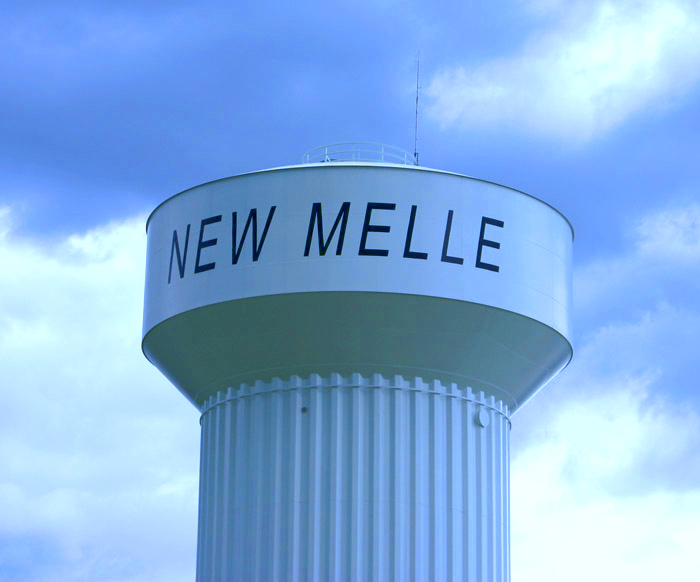
The water tower of the city of New Melle, Missouri

== Geography ==
According to the United States Census Bureau, the city has a total area of 1.61 square miles (4.17 km^{2}), of which 1.57 square miles (4.07 km^{2}) is land and 0.04 square miles (0.10 km^{2}) is water.

== Demographics ==
Historical population
Census	Pop.	Note	%±
1880	264		—
1980	168		—
1990	486		189.3%
2000	124		−74.5%
2010	475		283.1%
2020	541		13.9%
U.S. Decennial Census

=== 2010 census ===
As of the census of 2010, there were 475 people, 179 households, and 143 families living in the city. The population density was 302.5 inhabitants per square mile (116.8/km^{2}). There were 195 housing units at an average density of 124.2 per square mile (48.0/km^{2}). The racial makeup of the city was 97.3% White, 0.6% African American, 0.8% Asian, 0.2% Pacific Islander, and 1.1% from other races. Hispanic or Latino of any race were 2.3% of the population.

There were 179 households, of which 30.2% had children under the age of 18 living with them, 74.3% were married couples living together, 2.8% had a female householder with no husband present, 2.8% had a male householder with no wife present, and 20.1% were non-families. 17.3% of all households were made up of individuals, and 10.6% had someone living alone who was 65 years of age or older. The average household size was 2.65 and the average family size was 3.01.

The median age in the city was 47.1 years. 23.2% of residents were under the age of 18; 4.1% were between the ages of 18 and 24; 20.1% were from 25 to 44; 30.1% were from 45 to 64; and 22.3% were 65 years of age or older. The gender makeup of the city was 48.6% male and 51.4% female.

=== 2000 census ===
As of the census of 2000, there were 124 people, 44 households, and 35 families living in the city. The population density was 349.8 inhabitants per square mile (135.1/km^{2}). There were 49 housing units at an average density of 138.2 per square mile (53.4/km^{2}). The racial makeup of the city was 98.39% White and 1.61% African American.

There were 44 households, out of which 31.8% had children under the age of 18 living with them, 72.7% were married couples living together, 9.1% had a female householder with no husband present, and 18.2% were non-families. 15.9% of all households were made up of individuals, and 9.1% had someone living alone who was 65 years of age or older. The average household size was 2.82 and the average family size was 3.17.

In the city the population was spread out, with 25.8% under the age of 18, 4.0% from 18 to 24, 26.6% from 25 to 44, 31.5% from 45 to 64, and 12.1% who were 65 years of age or older. The median age was 41 years. For every 100 females there were 93.8 males. For every 100 females age 18 and over, there were 80.4 males.

The median income for a household in the city was $55,417, and the median income for a family was $67,917. Males had a median income of $51,250 versus. $24,167 for females. The per capita income for the city was $29,965. There were no families and 3.1% of the population living below the poverty line, including no under eighteens and none of those over 64.

== Education ==
Almost all of New Melle is in the Francis Howell School District. Elementary school students attend Daniel Boone Elementary, middle school students attend Francis Howell Middle School, and high school students attend Francis Howell High School.

A small piece is in the Wentzville R-IV School District.

New Melle has a public library, a branch of the St. Charles City-County District Library. It has a Wentzville address, but is in New Melle.
