= Meier General Store =

- U.S. National Register of Historic Places
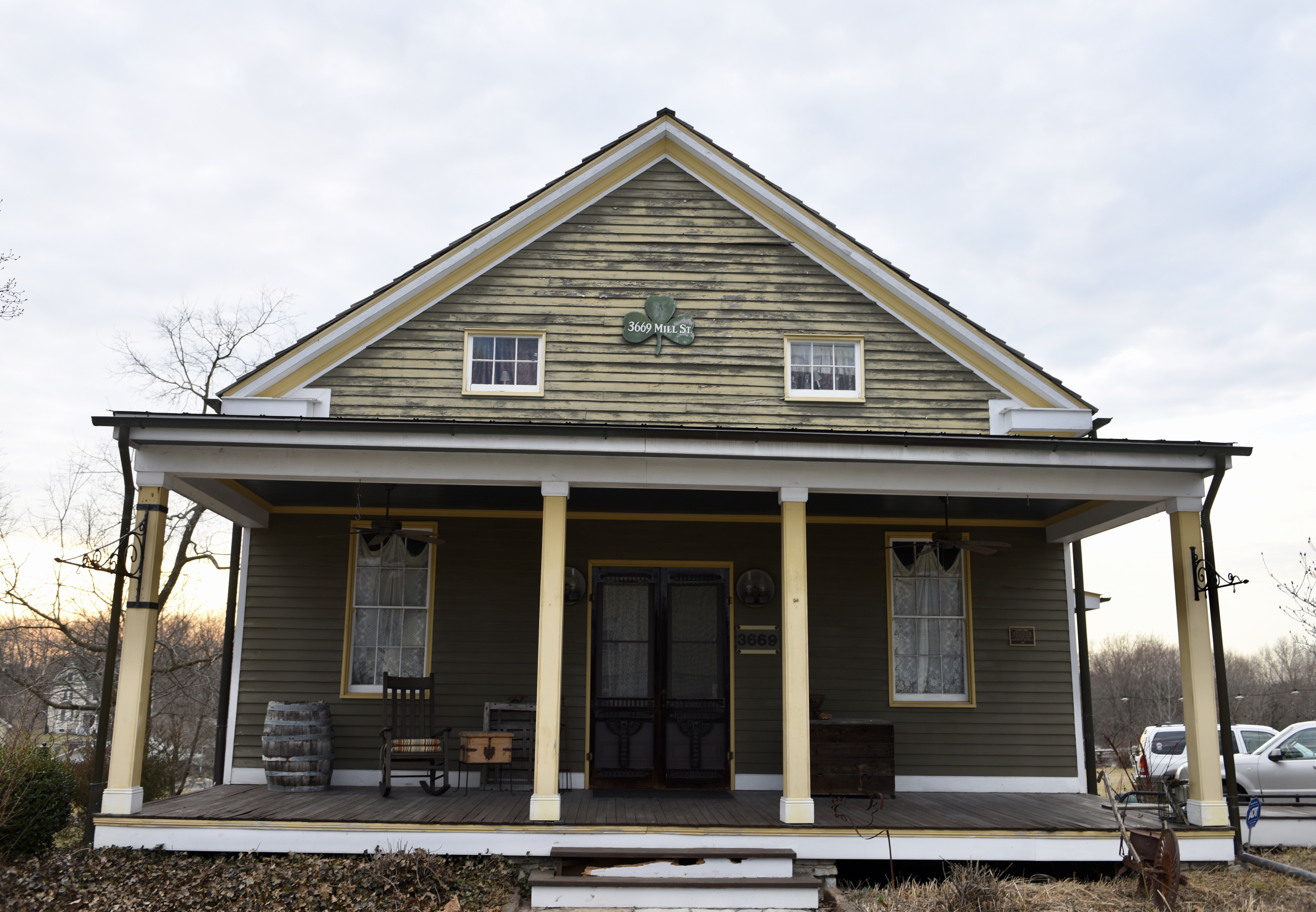

- Location within Missouri Location within the United States
- Location: 3669 Mill St. New Melle, Missouri
- Coordinates: 38°42′43″N 90°52′47″W
- Area: less than one acre
- Architectural style: Gable front store
- NRHP reference No.: 02000794
- Added to NRHP: July 12, 2002

Meier General Store, also known as Butler Bros. Grocer Co., is a historic general store located at New Melle, St. Charles County, Missouri. It was built about 1857, and is a one-story, gable front frame building. It sits on a stone foundation and is sheathed in weatherboard.

It was listed on the National Register of Historic Places in 2002.
