= Midtown Neighborhood Historic District =

Historic district in Missouri, United States

- U.S. National Register of Historic Places
- U.S. Historic district
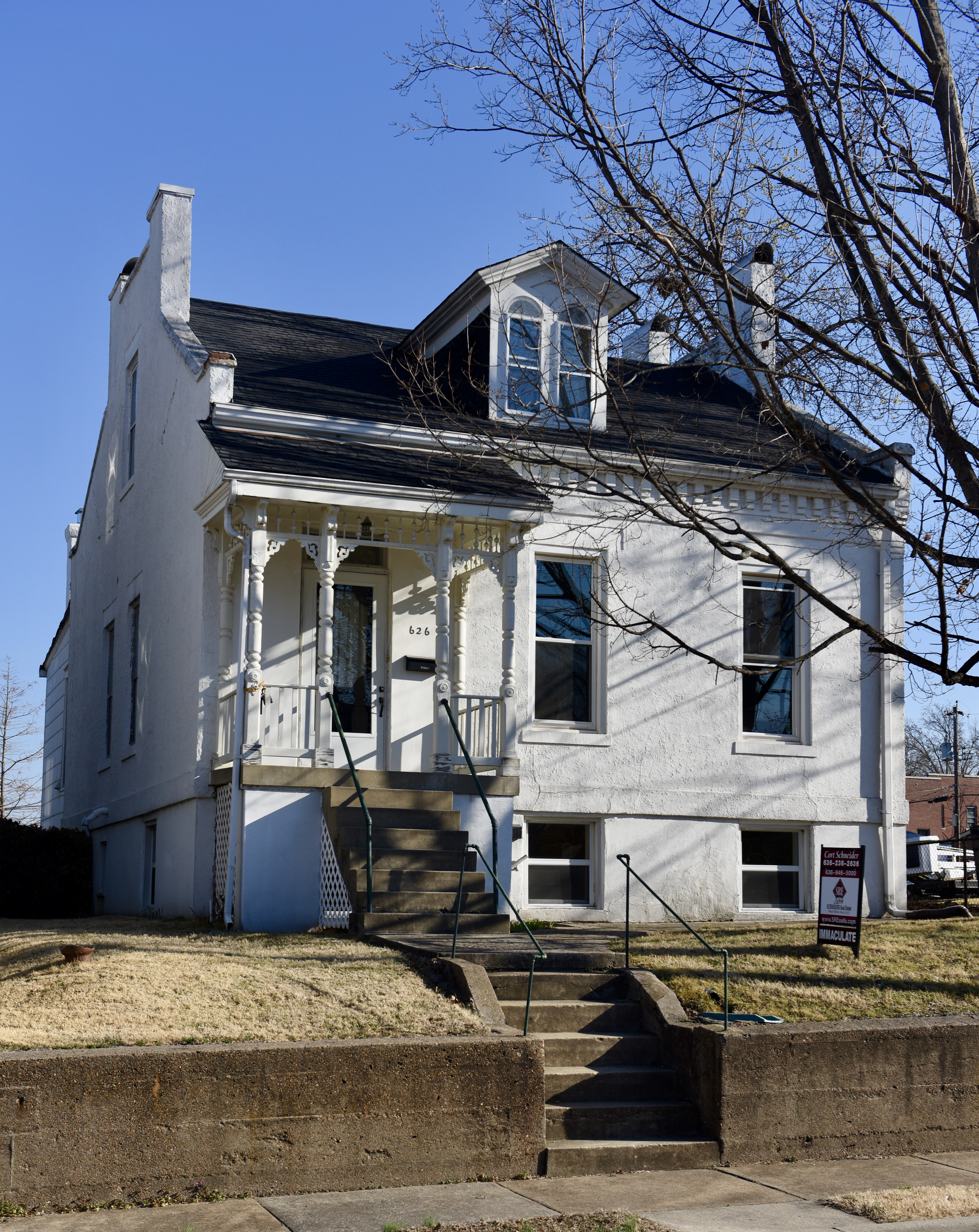

- Location within Missouri Location within the United States
- Location: Roughly bounded by Clark, Madison, Jefferson, Kingshighway, 2nd & 3rd Sts., St. Charles, Missouri
- Coordinates: 38°47′00″N 90°29′00″W
- Area: 125.4 acres (50.7 ha)
- Built: 1838
- Architect: Legg, Jerome; Pelligreen, Nicholas; Thompson, J.W.; Stumberg, Johann Heinrich; et al.
- Architectural style: Federal, Greek Revival, Gothic Revival, Italianate, Queen Anne, Romanesque, Folk Victorian, Colonial Revival, Classical Revival, Tudor Revival, Bungalow/Craftsman
- NRHP reference No.: 14000885
- Added to NRHP: October 29, 2014

The Midtown Neighborhood Historic District is a national historic district located at St. Charles, St. Charles County, Missouri. The district encompasses 527 contributing buildings, 7 contributing sites, and 5 contributing objects in a predominantly residential section of St. Charles. It developed between about 1838 and 1959 and includes representative examples of Federal, Greek Revival, Gothic Revival, Italianate, Queen Anne, Romanesque Revival, Folk Victorian, Colonial Revival, Classical Revival, Tudor Revival, and Bungalow/American Craftsman style architecture. Located in the district are the separately listed African Church and Oliver L. and Catherine Link House. Other notable buildings include the St. Charles County Courthouse, Benton School (1896), St. John's A.M.E. Church (1872), Immanuel Lutheran Church (1867), Jefferson Street Presbyterian Church, Fourth Street Market Grocery (1926-1927), West End Grocery and Meat Market (c. 1900), Dr. Ludwell Powell House (1838), Rogers-Ehrhard House (1856, 1866), Waye Monument Company and Residence (1889), Meyer House, Kaemmerlen House, and Elsner House.

It was added to the National Register of Historic Places in 2014.
