= Samuel Stewart Watson House =

Historic house in Missouri, United States

- U.S. National Register of Historic Places
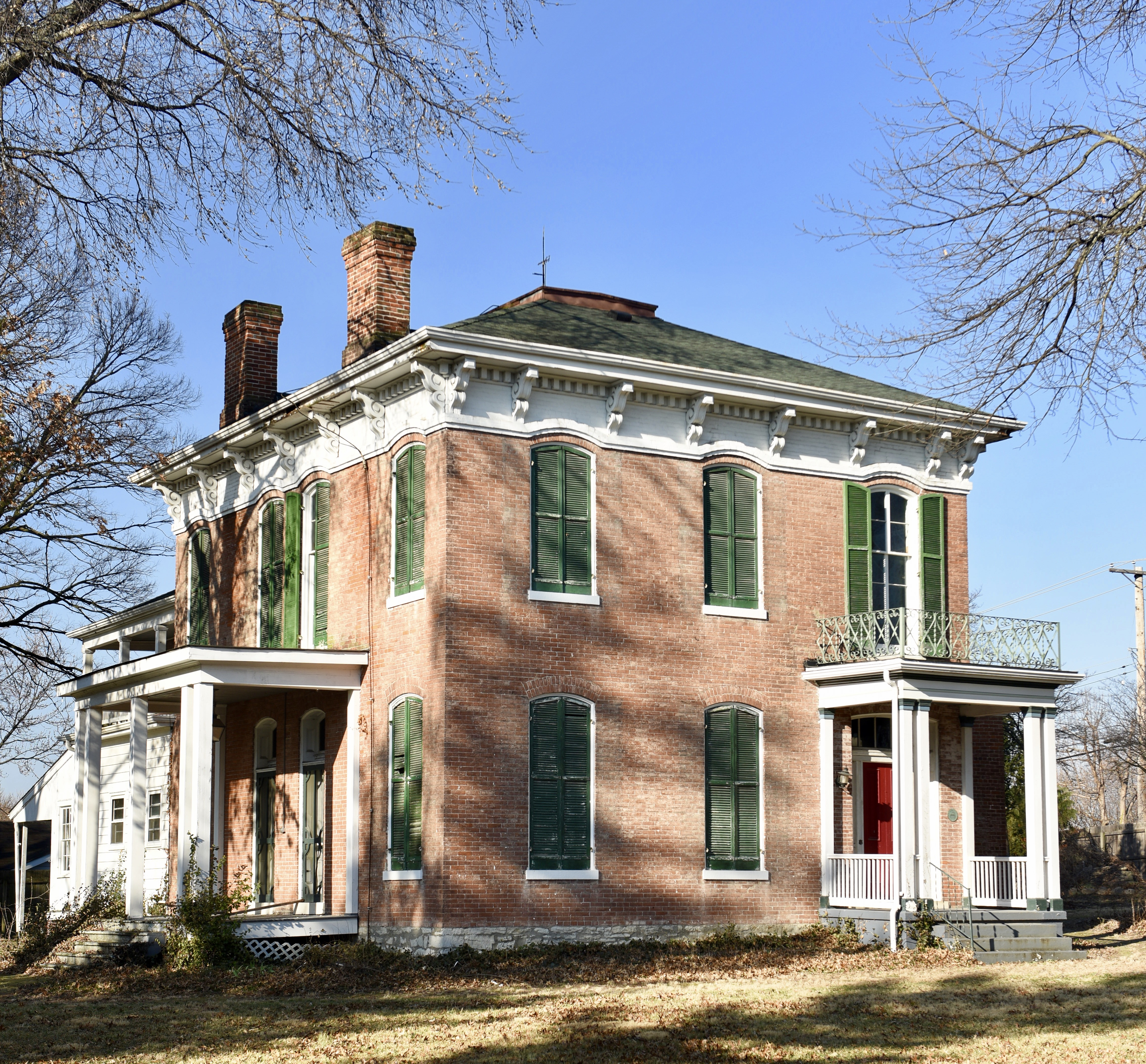

- Location within Missouri Location within the United States
- Location: 205 S. Duchesne Dr. St. Charles, Missouri
- Coordinates: 38°47′39″N 90°30′16″W
- Area: less than one acre
- Built: 1859
- Architectural style: Italianate
- NRHP reference No.: 82004714
- Added to NRHP: September 23, 1982

Samuel Stewart Watson House, also known as Ermeling House, is a historic home located at St. Charles, St. Charles County, Missouri. It was built in 1859, and is a two-story, Italianate style brick dwelling with a hipped roof. It features a broad denticulated cornice with heavy brackets, segmentally arched windows, and a classically inspired portico.

It was added to the National Register of Historic Places in 1982.
