= Oliver L. and Catherine Link House =

Historic house in Missouri, United States

- U.S. National Register of Historic Places
- U.S. Historic district – Contributing property
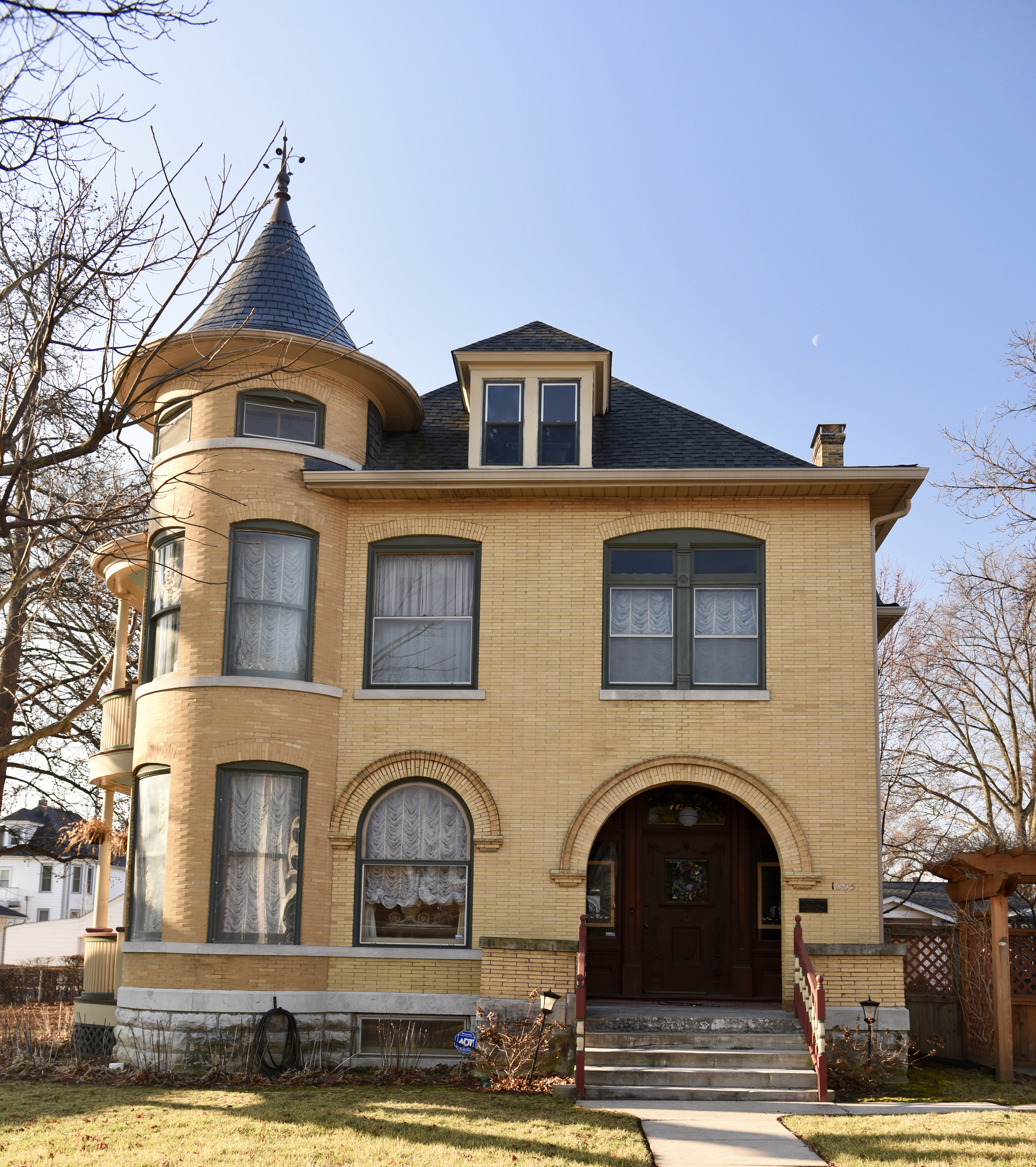

- Location within Missouri Location within the United States
- Location: 1005 Jefferson; St. Charles, Missouri
- Coordinates: 38°47′05″N 90°29′35″W
- Area: less than one acre
- Built: 1895
- Built by: Link, Oliver L.
- Architectural style: Richardsonian Romanesque
- NRHP reference No.: 13000584
- Added to NRHP: August 6, 2013

Oliver L. and Catherine Link House is a historic home located at St. Charles, St. Charles County, Missouri. It was built in 1895, and is a 2 1/2-story, Richardsonian Romanesque style yellow brick dwelling on a raised basement. It has a hipped roof with cross gables and features a round tower with a conical roof and large round arched opening over the entryway.

It was added to the National Register of Historic Places in 2013. It is located in the Midtown Neighborhood Historic District.
