= Becker House =

Historic house in Ohio, United States

- U.S. National Register of Historic Places
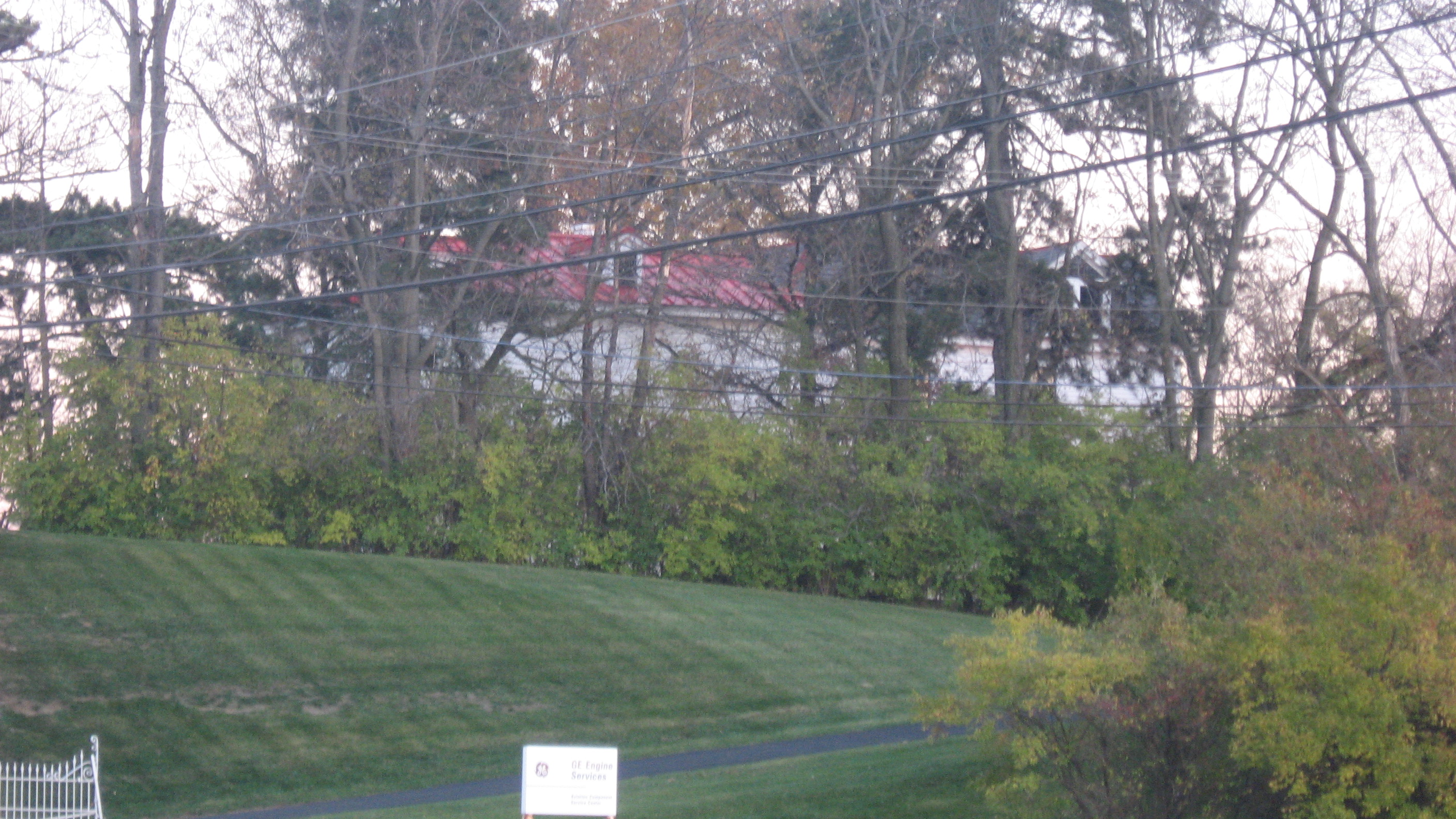
- View through the trees

- Location within Ohio Location within the United States
- Location: 179 W. Crescentville Rd., Springdale, Ohio
- Coordinates: 39°18′6″N 84°28′29″W
- Area: 3.6 acres (1.5 ha)
- Built: 1830
- Architect: Joseph Hough
- NRHP reference No.: 74001522
- Added to NRHP: July 18, 1974

The Becker House is a historic house on the outskirts of the city of Springdale, Ohio, United States. Constructed in 1830 as a farmhouse, it was for a time home to a prominent figure in the national debate over slavery. Few changes have been made to the house since its earliest years, warranting its designation as a historic site.

In 1830, Joseph Hough decided to erect a residence on his 63-acre (0.25-km^{2}) property; the finished residence was typical of farmhouses built in the area at the time. His design consisted of a simple two-story structure with weatherboarded walls. Its facade is divided into three bays, with a porch sheltering the entire first floor. Hough owned the property until his death in the early 1850s; the probate process following his death resulted in the property's conveyance to John Burgoyne, Jr. Burgoyne's father, John Burgoyne, Sr., lived at the house from 1860 until 1864, following an incident in which he had suddenly gained a leading position in the national slavery debate: while serving as a judge of the common pleas court for Hamilton County, the elder man ruled that the Fugitive Slave Act of 1850 was unconstitutional during a case that had already attracted national attention.

In 1974, the Becker House was listed on the National Register of Historic Places, qualifying on the basis of its historic architecture; it is Springdale's only federally-designated historic site. It was deemed worthy of inclusion as a well-preserved example of a mid-century farmstead, and its fine structural condition was expected to ensure its intact survival for many years into the future.
