= Brinkerhoff–Becker House =

Historic house in Michigan, United States

- U.S. National Register of Historic Places
- Michigan State Historic Site
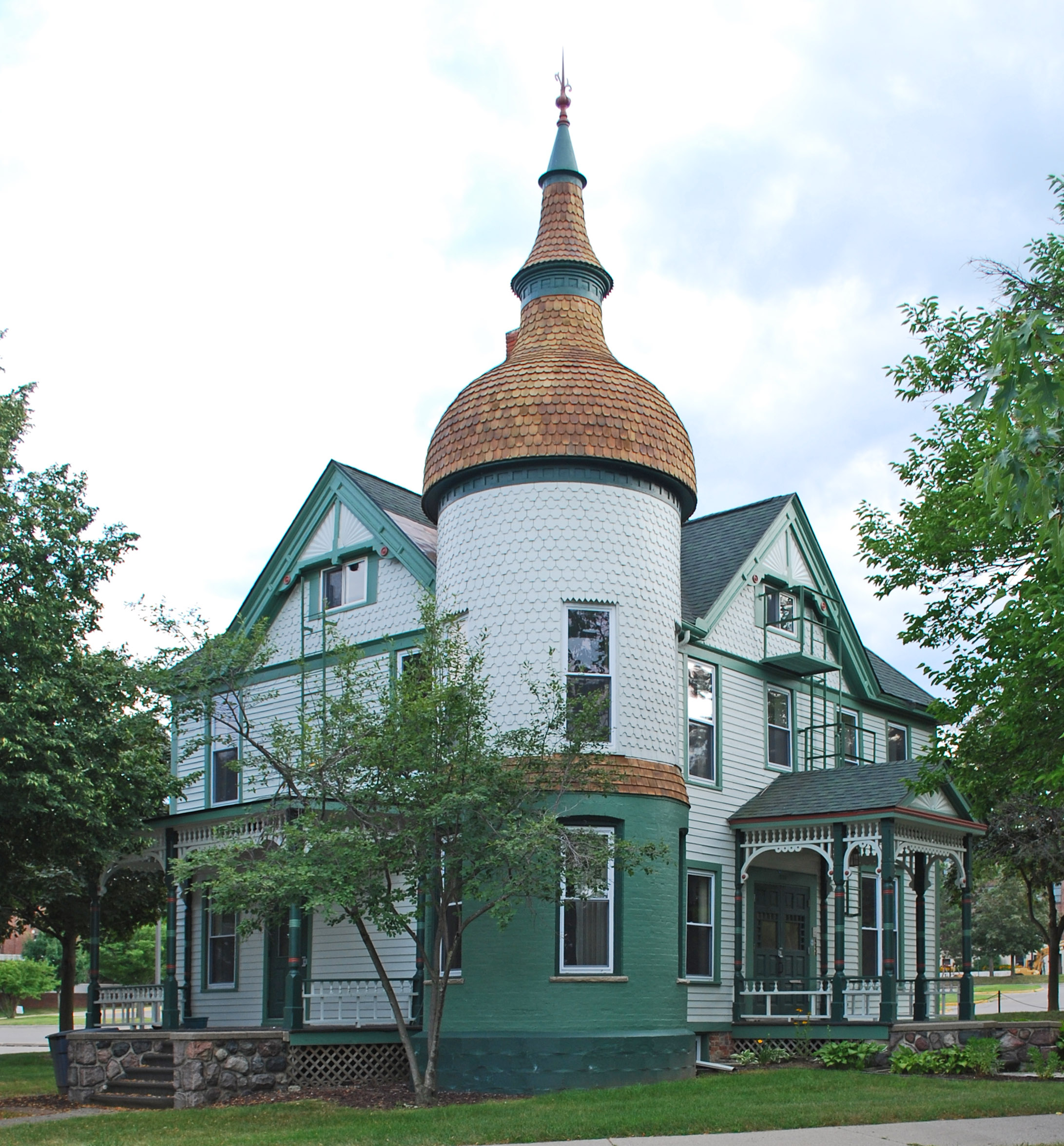

- Location within Michigan Location within the United States
- Interactive map
- Location: 601 W. Forest Ave., Ypsilanti, Michigan
- Coordinates: 42°14′51″N 83°37′15″W
- Area: less than one acre
- Built: 1863
- Architectural style: Queen Anne
- NRHP reference No.: 82002890

Significant dates
- Added to NRHP: July 8, 1982
- Designated MSHS: August 12, 1977

The Brinkerhoff–Becker House, also known as the Becker–Stachlewitz House, was built as a private home, and is located at 601 West Forest Avenue Ypsilanti, Michigan. It was designated a Michigan State Historic Site in 1977 and listed on the National Register of Historic Places in 1982.

== History ==
The Brinkerhoff–Becker House was built in 1863–69, likely for Hezekiah H. Brinkerhoff, an insurance and real estate agent. The Brinkerhoffs lived in the house until Hezekiah's death in 1885; his widow and Sarah E. Brinkerhoff, continued to own the property until 1890. It was eventually purchased by J. M. B. Sill, one of the early Principals of the Michigan State Normal School (now Eastern Michigan University). Charles J. Becker purchased the house in 1891 and remodeled it to include the prominent tower. The Becker family lived there until approximately 1918. It was later remodeled into apartments.

The house is currently owned by Eastern Michigan University and is split into four apartments.

== Description ==
The Brinkerhoff–Becker House is a 2 1/2-story square-frame Queen Anne structure covered with clapboard on a fieldstone foundation. It has a hip roof with prominent shingled gables on the front, side and rear that all display sunburst-pattern gable ornaments and paneled vergeboards. Porches cover entrances on two sides, and display turned posts and decorative spindlework bands across the tops. The house's most recognizable architectural feature is the round tower at the corner. The tower has a brick lower story, an upper story clad in cove-butt shingling, and a "helmet dome" roof clad in octagon-butt, wood shingling.
