= August Sehrt House =

Historic house in Missouri, United States

- U.S. National Register of Historic Places
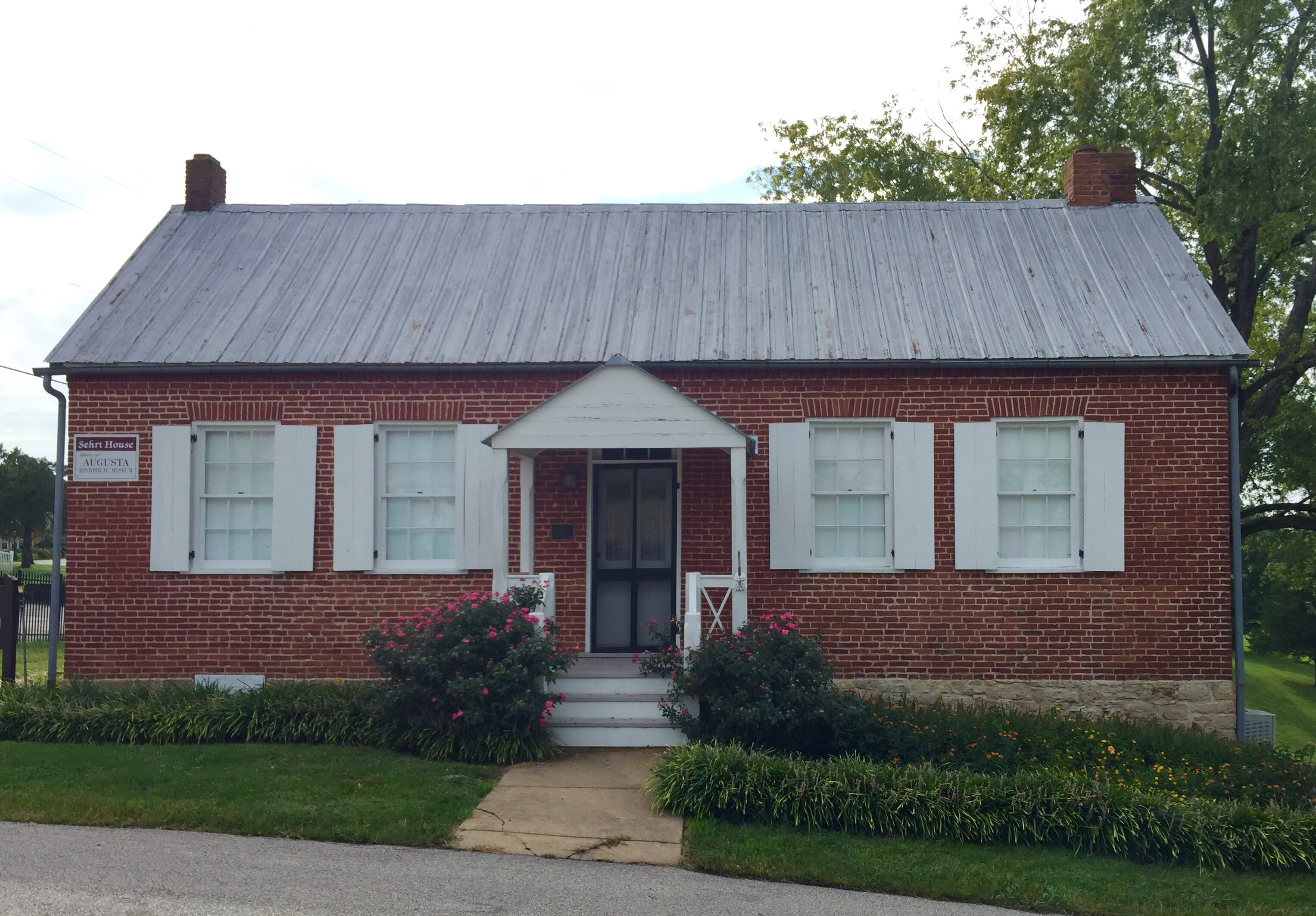
- August Sehrt House, May 2016

- Location within Missouri Location within the United States
- Location: 275 Webster St., Augusta, Missouri
- Coordinates: 38°34′17″N 90°53′9″W
- Area: 8.6 acres (3.5 ha)
- Built: c. 1860
- MPS: Augusta MPS
- NRHP reference No.: 94001143
- Added to NRHP: September 29, 1994

The August Sehrt House is a historic home located at Augusta, St. Charles County, Missouri. It was built about 1860 by German immigrant, August Sehrt. He came to America in 1848 with several family members, including his brother, Julius Sehrt who went on to become the most extensive land owner in St. Charles, MO. It is a 1 1/2-story, five-bay, brick dwelling on a stone foundation and with a side-gable roof. The building houses the Augusta History Museum.

The August Sehrt House was added to the National Register of Historic Places in 1994.
