= St. Paul's Church (New Melle, Missouri) =

Historic church in Missouri, United States

- U.S. National Register of Historic Places
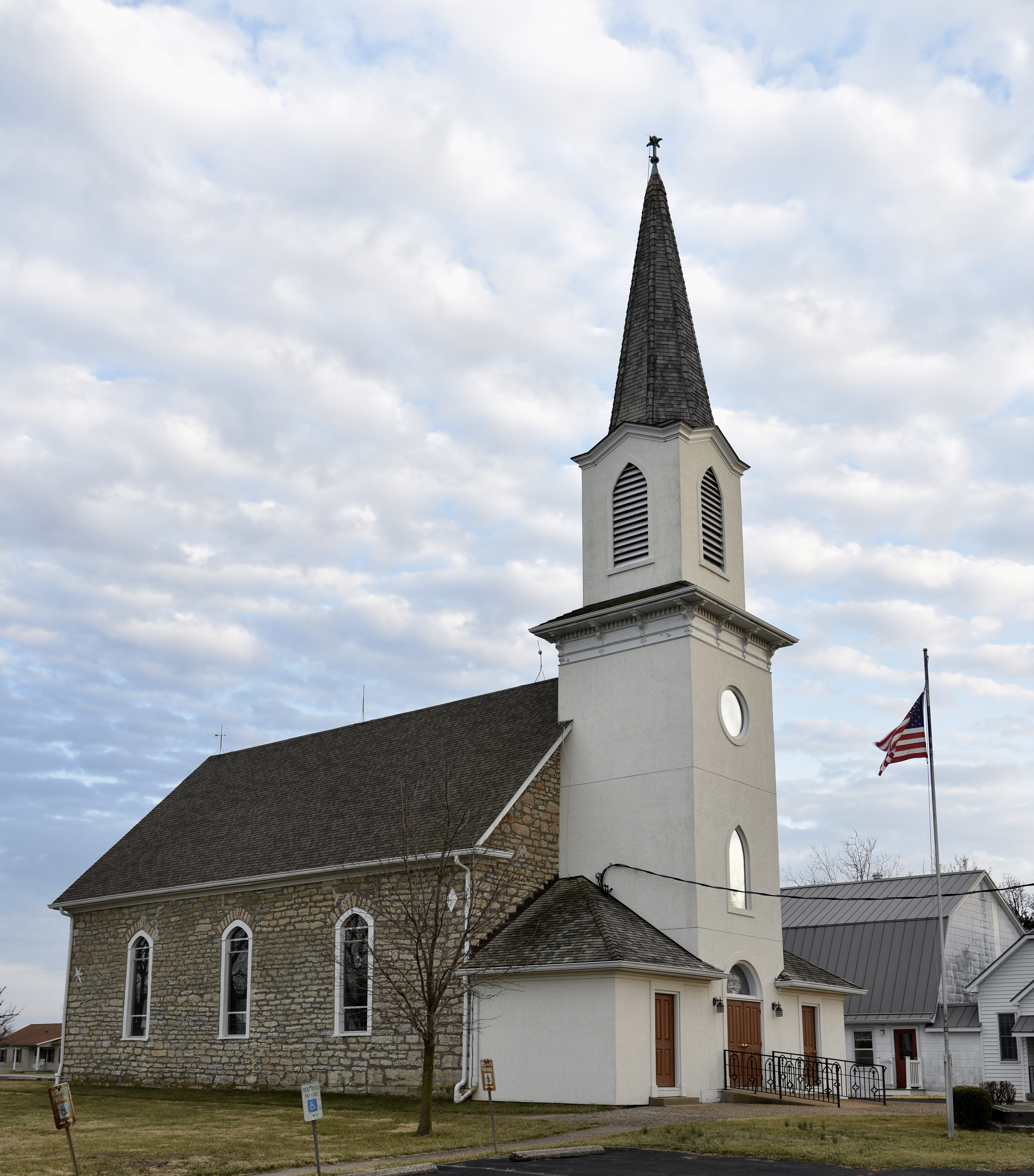

- Location within Missouri Location within the United States
- Location: SR D New Melle, Missouri
- Coordinates: 38°42′31″N 90°52′56″W
- Area: 3.1 acres (1.3 ha)
- Built: 1860, 1881
- Architect: Schlottmann, A. Carl
- Website: https://www.stpaulsnewmelle.com/
- NRHP reference No.: 82004713
- Added to NRHP: September 09, 1982

St. Paul's Church, also known as St. Paul's Lutheran Church and Day School and St. Peter's Lutheran, is a historic Lutheran church located at New Melle, St. Charles County, Missouri. It was built in 1860 by A. Carl Schlottmann and is a one-story rectangular limestone rubble block building on a limestone rubble foundation. It features a projecting bell tower added in 1881. St. Paul's Lutheran Church was founded by German immigrants in 1844 and was the first Lutheran Church in St. Charles County.

The property was listed on the National Register of Historic Places in 1982.
