= State Street AME Zion Church =

Historic church in Alabama, United States

- U.S. National Register of Historic Places
- Alabama Register of Landmarks and Heritage
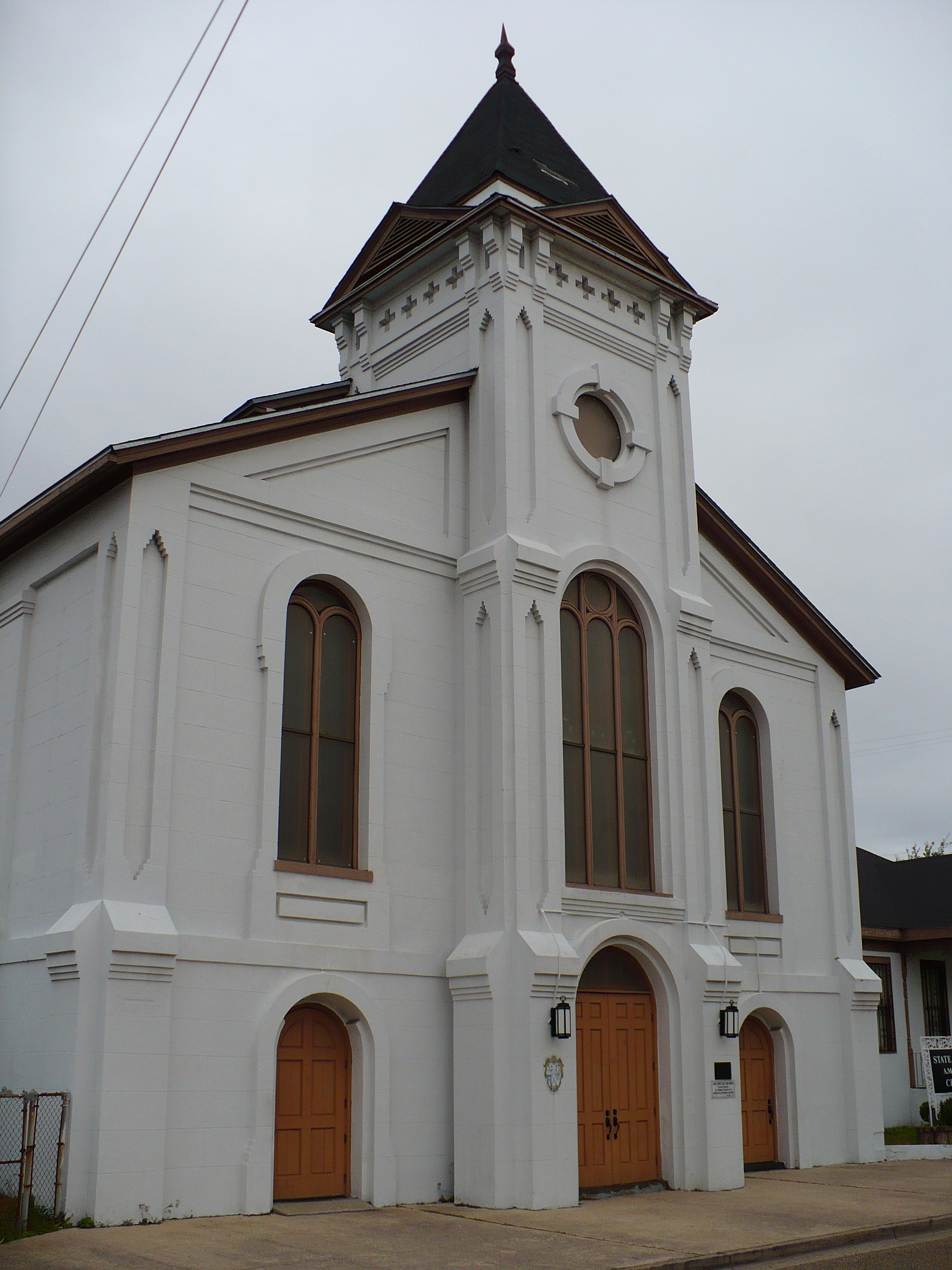
- State Street AME Zion Church in 2009

- Location within Mobile, Alabama Location within Alabama Location within the United States
- Location: 502 State Street; Mobile, Alabama, United States
- Coordinates: 30°41′38″N 88°3′1″W
- Built: 1854
- Architectural style: Romanesque
- NRHP reference No.: 78000505

Significant dates
- Added to NRHP: September 06, 1978
- Designated ARLH: October 20, 1977

State Street African Methodist Episcopal Zion Church is a historic African American church in Mobile, Alabama. It is the oldest documented Methodist church building in Alabama. It is also one of two African American churches founded in the Methodist tradition in Mobile prior to the American Civil War.

== History ==
The church was founded in 1829 as the African Church of the City of Mobile, a mission of the Methodist Episcopal Church South. The original building burned and the current building was erected in 1854. By 1855 the church had a congregation of 550 members, making it one of the most successful African American churches in Alabama. Following the Civil War, the congregation joined the African Methodist Episcopal Zion Church. The Methodist Episcopal Church South then challenged the right of the congregation to occupy the building. Under the leadership of their second minister, Wilbur G. Strong, the congregation obtained legal title to the building in 1872. It was added to the National Register of Historic Places on September 6, 1978, due to its architectural and historic significance.
