= Dr. John H. Stumberg House =

Historic house in Missouri, United States

- U.S. National Register of Historic Places
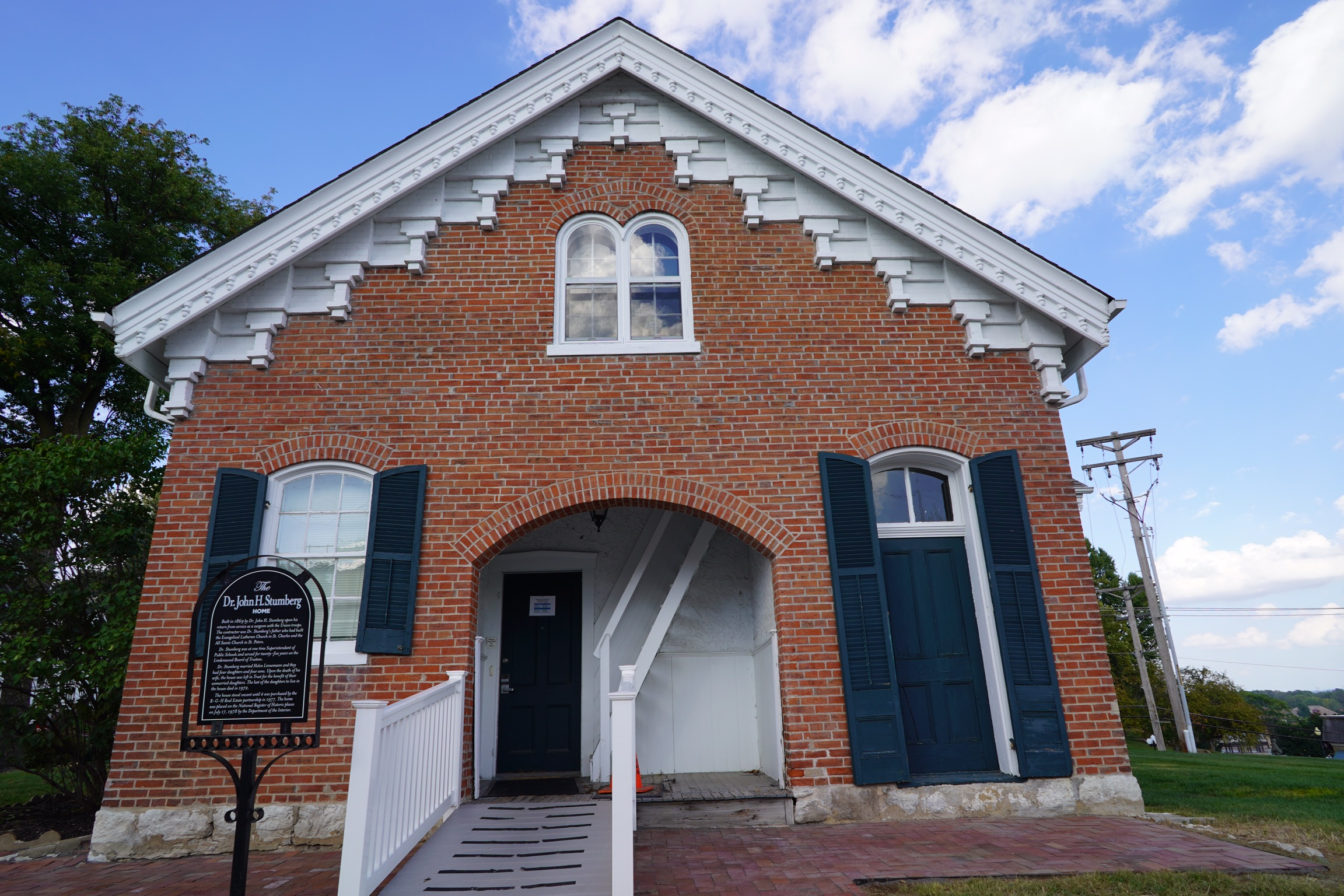

- Location within Missouri Location within the United States
- Location: 100 S. 3rd St. St. Charles, Missouri
- Coordinates: 38°46′53″N 90°29′0″W
- Area: 1.1 acres (0.45 ha)
- Built: 1869-1870
- Built by: Stumberg, Dr. John H.
- NRHP reference No.: 78003132
- Added to NRHP: July 12, 1978

Dr. John H. Stumberg House is a historic home located at St. Charles, St. Charles County, Missouri, United States. It was built in 1869–1870, and is a two-story, "T"-plan, red brick dwelling on a stone foundation. It has a cross-gable roof with dormers and decorated cornice.

The second story was used as an office for the US air force in 1942.

It was added to the National Register of Historic Places in 1978.
