= Marten-Becker House =

Historic house in Missouri, United States

- U.S. National Register of Historic Places
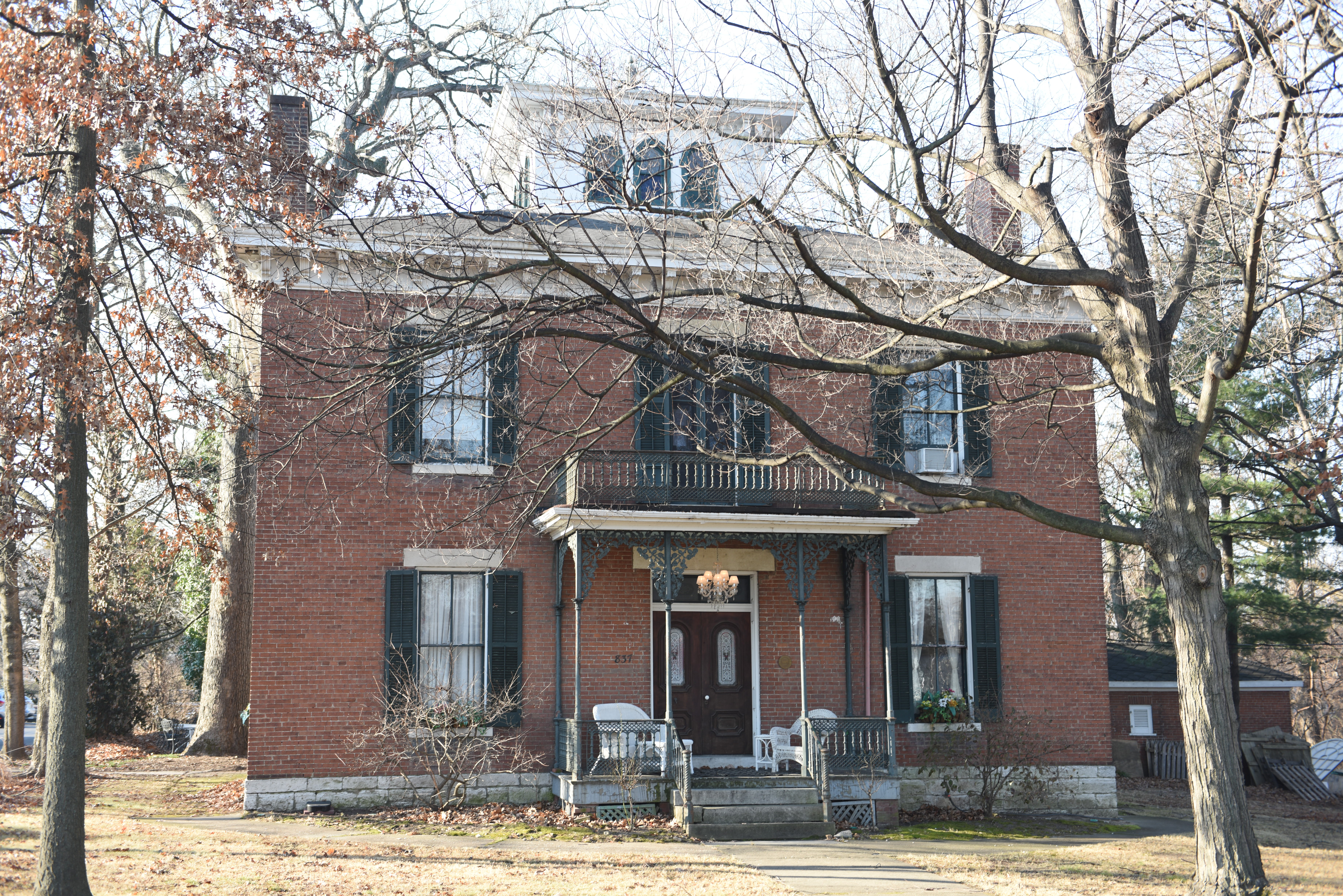

- Location within Missouri Location within the United States
- Location: 837 First Capitol Dr. St. Charles, Missouri
- Coordinates: 38°46′55″N 90°29′27″W
- Area: less than one acre
- Built: c. 1865
- Built by: Kister, H.
- Architectural style: Italianate
- NRHP reference No.: 79003200
- Added to NRHP: October 11, 1979

Marten-Becker House, also known as Becker House, is a historic home located at St. Charles, St. Charles County, Missouri. It was built about 1865, and is a two-story, "L"-plan, Italianate style brick dwelling. It features a richly bracketed cornice, cupola with arched windows of colored glass and ornate cast iron portico. Also on the property are two contributing brick outbuildings.

It was added to the National Register of Historic Places in 1979.
