= African Church (St. Charles, Missouri) =

Historic church in Missouri, United States

- U.S. National Register of Historic Places
- U.S. Historic district – Contributing property
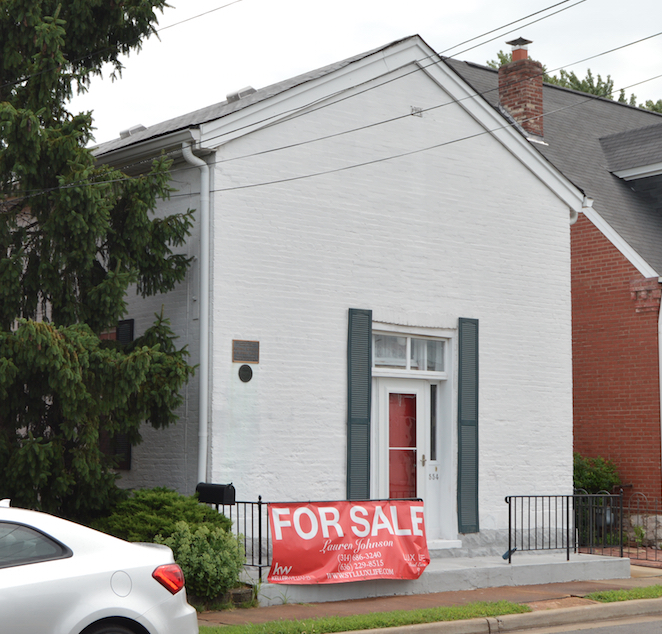

- Location within Missouri Location within the United States
- Location: 554 Madison St., St. Charles, Missouri
- Coordinates: 38°46′57″N 90°29′17″W
- Area: 0.1 acres (0.040 ha)
- Built: c. 1855
- NRHP reference No.: 80004366
- Added to NRHP: November 21, 1980

African Church, also known as the A.M.E. Church of St. Charles, is a historic African Methodist Episcopal church located at 554 Madison Street in St. Charles, St. Charles County, Missouri, United States. It was built about 1855, and is a small brick building with a low-pitched gable roof. The building was renovated in 1947 as a residence.

It was added to the National Register of Historic Places in 1980. It is located in the Midtown Neighborhood Historic District.
