= Augusta, Missouri =

- City
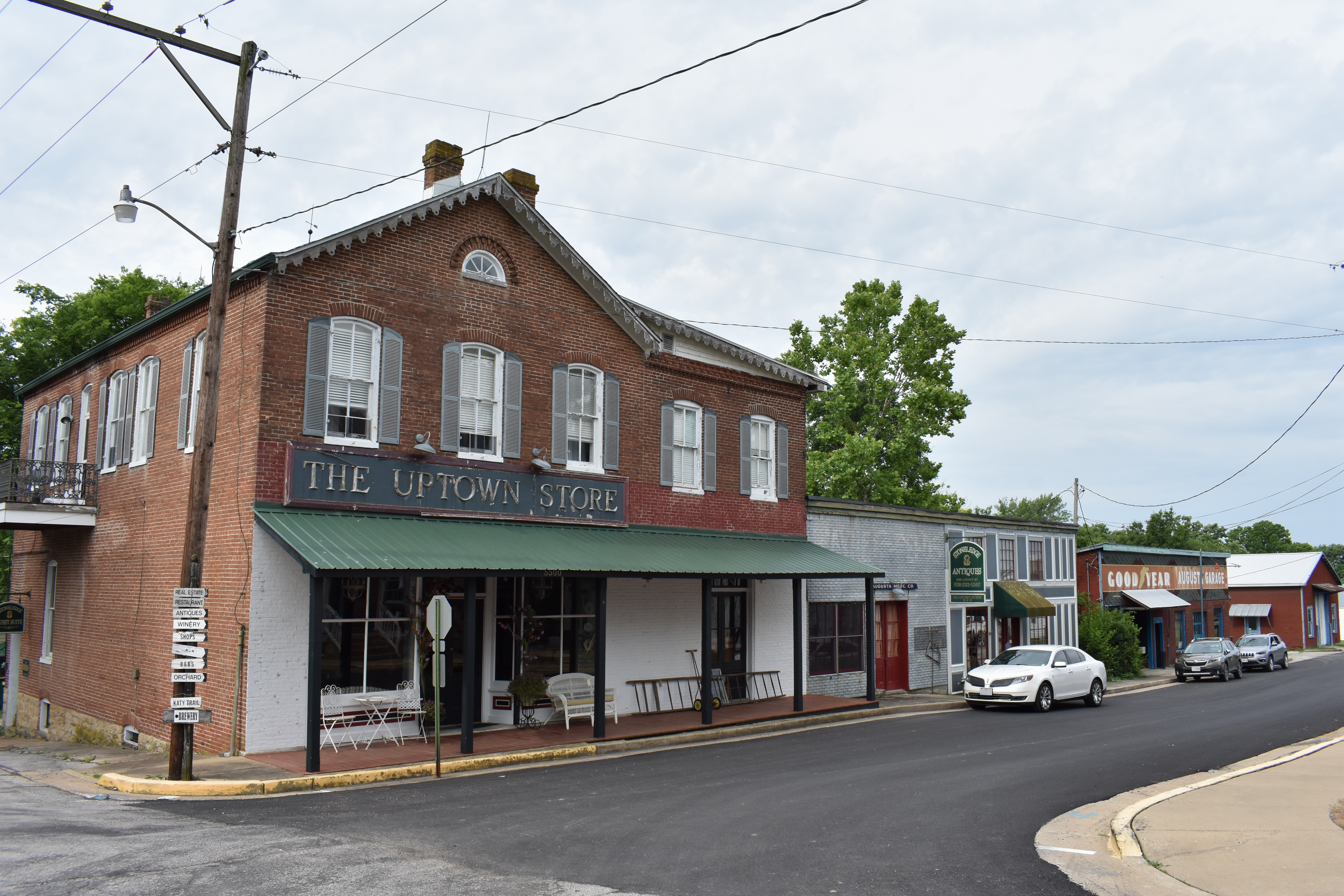

- Location of Augusta, Missouri
- Coordinates: 38°34′20″N 90°52′45″W
- Country: United States
- State: Missouri
- County: St. Charles

Area
  - Total: 0.88 sq mi (2.28 km^{2})
  - Land: 0.88 sq mi (2.28 km^{2})
  - Water: 0 sq mi (0.00 km^{2})
- Elevation: 476 ft (145 m)

Population (2020)
  - Total: 270
  - Density: 306.8/sq mi (118.45/km^{2})
- Time zone: UTC-6 (Central (CST))
  - Summer (DST): UTC-5 (CDT)
- ZIP code: 63332
- Area code: 636
- FIPS code: 29-02512
- GNIS feature ID: 2397444
- Website: www.townofaugustamo.org

Augusta is a city in St. Charles County, Missouri, United States. The population was 270 at the 2020 census, up from 253 at the 2010 census. The city has wineries, antique shops, restaurants, B&B's, a wood shop, a glass studio, massage therapy, a historic museum, and The Augusta Brewery.

Augusta is located in the region known as the Missouri Rhineland. As a result, it is home to two wineries, Augusta Winery and Mount Pleasant Winery. The Augusta viticultural area was recognized by the federal government in 1980 as the first established American Viticultural Area (AVA) in the United States, two months prior to Napa Valley's recognition.

Vineyards and wineries have grown over the decades with more than 125 wineries now in the state of Missouri. Starting in 2020, David Hoffmann and the Hoffmann Family of Companies have invested to grow the region into a wine-tourism destination and have purchased more than two dozen properties, including four wineries and six vineyards.

Augusta is a popular stop along the Katy Trail, a 225-mile-long bike and walking path built along a former railroad right-of-way.

== History ==
Augusta was founded in 1836, by Heinrich Knoernschild of Tiefengrun, Germany. There are stories of another man who named the town after his wife, although those theories cannot be proven.

== Geography ==
According to the United States Census Bureau, the city has a total area of 0.92 square miles (2.38 km^{2}), all land.

== Demographics ==
Historical population
Census	Pop.	Note	%±
1880	318		—
1890	291		−8.5%
1900	238		−18.2%
1910	267		12.2%
1920	308		15.4%
1930	232		−24.7%
1940	252		8.6%
1950	218		−13.5%
1960	206		−5.5%
1970	195		−5.3%
1980	308		57.9%
1990	263		−14.6%
2000	218		−17.1%
2010	253		16.1%
2020	270		6.7%
U.S. Decennial Census

=== 2010 census ===
As of the census of 2010, there were 253 people, 112 households, and 70 families residing in the city. The population density was 275.0 inhabitants per square mile (106.2/km^{2}). There were 131 housing units at an average density of 142.4 per square mile (55.0/km^{2}). The racial makeup of the city was 97.6% White, 1.2% Native American, 0.4% Asian, and 0.8% from two or more races. Hispanic or Latino of any race were 0.8% of the population.

There were 112 households, of which 28.6% had children under the age of 18 living with them, 50.9% were married couples living together, 7.1% had a female householder with no husband present, 4.5% had a male householder with no wife present, and 37.5% were non-families. 34.8% of all households were made up of individuals, and 10.7% had someone living alone who was 65 years of age or older. The average household size was 2.26 and the average family size was 2.91.

The median age in the city was 45.2 years. 22.5% of residents were under the age of 18; 5.1% were between the ages of 18 and 24; 21.7% were from 25 to 44; 32.8% were from 45 to 64; and 17.8% were 65 years of age or older. The gender makeup of the city was 46.6% male and 53.4% female.

=== 2000 census ===
As of the census of 2000, there were 218 people, 102 households, and 63 families residing in the town. The population density was 829.7 inhabitants per square mile (320.3/km^{2}). There were 119 housing units at an average density of 452.9 per square mile (174.9/km^{2}). The racial makeup of the town was 99.08% White, 0.46% Asian, and 0.46% from two or more races.

There were 102 households, out of which 15.7% had children under the age of 18 living with them, 47.1% were married couples living together, 10.8% had a female householder with no husband present, and 37.3% were non-families. 35.3% of all households were made up of individuals, and 14.7% had someone living alone who was 65 years of age or older. The average household size was 2.14 and the average family size was 2.72.

In the town the population was spread out, with 15.6% under the age of 18, 8.7% from 18 to 24, 25.2% from 25 to 44, 30.7% from 45 to 64, and 19.7% who were 65 years of age or older. The median age was 46 years. For every 100 females there were 86.3 males. For every 100 females age 18 and over, there were 85.9 males.

The median income for a household in the town was $35,000, and the median income for a family was $54,375. Males had a median income of $32,500 versus $24,375 for females. The per capita income for the town was $21,065. None of the families and 2.3% of the population were living below the poverty line, including no under eighteens and 10.9% of those over 64.

== Education ==
The School District of Washington covers the entire city. It operates Augusta Elementary School in the city. The comprehensive high school of the district is Washington High School.

Augusta has a public library, a branch of the St. Charles City-County District Library.
