= William Penn High School =

William Penn High School may refer to:

- William Penn High School (Delaware) in New Castle County, Delaware
- William Penn High School (North Carolina), High Point, North Carolina
- William Penn High School (Philadelphia), Philadelphia, Pennsylvania
- William Penn High School in Harrisburg, Pennsylvania, a former school building; see Harrisburg High School

== See also ==
- Penn High School, Mishawaka, Indiana
- William Penn School (disambiguation)
