= List of African-American historic places in North Carolina =

This list of African American Historic Places in North Carolina is based on a book by the National Park Service, The Preservation Press, the National Trust for Historic Preservation, and the National Conference of State Historic Preservation Officers. Other listings are also online.

For National List of African American Historic Places use this link.

Contents: Counties in North Carolina with African American Historic Places
Alamance - Buncombe - Burke - Caswell - Cumberland - Durham - Forsyth - Franklin - Guilford - Granville - Iredell - Johnston - Mecklenburg - Polk - Rockingham - Rowan - Vance - Wake - Warren - Wilson

Some of these sites are on the National Register of Historic Places (NR) as independent sites or as part of larger historic district. Several of the sites are National Historic Landmarks (NRL). Others have North Carolina historical markers (HM). The citation on historical markers is given in the reference. The location listed is the nearest community to the site. More precise locations are given in the reference.

== Alamance County ==
- Burlington
  - McCray School
- Mebane
  - Cooper School

== Buncombe County ==
- Asheville
  - St. Matthias Episcopal Church
  - Young Men's Institute Building

== Burke County ==
- Morganton
  - Gaston Chapel
  - Jonesboro Historic District

== Caswell County ==
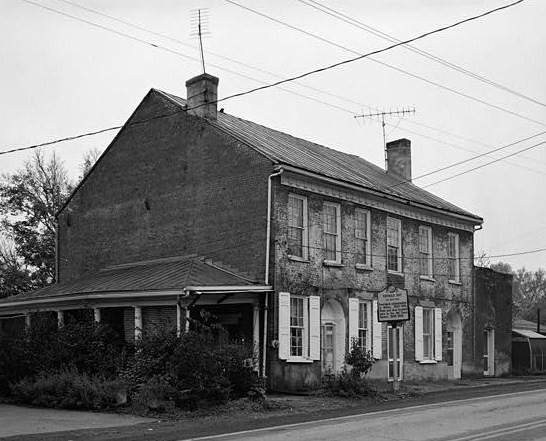
Thomas Day, an early 19th-century free African-American cabinetmaker.

- Milton
  - Union Tavern,

== Cumberland County ==
- Fayetteville
  - Evans Metropolitan AME Zion Church
  - Orange Street School
  - St. Joseph's Episcopal Church

== Durham County ==
- Durham
  - Emmanuel AME Church
  - Geer Cemetery
  - Horton Grove Complex
  - North Carolina Central University
  - North Carolina Mutual Life Insurance Company Building
  - St. Joseph's African Methodist Episcopal Church
  - Scarborough House

== Forsyth County ==
- Winston-Salem
  - S.G. Atkins House
  - St. Philip's Moravian Church,

== Franklin County ==
- Franklinton
  - Dr. J.A. Savage House
- Louisburg
  - Williamson House

== Guilford County ==
- Greensboro
  - North Carolina Agricultural and Technical State University
  - Bennett College for Women
  - Location of the Home of William McBryar Buffalo Soldier
  - Underground Railroad Marker at Guilford College
  - Civil Right Museum location of the Greensboro Sit-in
- High Point
  - Kilby Hotel
  - William Penn High School
- Sedalia
  - Palmer Memorial Institute

== Granville County ==
- Oxford
  - Central Orphanage

== Iredell County, County ==
- Stateville
  - Center Street A.M.E. Zion Church

== Johnston County ==
- Kenly
  - Boyette Slave House

== Mecklenburg County ==
- Charlotte
  - Biddle Memorial Hall, Johnson C. Smith University
  - Mecklenburg Investment Company Building

== Polk County ==
- Mill Spring
  - Rev. Joshua D. Jones House

== Rockingham County ==
- Eden
  - Mt. Sinai Baptist Church
- Reidsville
  - First Baptist Church
  - North Washington Avenue Workers' Houses

== Rowan County ==
- Salisbury
  - Livingston College Historic District
  - Mount Zion Baptist

== Vance County ==
- Machpelah
  - Tucker's Grove Camp Meeting Ground
  - West Badin Historic District

== Wake County ==
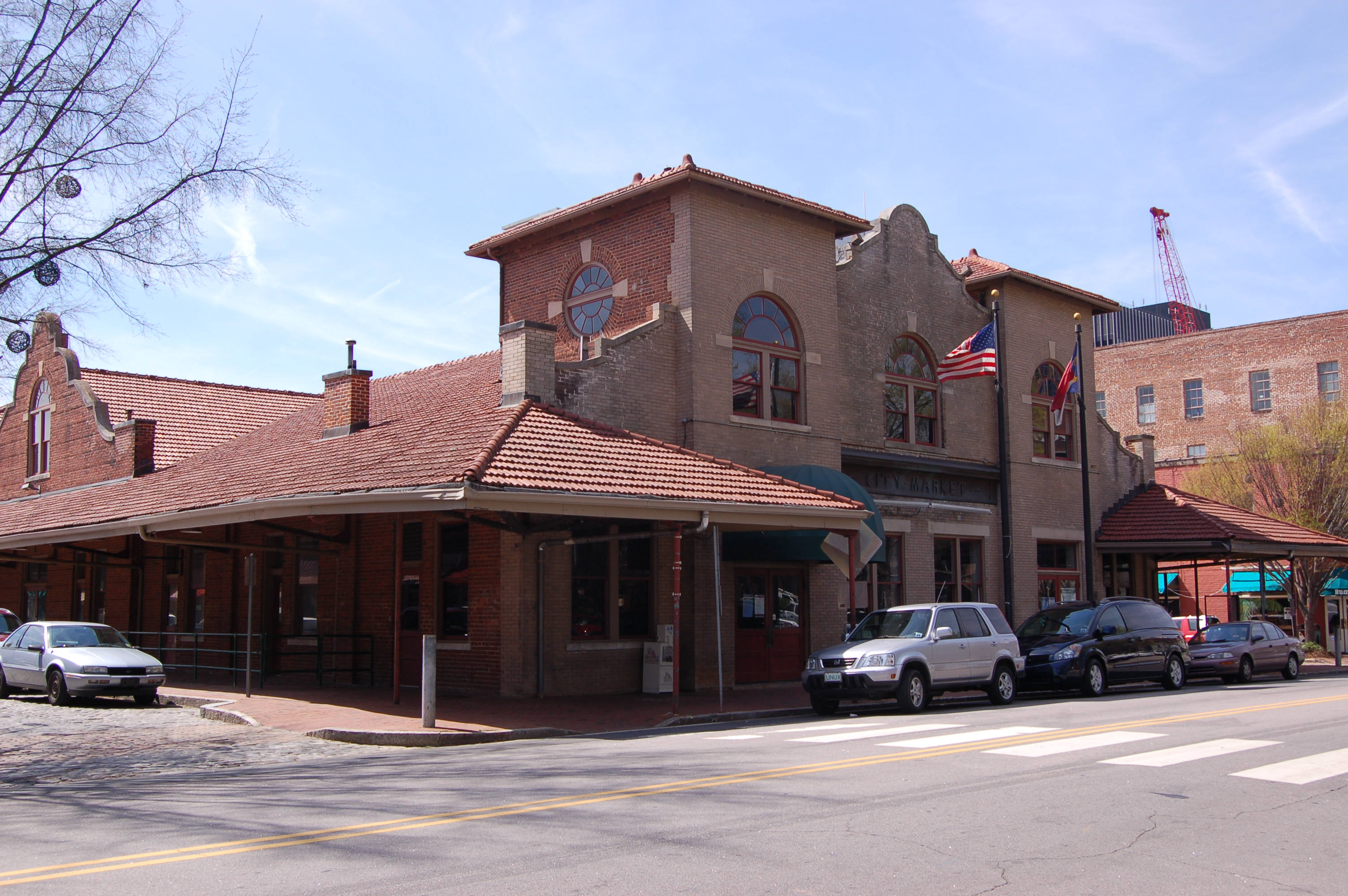
The district includes East Hargett Street, once known as Raleigh's "Black Main Street", due to the fact it once contained the largest number of businesses owned by African-Americans in the city.

- Raleigh
  - East Raleigh-South Park Historic District
  - Estey Hall
  - Masonic Temple Building
  - Moore Square Historic District
  - Peace College Main Building
  - St. Paul A.M.E. Church

== Warren County ==
- Warrenton
  - Mansfield Thorton House
  - Sledge-Hayley House
- Soul City

== Wilson County ==
- Wilson
  - East Wilson Historic District

== See also ==
- History of slavery in North Carolina
- List of African-American historic places
