= William Penn School =

William Penn is a name given to a number of schools and educational establishments, including:

== United States ==
- William Penn Senior High School, York, Pennsylvania
- William Penn High School (North Carolina), High Point, North Carolina
- William Penn School District, Delaware County, Pennsylvania
- William Penn Charter School, Philadelphia, Pennsylvania
- William Penn High School (Philadelphia), former school in Philadelphia, Pennsylvania
- William Penn High School for Girls, Philadelphia, Pennsylvania
- William Penn High School (Delaware), New Castle, Delaware
- William Penn High School in Harrisburg, Pennsylvania, former school building; see Harrisburg High School
- William Penn University, Oskaloosa, Iowa

== UK ==
- The Charter School North Dulwich – previously Dulwich High School and prior to that William Penn School
