= African Americans in North Carolina =

Largest minority in North Carolina

Total population
- 2,415,824 (2017)

Regions with significant populations
- Charlotte, Durham, Fayetteville, Greensboro, Raleigh

Languages
- Southern American English, African-American Vernacular English, Gullah, African languages

Religion
- Black Protestant

Related ethnic groups
- African Americans, Barbadian Americans, West Indian Americans, Barbadians

African-American North Carolinians or Black North Carolinians are residents of the state of North Carolina who are of African ancestry. As of the 2010 U.S. Census, African Americans were 22% of the state's population. African enslaved people were brought to North Carolina during the slave trade.

In the 2020 Census, 2,140,217 North Carolina residents were identified as African American (20.5% of the total 10,439,388). In 5 of the state's 100 counties, African Americans make up more than 50% of the population: Bertie (59.8%), Hertford (57.5%), Edgecombe (56.1%), Northampton (55.5%), Halifax (51.1%). African Americans in the ten counties of Mecklenburg (330,458), Wake (208,493), Guilford (181,848), Cumberland (127,610), Durham (110,610), Forsyth (95,324), Pitt (60,414), Cabarrus (42,622), Gaston (40,323), Nash (36,958) make up more than 57% of all African Americans in the state.

== History ==
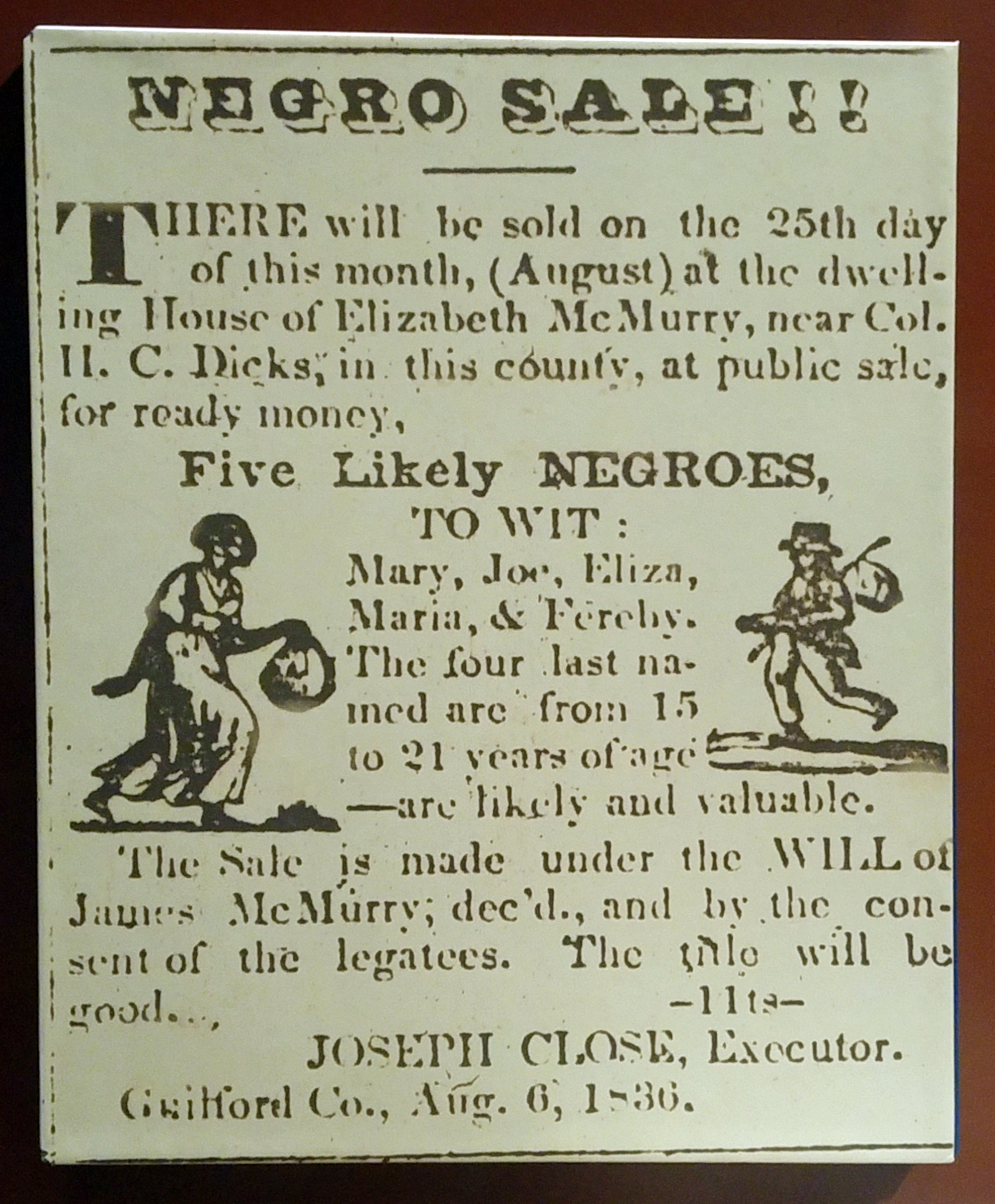
Slave ad at Greensboro Historical Museum.

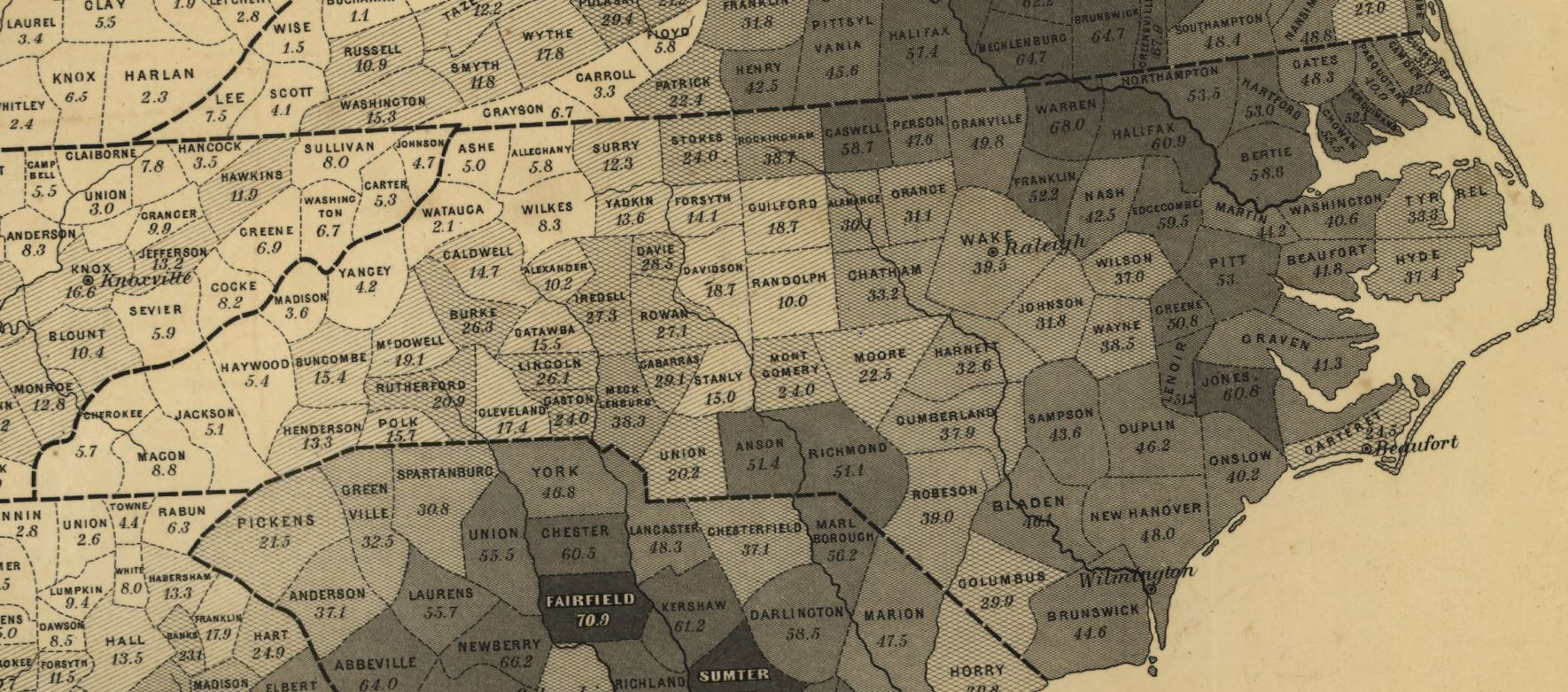
Slave counties by percentage in 1860.

North Carolina was originally inhabited by several Native American tribes, including the Cape Fear, Cheraw, Cherokee, Chowanoke, Croatoan, Meherrin, Saponi, Tuscarora, and Waccamaw. Many Native Americans later died due to diseases brought by the Spanish and were forcibly moved to Indian Territory under Andrew Jackson. Following the decline of the Native American population, white settlers enslaved Africans to uphold white dominance and preserve their wealth.

Slavery has been part of North Carolina's history since its colonization by white Europeans in the late 1600s and early 1700s. Many of the first black enslaved people in North Carolina were brought to the colony from the West Indies, but a significant number were brought from Africa. Records were not kept of the tribes and homelands of African enslaved people in North Carolina.

=== Free Black people ===
A significant number of free African Americans migrated from Virginia to North Carolina, making up most free families in the state. Many owned land, and communities formed around free Black people who would continuously migrate onto the frontier and purchase the more affordable land there. At least one member of most families tended to own land, causing closer relationships with whites.

Significant numbers of free African Americans in the state caused the North Carolina General Assembly to pass a law in 1723 mandating that freed slaves must leave the colony, and a law restricting manumission in 1741. A complaint in the 1723 Assembly mentioned:

"great Numbers of Free Negroes, Mulattoes, and other persons of mixt Blood, that have lately removed themselves into this Government, and that several of them have intermarried with the white Inhabitants of this Province..."

However, by 1790 free Black people represented 5% of free people in some counties in the state. Some of these families would alternatively be classed as white or "mulatto" by tax assessors. In some cases, settlers would attempt to illegally indenture them for longer than their term, or sell them into slavery. After the Free Negro Code, many married freed slaves.

=== Segregation ===
African Americans in North Carolina suffered from racial segregation. Most white people in North Carolina sought to refine the Jim Crow system and retain systematic segregation. Some free people of color agitated for separate schools under Jim Crow, apart from freedmen, who unlike them, had not been free before the Civil war. They were granted separate schools under different names, such as "Croatan" schools for the Lumbee, or "Indian" schools for the "old-issue negroes" of Person County.

== Gallery ==
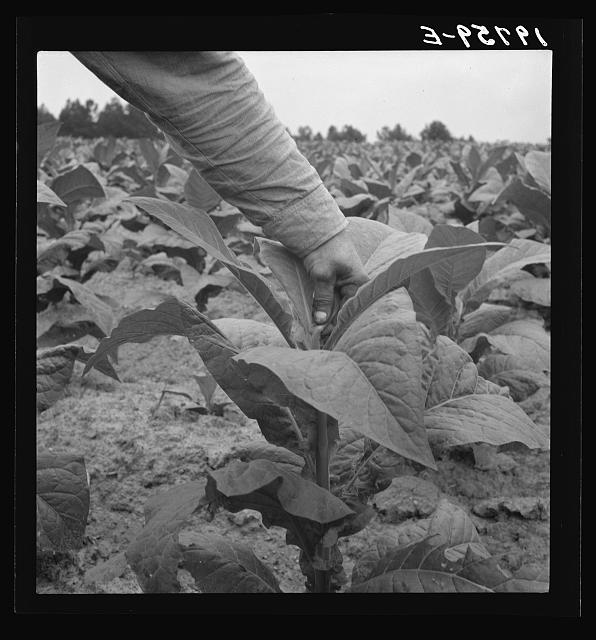

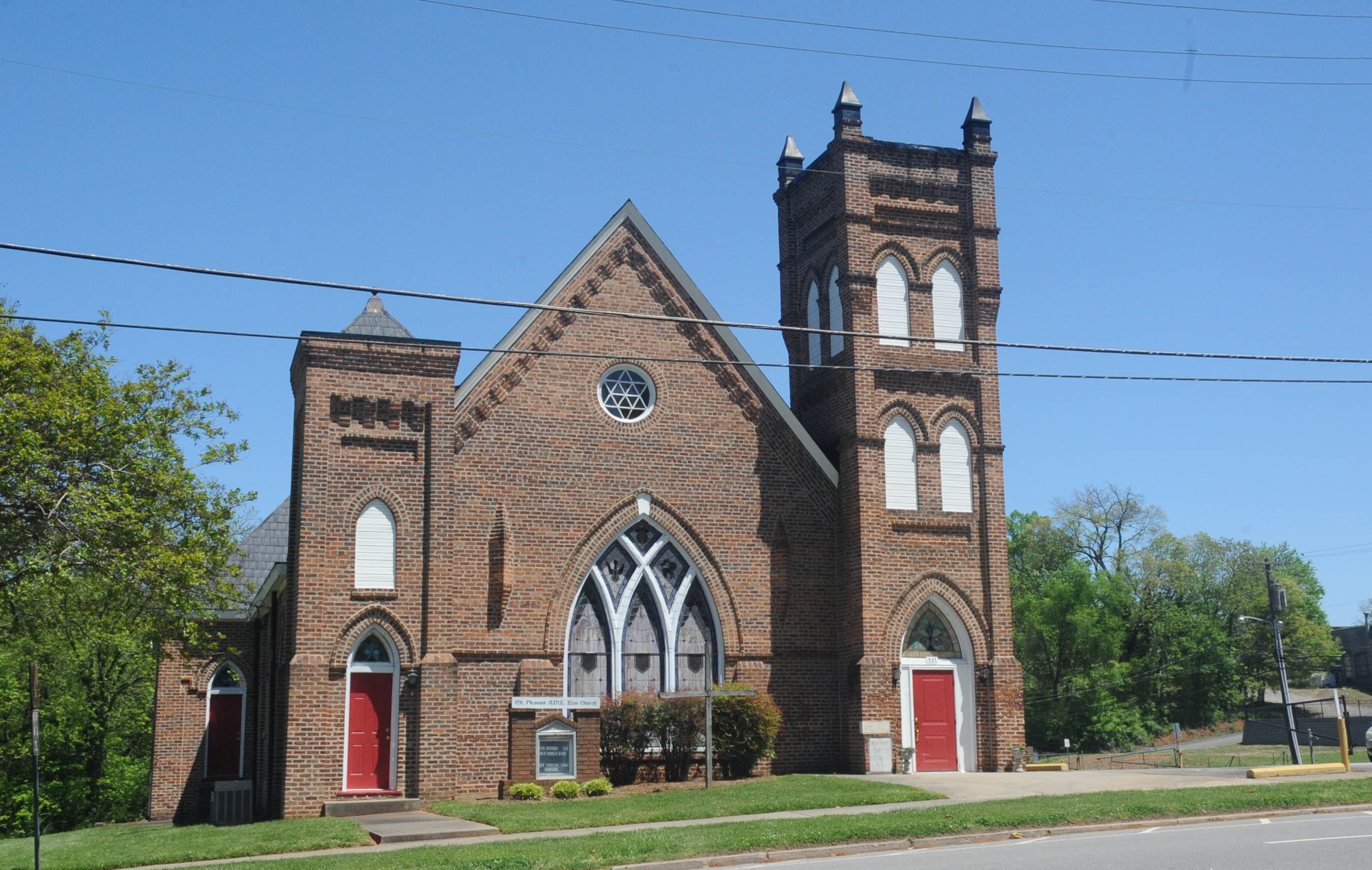

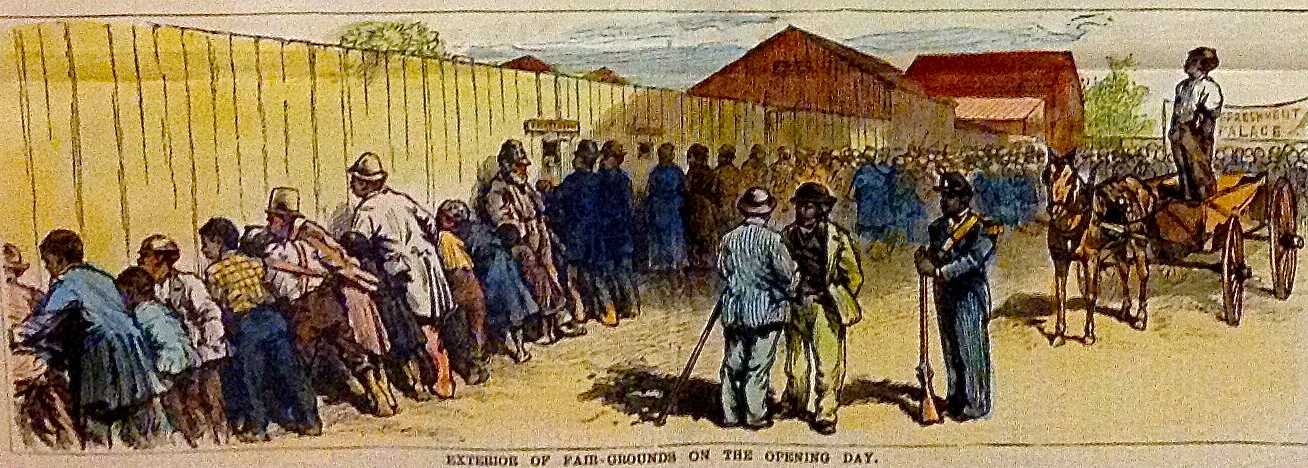

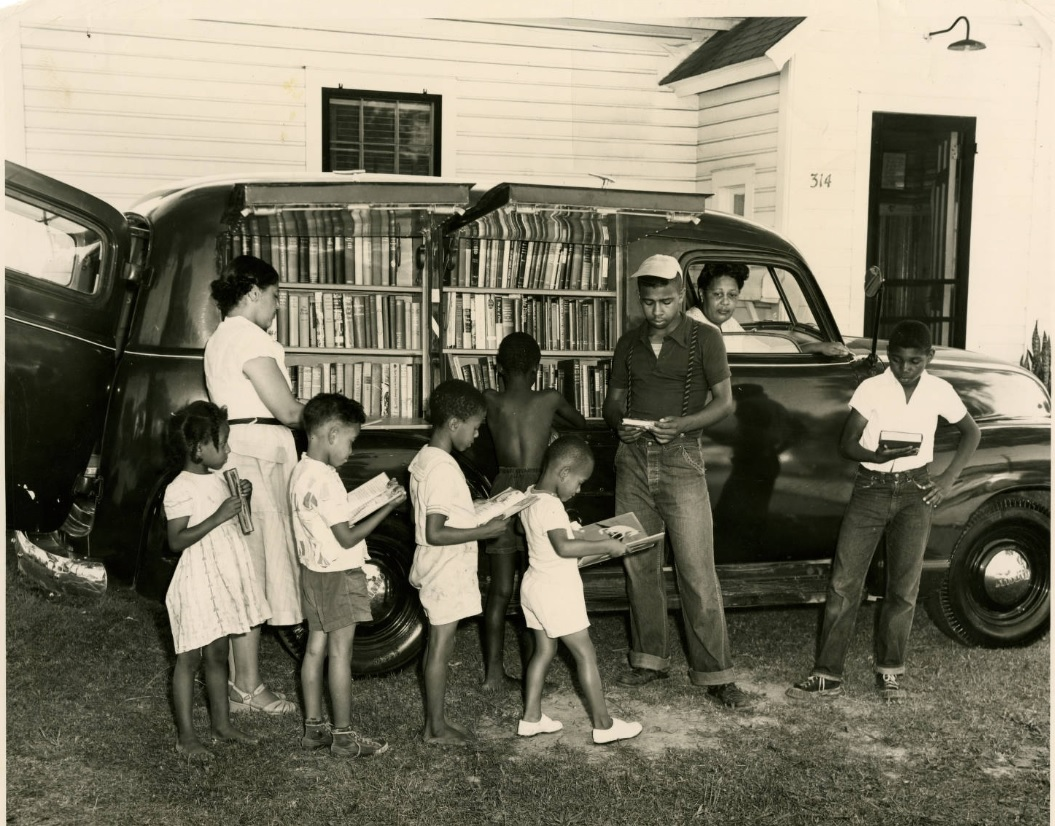

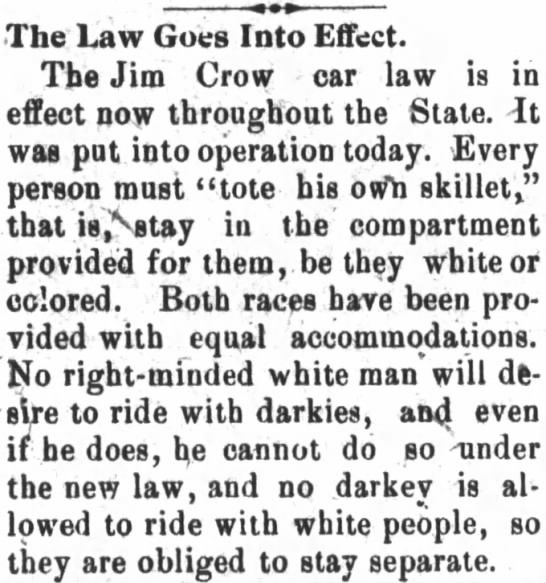

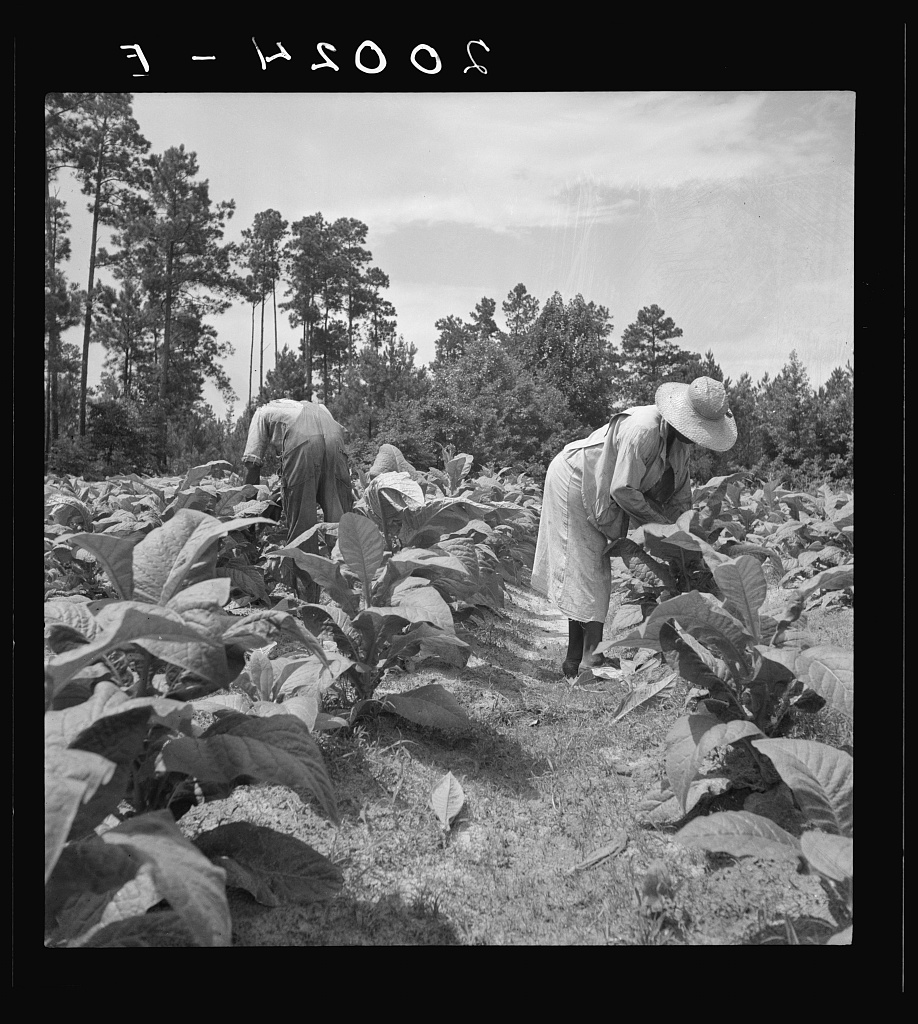

== List of historic communities ==
Western North Carolina:

- Rock Hill, Asheville, North Carolina
- Petersburg, Asheville, North Carolina
- Brooklyn, Asheville, North Carolina
- Old Shiloh, Asheville, North Carolina
- [New] Shiloh, Asheville, North Carolina
- Lincoln Park, Burnsville, North Carolina

== People ==
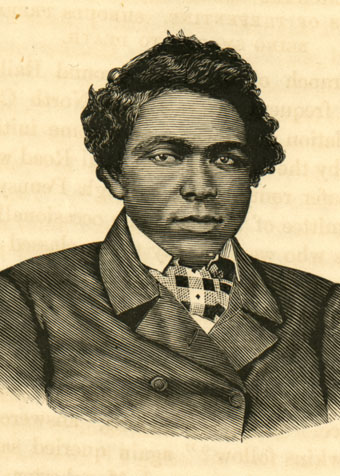
Abraham Galloway

- John Chavis
- Abraham Galloway
- George Moses Horton, an enslaved poet, North Carolina's first known author of literature
- Elizabeth Keckley
- George White
- Hiram R. Revels
- J. Cole

== See also ==
- African Americans in South Carolina
- African Americans in Tennessee
- African Americans in Georgia (U.S. state)
- Atlantic Creole
- Bristol slave trade
- Coastwise slave trade
- Colonial South and the Chesapeake
- Great Dismal Swamp maroons
- Gullah
- History of slavery in North Carolina
- Scramble (slave auction)
- Seasoning (colonialism)
- Slavery in the colonial history of the United States
- Tobacco colonies
- Black Southerners
- History of North Carolina
- Demographics of North Carolina
- List of African-American historic places in North Carolina
- List of African-American newspapers in North Carolina
