= Gwendolyn Ann Magee =

American fiber artist (1943–2011)

Gwendolyn (Gwen) Ann Magee
- Born: Gwendolyn Ann Jones; August 31, 1943; High Point, North Carolina
- Died: April 27, 2011 (aged 67); Jackson, Mississippi, U.S.
- Education: William Penn High School; Woman's College of the University of North Carolina; Kent State University; Washington University in St. Louis
- Known for: Fiber art

Gwendolyn (Gwen) Ann Magee (August 31, 1943 – April 27, 2011) was an African-American fiber artist. Learning to quilt in the middle of her life, Magee quickly became known in the world of fiber art for her abstract and narrative quilts depicting the African-American experience. Her work can be found in the permanent collections of the Mississippi Museum of Art, the Museum of Mississippi History, the Michigan State University Museum, and the Renwick Gallery of the Smithsonian Museum of American Art, and has been exhibited internationally.

== Biography ==
Magee was born Gwendolyn (Gwen) Ann Jones in 1943 in High Point, North Carolina. As a child, she was exposed to art, craft, and museums by her adoptive mother, a schoolteacher named Annie Lee Jones. Her parents subscribed to the 24-volume The Metropolitan Seminars in Art series by John Canaday and the 90-volume Art Treasures of the World, published by Harry N. Abrams, and Magee was drawn to the volumes featuring Van Gogh and Gauguin because of the artists' vibrant use of color. Graduating in 1959 from William Penn High School in High Point, she entered the Woman's College of the University of North Carolina (now the University of North Carolina at Greensboro) in nearby Greensboro. UNC was in its fourth year of desegregation, and Magee was one of five African Americans in her class. During her time at college, Greensboro was a center of civil rights activities, and Magee became active in local demonstrations against segregation in the community. This experience would later influence her artistic work.

Following her graduation in 1963 with a B.A. in sociology, Jones continued graduate study in social science at Kent State University and Washington University in St. Louis, working as an assistant with various research projects. She never earned a graduate degree but did assist with many fieldwork studies. It was during one of these studies in Mound Bayou, Mississippi, that she met Dr. D. E. Magee, an ophthalmologist. The two married in 1969, and after Dr. Magee completed his residency in Philadelphia, the couple moved to Jackson, Mississippi, where they established careers and raised their two daughters, Kamili and Aliya.

Magee died in Jackson in 2011 after battling a long-term illness. She was 67 years old.

== Art career ==
Wanting to make quilts for her daughters to take to college, Magee enrolled in a quilting class in 1989. After completing classes at Joy's Craft Shop in Jackson and Anne's Quilt Shop in Clinton, Magee learned about the Jackson Quilters and the Mississippi Quilt Association, where she was the only African American member of the groups at that time. Looking back at that time, Magee recounted: "After I really became interested in quilting, I started looking for information about other African American quilters, and at first, the only references I could find highlighted us from the 'folk art' or 'outside artist' perspectives, and put forth all kinds of theories that stopped just barely short of saying that we were not capable of matching points and putting together intricate and 'well-made' quilts. This was one factor in my determination that no one would ever be able to say that my workmanship was shoddy." She quickly excelled at her craft and transitioned from traditional block patterns to more ambitious abstract and narrative designs recounting African-American history and culture. Magee also drew influence from her childhood in a creative home, education in the social sciences, participation in the civil rights movement, social work and business careers, and her experiences as a wife, mother, and grandmother.

Throughout the 1990s and 2000s, Magee used her quilts to bring attention to racial injustices of the past and the present. Many of her quilts, including When Hope Unborn Had Died, narrate the impact of slavery in the United States. From 2000 to 2004, Magee worked on a series of 12 quilts inspired by the song "Lift Every Voice and Sing" by James Weldon Johnson. Through her textile art, Magee has also responded to contemporary events. In response to the state of Mississippi voting to keep the Confederate battle cross in their state flag, she created Southern Heritage/Southern Shame in 2001, with layered images of the Confederate flag, bodies hanging from nooses, and the hood of a Ku Klux Klan robe. Her quilt, Requiem, depicts the loss of African-American culture when Hurricane Katrina devastated New Orleans.

Magee's work is in the permanent collections of the Mississippi Museum of Art, the Museum of Mississippi History (Department of Archives and History), the Michigan State University Museum, and the Renwick Gallery of the Smithsonian Museum of American Art. Magee's work also has been exhibited in the Museum of Arts and Design, the Atlanta History Museum, the National Art Gallery of Namibia, the Val d'Argent Expo in Alsace, France, the Victoria and Albert Museum in London, and at numerous other national and international galleries. She has received numerous awards and fellowships, including the Mississippi Institute of Arts and Letters' Visual Artist of the Year (2003), a United States Artists' Ford Fellow (2007), and a Governor's Award for excellence in visual arts (2011), among others.

== Exhibition history ==
Solo Exhibitions

- "Pieces of the Past: The Art of Gwendolyn Magee", The High Point Museum in High Point, North Carolina (December 5, 2014 – February 21, 2015)
- Lift Every Voice and Sing: The Quilts of Gwendolyn Ann Magee, Gatewood Gallery of the University of North Carolina at Greensboro (September 11–November 8, 2014)
- "Journey of the Spirit: The Art of Gwendolyn Magee", Mississippi Museum of Art (2005)

== Published works ==
- Ashes of Faith. Bwire, Robert, 2007, cover art.
- A Communion of the Spirits: African-American Quilters, Preservers and Their Stories. Roland Freeman, 1996.
- Color Play. Wolfrom, Joen, 2000.
- Feminist Interpretation of the Bible and the Hermeneutics of Liberation. Schroer, Silvia, and Sophia Bietenhard, eds, 2003, cover art.
- Journey of the Spirit: The Art of Gwendolyn A. Magee. Mississippi Museum of Art, 2004.
- Mississippi Quilts. Mary Elizabeth Johnson, 2001.
- "Portfolio 12". Studio Art Quilt Associates publication, 2005.
- Spirits of the Cloth: Contemporary African American Quilts. Carolyn Mazloomi, 1998.
- Textural Rhythms: Quilting the Jazz Tradition. Carolyn Mazloomi, 2007.
- The Mississippi Story. Mississippi Museum of Art, 2007.
- Threads of Faith: Recent Works From the Women of Color Quilters Network. Carolyn Mazloomi and Patricia C. Pongracz, 2004.
