= Demographics of North Carolina =

Historical population
Census	Pop.	Note	%±
1790	393,751		—
1800	478,103		21.4%
1810	556,526		16.4%
1820	638,829		14.8%
1830	737,987		15.5%
1840	753,419		2.1%
1850	869,039		15.3%
1860	992,622		14.2%
1870	1,071,361		7.9%
1880	1,399,750		30.7%
1890	1,617,949		15.6%
1900	1,893,810		17.1%
1910	2,206,287		16.5%
1920	2,559,123		16.0%
1930	3,170,276		23.9%
1940	3,571,623		12.7%
1950	4,061,929		13.7%
1960	4,556,155		12.2%
1970	5,082,059		11.5%
1980	5,881,766		15.7%
1990	6,628,637		12.7%
2000	8,049,313		21.4%
2010	9,535,483		18.5%
2020	10,439,388		9.5%
2025 (est.)	11,197,968		7.3%
Source: 1910–2020, 2025

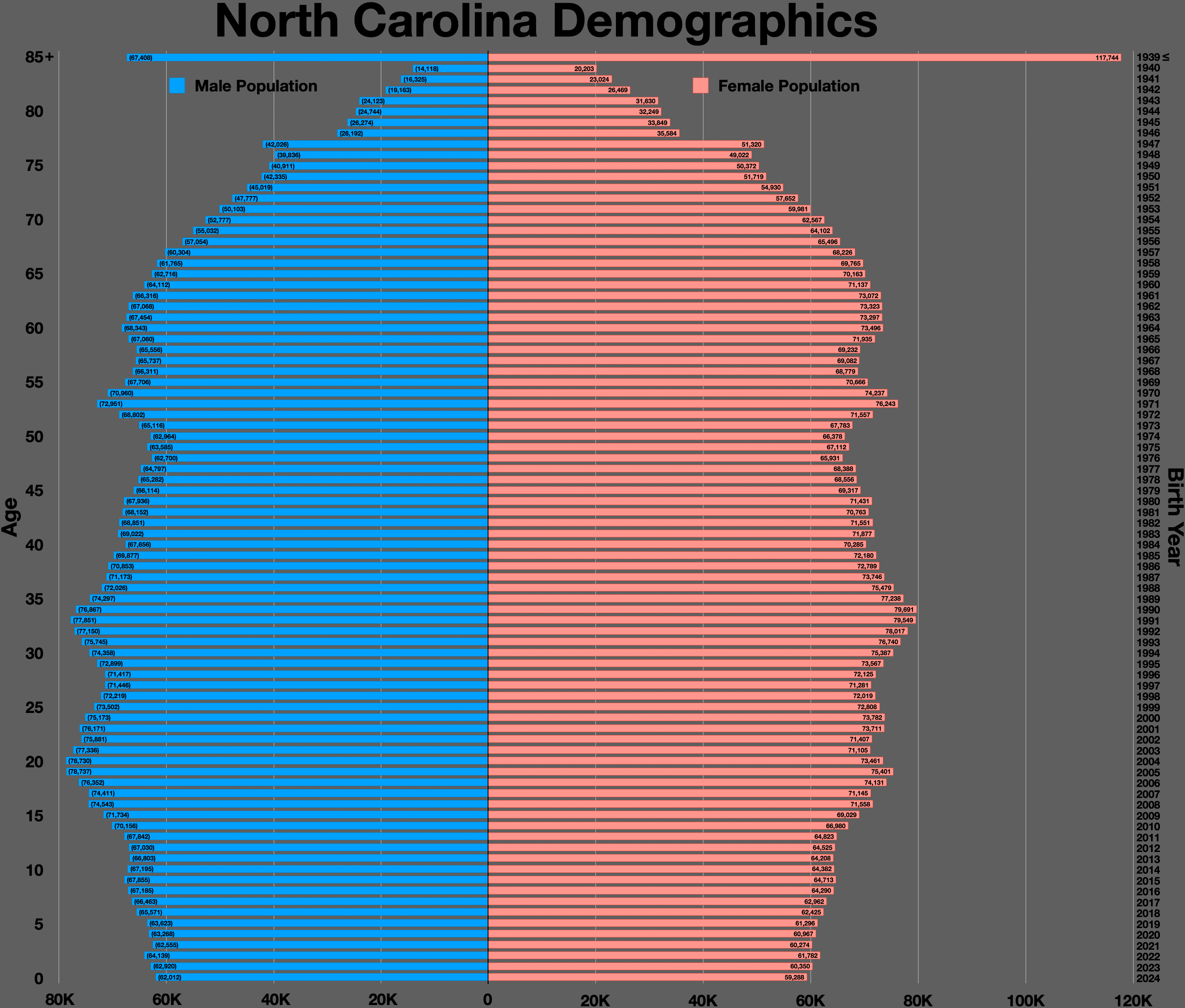
North Carolina population pyramid

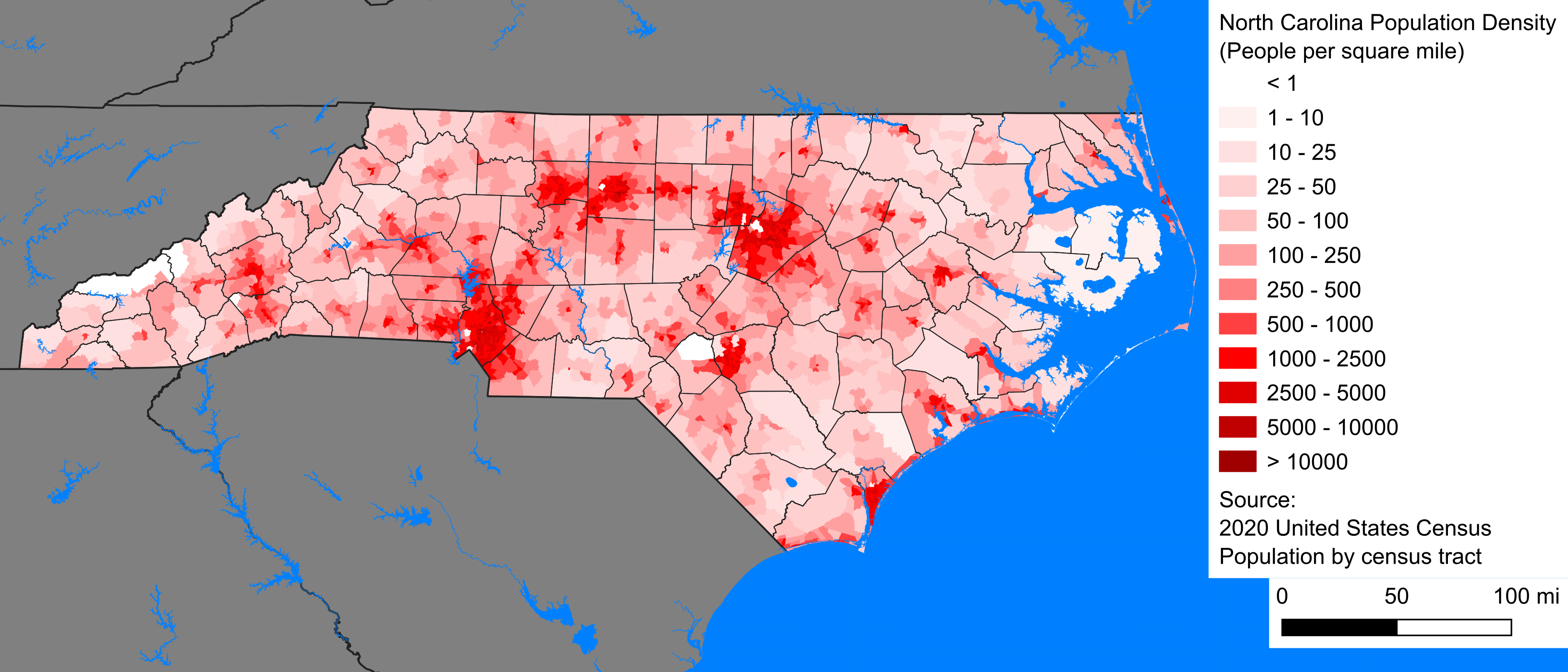
North Carolina Population Density in 2020.

Demographics of North Carolina covers the varieties of ethnic groups who reside in North Carolina and relevant trends.

== Center of population ==
With two-thirds of North Carolina's population living in the middle one-third of its landmass, the middle third of the state is about four times more densely populated than the remaining two-thirds.

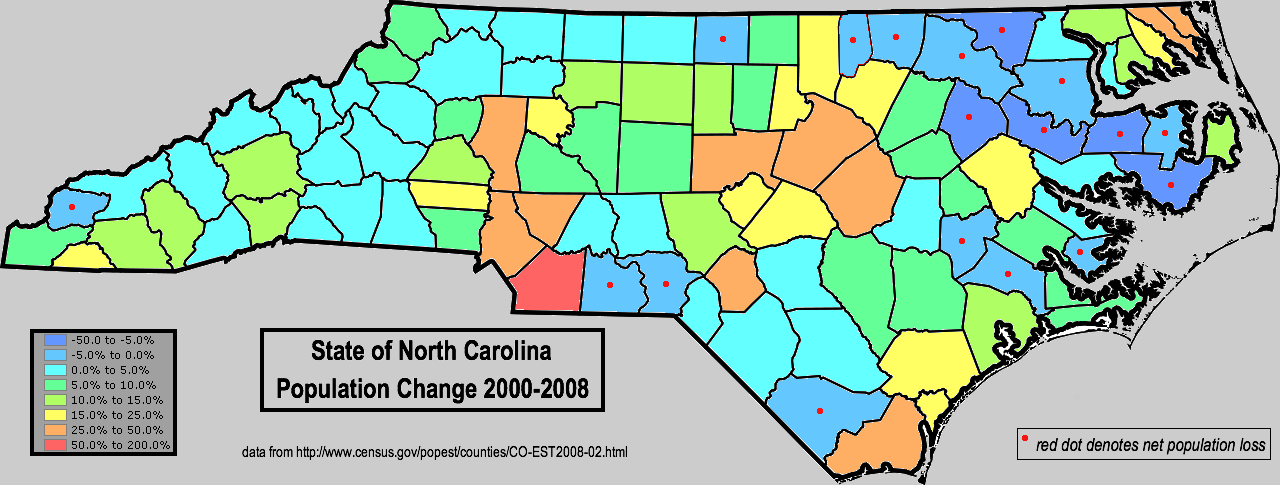
Change in population from 2000 to 2008, using census estimates. Note the large-scale area of net population loss in the inland northeastern part of the state; they contained the highest percentage of African Americans, according to the Census 2000 data; but many have left for jobs in urban areas.

The center of population of North Carolina is located in Randolph County, in the town of Seagrove.

The United States Census Bureau, as of July 1, 2009, estimated North Carolina's population at 9,380,884 which represents an increase of 1,340,334, or 16.7%, since the last census in 2000. This exceeds the rate of growth for the United States as a whole. The growth comprises a natural increase since the last census of 412,906 people (1,015,065 births minus 602,159 deaths) and an increase due to net migration of 783,382 people into the state. Immigration from outside the United States resulted in a net increase of 192,099 people, and migration within the country produced a net gain of 591,283 people. Between 2005 and 2006, North Carolina passed New Jersey to become the 10th most populous state. The state's population reported as under 5 years old was 6.7%, 24.4% were under 18, and 12.0% were 65 or older. Women made up approximately 51% of the population.

=== Metropolitan areas ===
North Carolina has three major Metropolitan Combined Statistical Areas with populations of more than 1 million:

- Charlotte Metro: Charlotte-Concord-Gastonia, North Carolina-South Carolina - population 2,402,623
- The Triangle: Raleigh-Durham-Cary-Chapel Hill, North Carolina - population 2,156,253
- Piedmont Triad: Greensboro-Winston-Salem-High Point, North Carolina - population 1,589,200

North Carolina has nine municipalities with populations of more than 100,000, with 16 municipalities with populations over 50,000 (U.S. Census Bureau 2010 figures):

- Charlotte: Mecklenburg County - population 731,424
- Raleigh: Wake and Durham Counties - population 403,892
- Greensboro: Guilford County - population 269,666
- Winston-Salem: Forsyth County - population 229,617
- Durham: Durham and Wake Counties - population 228,330
- Fayetteville: Cumberland County - population 200,564
- Cary: Wake and Chatham Counties - population 135,234
- High Point: Guilford, Davidson, Randolph and Forsyth Counties - population 104,371
- Wilmington: New Hanover County - population 106,456

Officially, as drawn from verified US Census Department Statistics, the 15 largest cities in North Carolina are:
1 Charlotte: Mecklenburg County - population 731,424
2 Raleigh: Wake County - population 403,892
3 Greensboro: Guilford County - population 269,666
4 Durham: Durham and Wake Counties - population 256,330
5 Winston-Salem: Forsyth County - population 233,123
6 Fayetteville: Cumberland County - population 200,564
7 Cary: Wake and Chatham Counties - population 135,234
8 Wilmington: New Hanover County - population 106,476
9 High Point: Guilford, Davidson, Randolph and Forsyth Counties - population 104,371
10 Greenville: Pitt County - population 86,017
11 Asheville: Buncombe County - population 83,393
12 Concord: Cabarrus County - population 79,066
13 Gastonia: Gaston County - population 71,059
14 Jacksonville: Onslow County - population 70,145
15 Chapel Hill: Durham and Orange Counties - population 57,477

These figures may differ from local estimates, chamber of commerce estimates, or other unofficial sources.

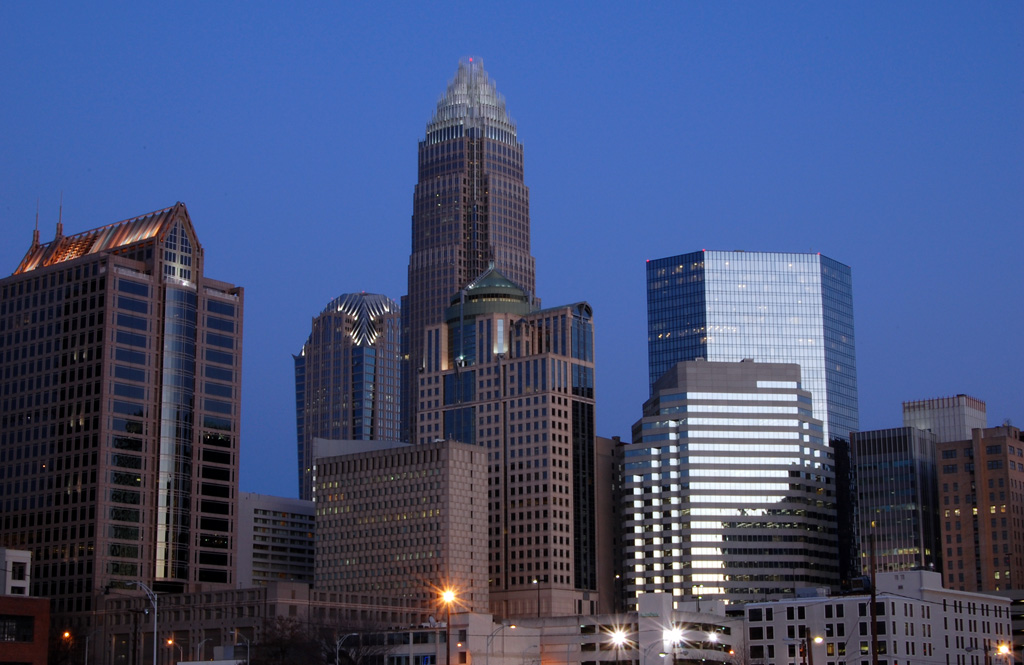
Charlotte

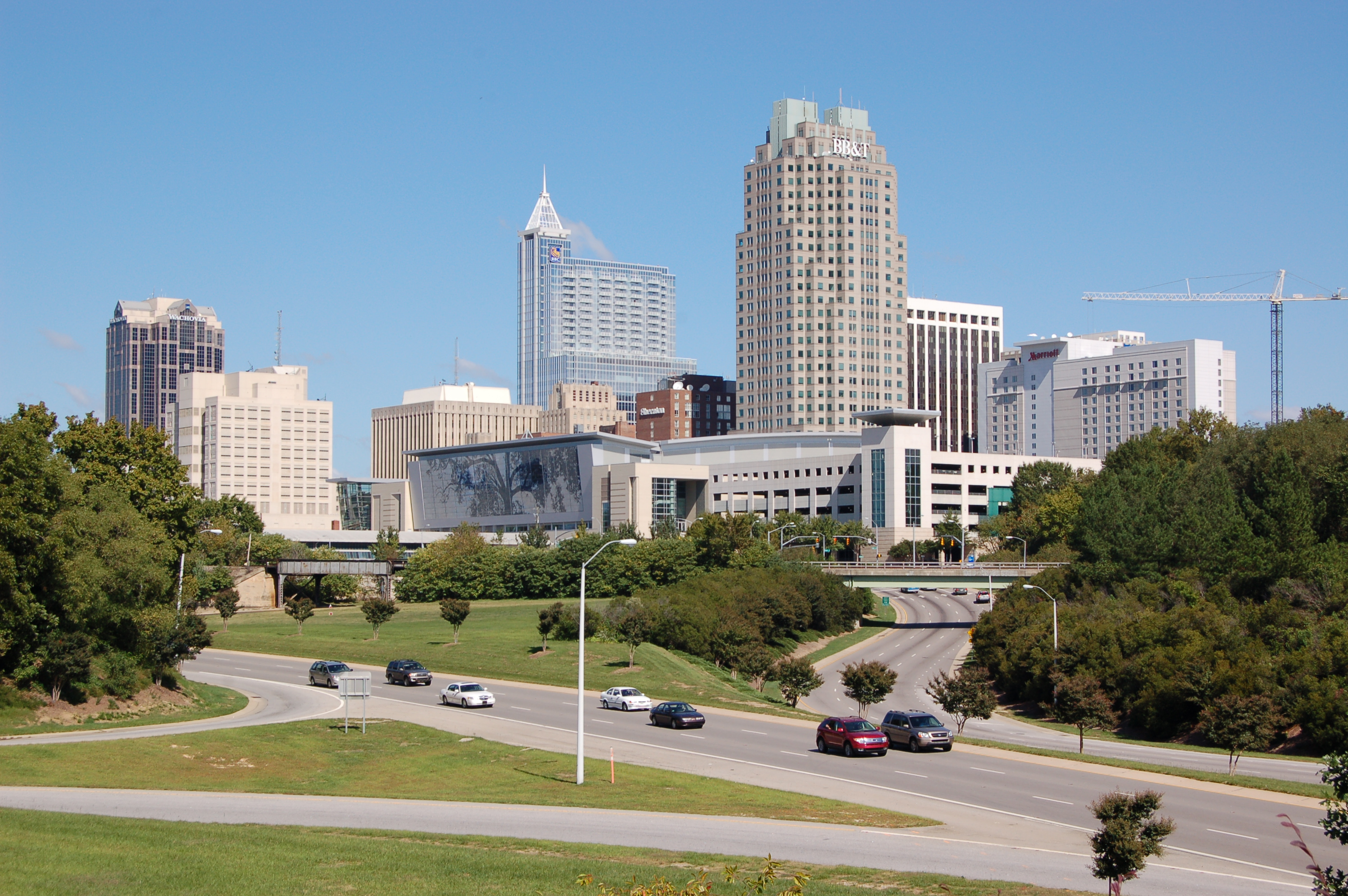
Raleigh

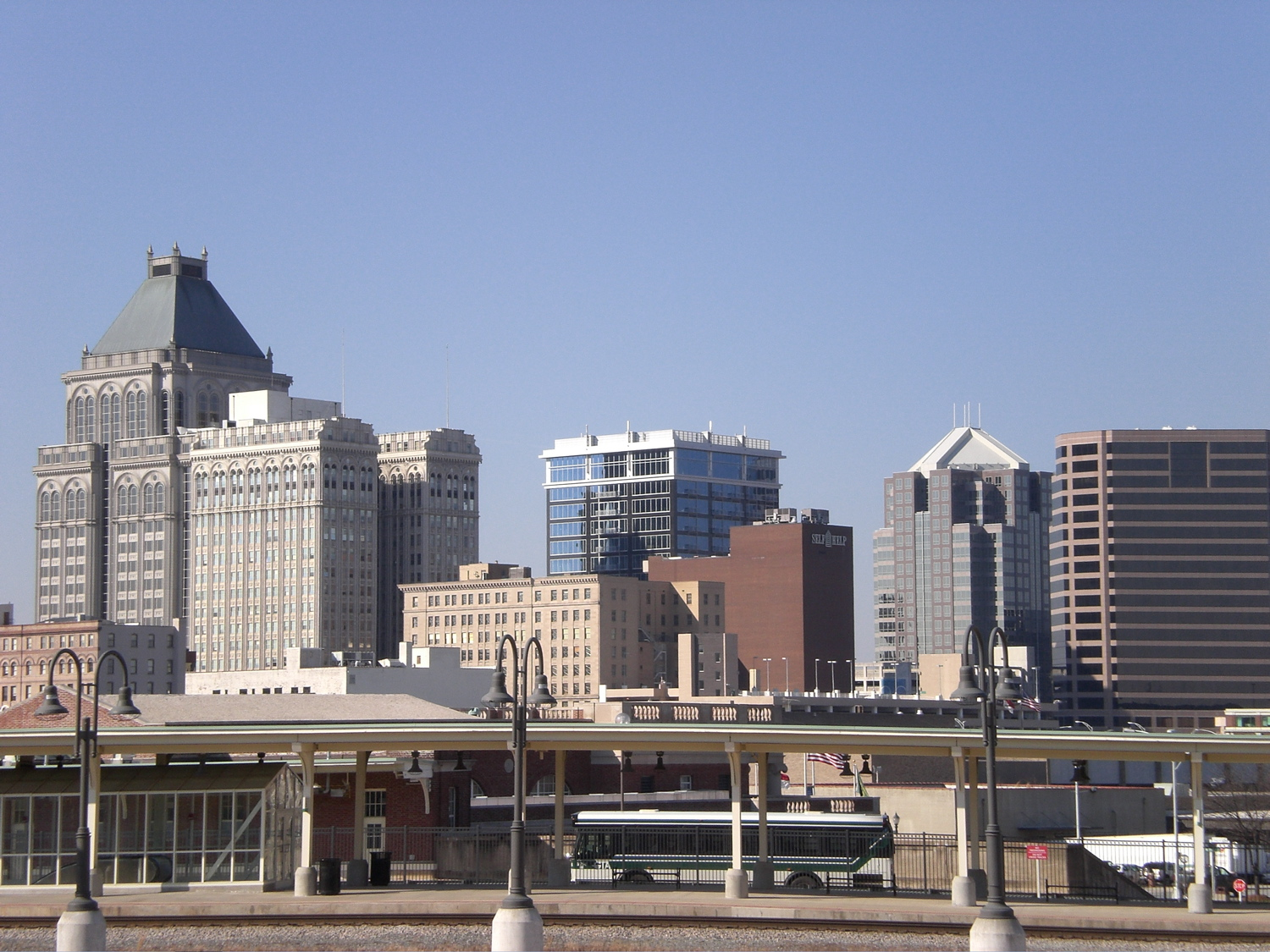
Greensboro

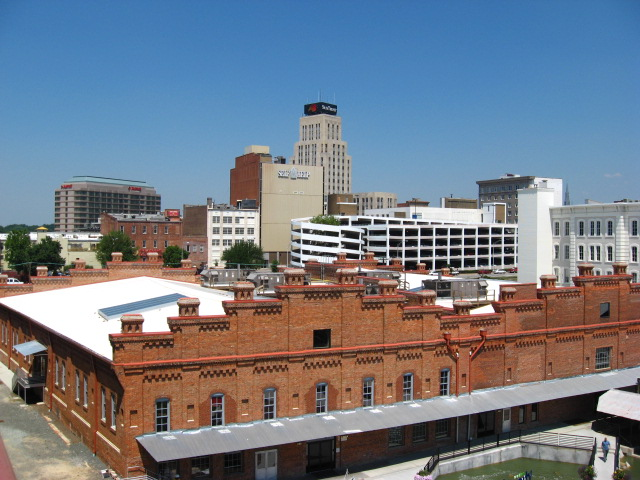
Durham

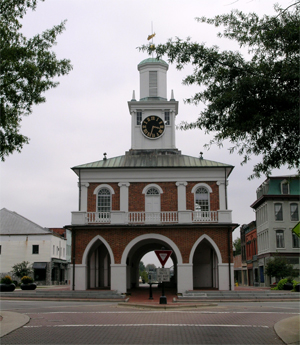
Fayetteville

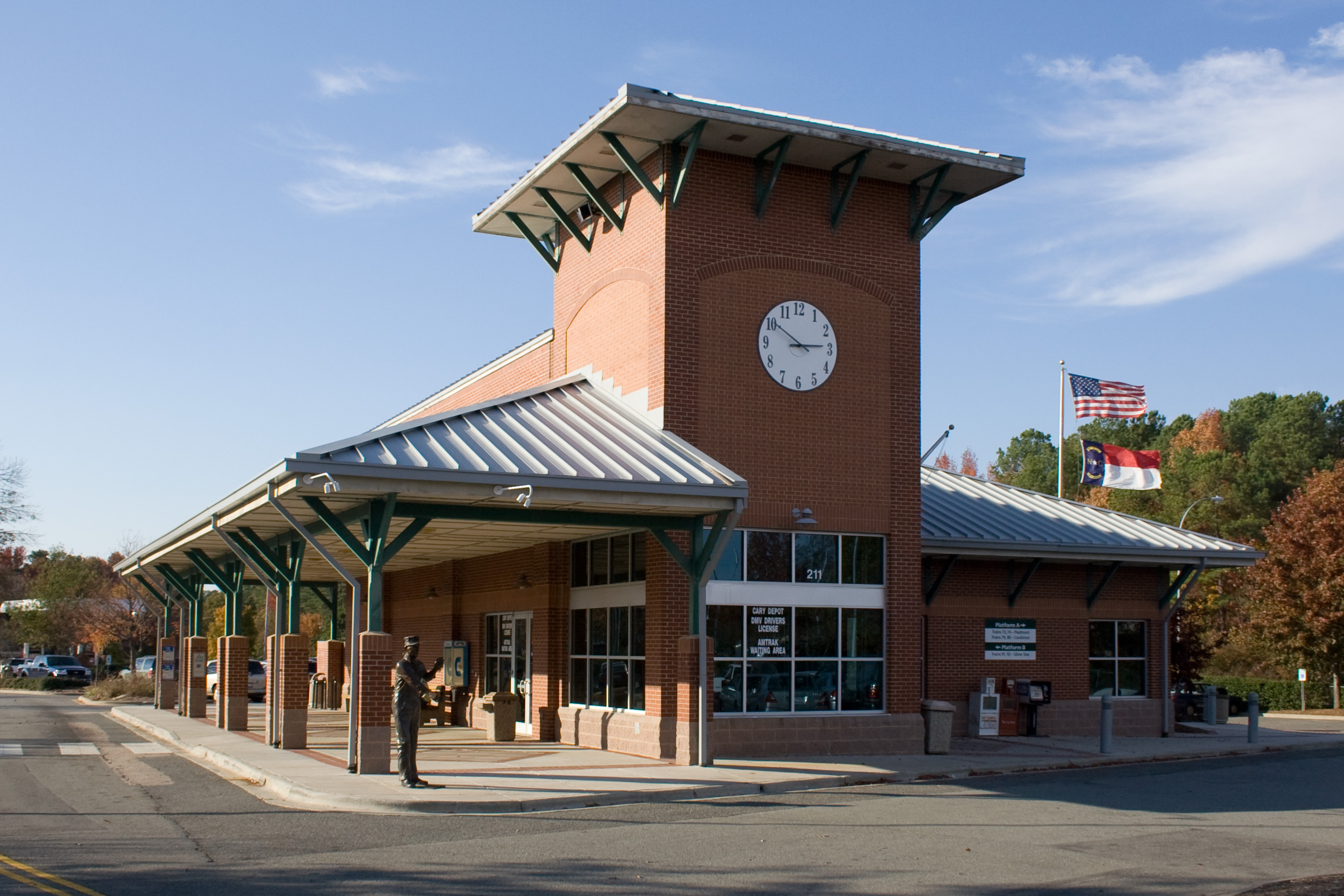
Cary

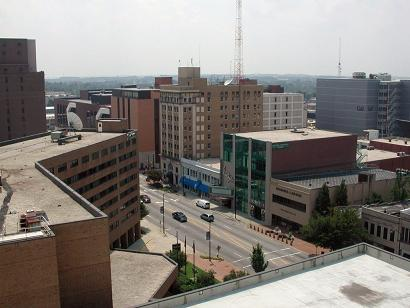
High Point

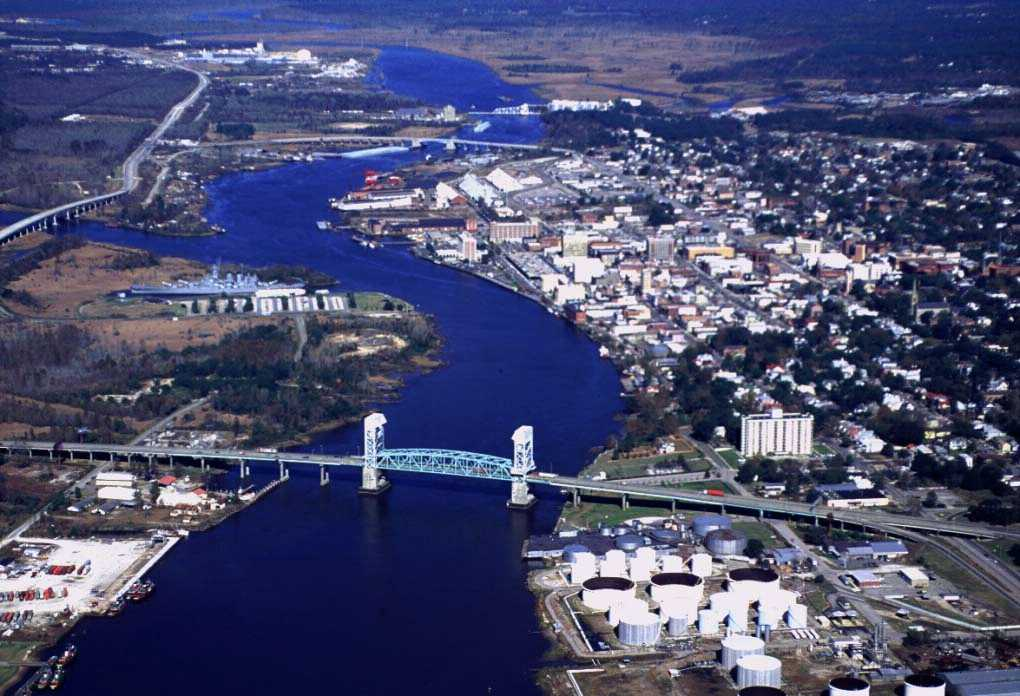
Wilmington

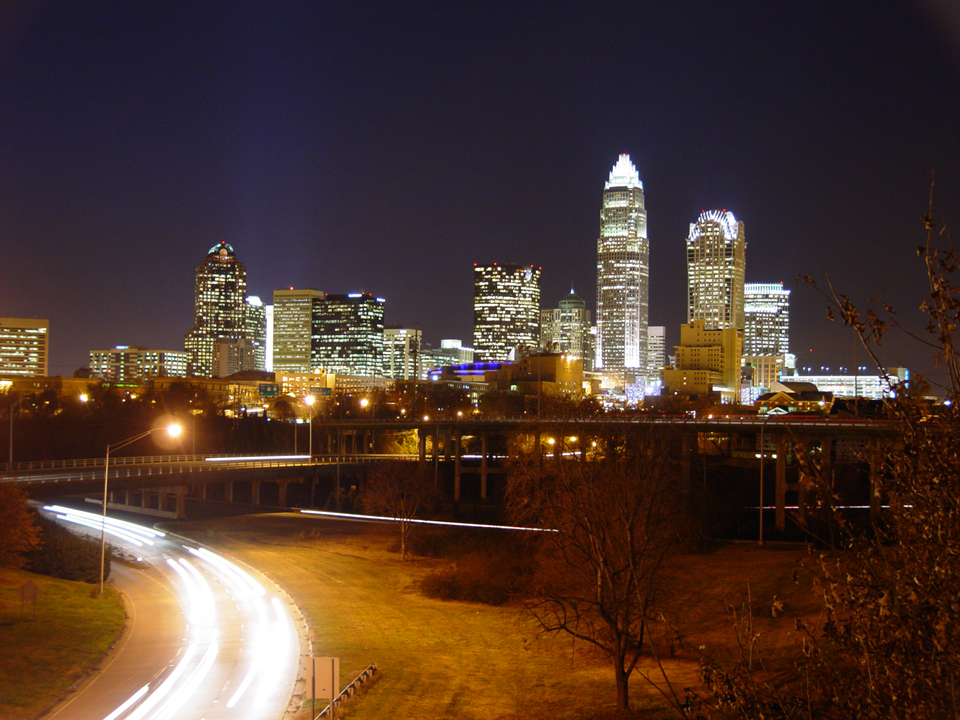
Charlotte

Greensboro

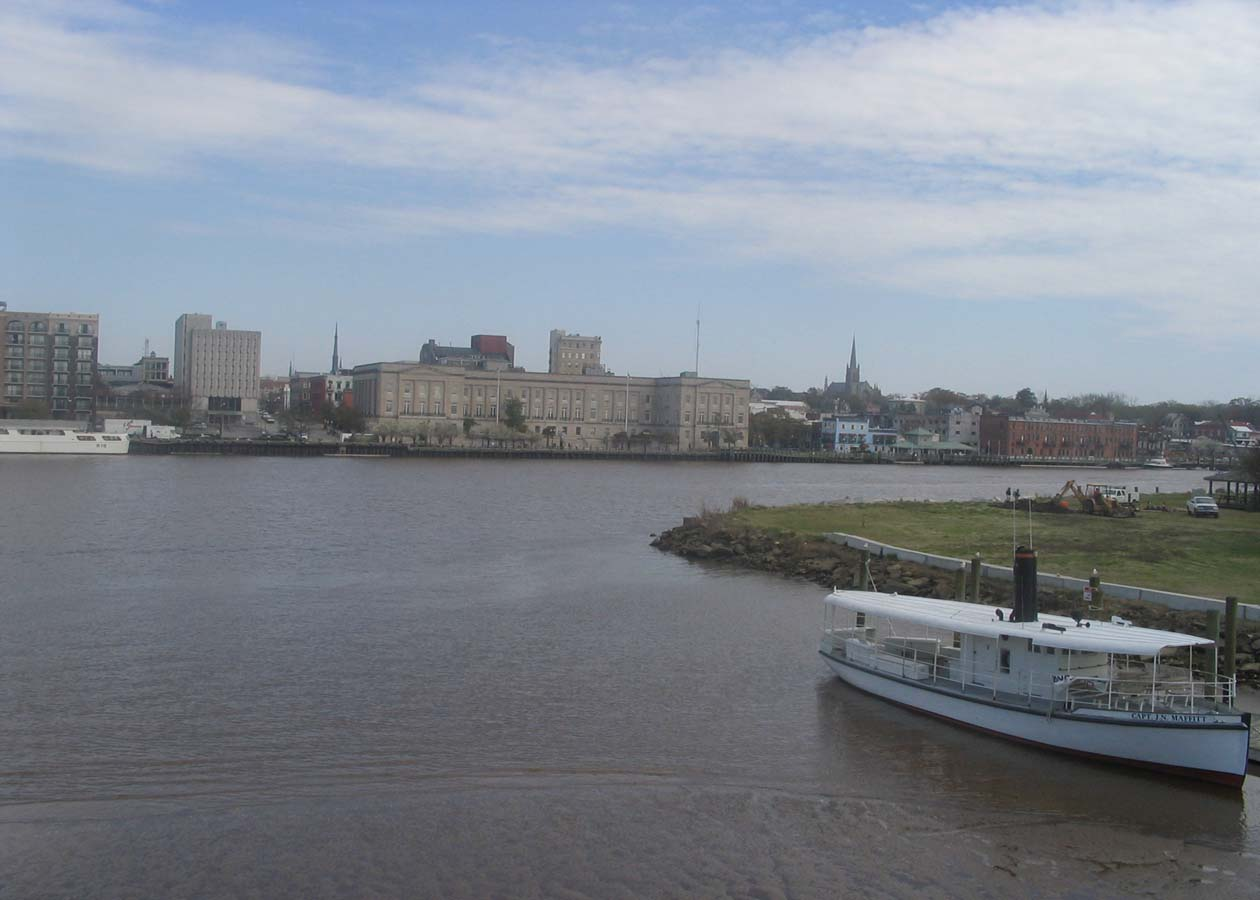
Wilmington

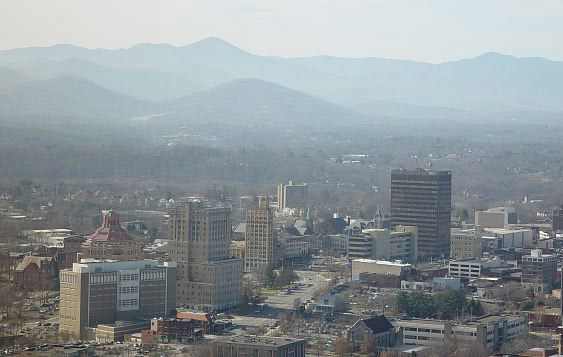
Asheville

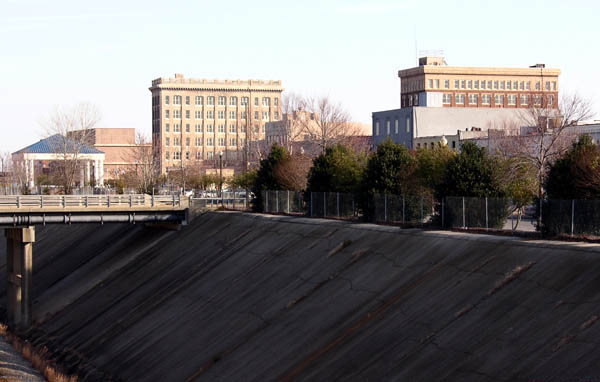
Gastonia

== Vital statistics ==
Source: Centers for Disease Control and Prevention (CDC)

Year	Population	Live births	Deaths	Natural change	Crude birth rate (per 1,000)	Crude death rate (per 1,000)	Natural change (per 1,000)	Crude migration change (per 1,000)
1999	7,650,789	113,795	69,600	44,195	14.87	9.10	5.77	21.54
2000	8,081,614	120,311	71,935	48,376	14.89	8.90	5.99	9.08
2001	8,210,122	118,185	70,934	47,251	14.40	8.64	5.76	8.43
2002	8,326,201	117,335	72,027	45,308	14.09	8.65	5.44	8.86
2003	8,422,501	118,323	73,459	44,864	14.05	8.72	5.33	6.85
2004	8,553,152	119,847	72,384	47,463	14.01	8.47	5.55	10.60
2005	8,705,407	123,096	74,638	48,458	14.14	8.57	5.57	12.40
2006	8,917,270	127,859	74,716	53,143	14.34	8.38	5.96	14.00
2007	9,118,037	131,037	76,046	54,991	14.38	8.34	6.03	11.86
2008	9,309,449	130,839	77,283	53,556	14.05	8.30	5.75	13.00
2009	9,449,566	126,845	77,117	49,728	13.43	8.16	5.26	8.92
2010	9,574,586	122,350	78,773	43,577	12.78	8.23	4.55	8.43
2011	9,658,913	120,389	79,882	40,507	12.47	8.27	4.20	5.14
2012	9,751,810	119,831	81,925	37,906	12.29	8.40	3.89	6.18
2013	9,846,717	119,002	83,329	35,673	12.09	8.46	3.63	6.58
2014	9,937,295	120,975	85,367	35,608	12.18	8.59	3.58	5.97
2015	10,037,218	120,843	89,133	31,710	12.04	8.88	3.16	6.79
2016	10,161,802	120,779	90,465	30,314	11.88	8.90	2.98	9.30
2017	10,275,758	120,125	93,157	26,968	11.69	9.07	2.62	8.94
2018	10,391,358	118,954	93,885	25,069	11.44	9.03	2.41	6.57
2019	10,501,384	118,725	95,881	22,844	11.30	9.13	2.17	7.47
2020	10,449,652	116,730	109,449	7,281	11.17	10.47	0.70	–5.56
2021	10,564,320	120,466	118,093	2,373	11.41	11.18	0.22	10.89
2022	10,710,793	121,562	112,923	8,639	11.36	10.55	0.81	
2023	10,881,189	119,744	107,748	11,996	11.00	9.94	1.06	
2024		122,856	106,055	16,801	11.21	9.79	1.42	
2025	11,197,968	123,561	107,748	15,813				

Note: Births in table do not add up because Hispanics are counted both by their ethnicity and by their race, giving a higher overall number.

Live Births by Single Race/Ethnicity of Mother
Race	2014	2015	2016	2017	2018	2019	2020	2021	2022	2023	2024
White	67,551 (55.8%)	67,122 (55.5%)	65,746 (54.4%)	64,278 (53.5%)	63,514 (53.4%)	62,205 (52.4%)	60,518 (51.8%)	63,239 (52.5%)	62,762 (51.6%)	61,143 (50.9%)	62,159 (50.6%)
Black	31,963 (26.4%)	31,864 (26.4%)	27,422 (22.7%)	27,886 (23.2%)	27,670 (23.3%)	27,733 (23.4%)	27,228 (23.3%)	27,028 (22.4%)	26,375 (21.7%)	25,135 (20.9%)	24,854 (20.2%)
Asian	5,730 (4.7%)	5,861 (4.9%)	4,942 (4.1%)	5,006 (4.2%)	4,834 (4.1%)	4,867 (4.1%)	4,718 (4.0%)	4,684 (3.9%)	4,824 (4.0%)	4,920 (4.1%)	5,391 (4.4%)
American Indian	2,025 (1.7%)	1,964 (1.6%)	1,465 (1.2%)	1,597 (1.3%)	1,599 (1.3%)	1,574 (1.3%)	1,351 (1.2%)	1,407 (1.2%)	1,401 (1.2%)	1,309 (1.1%)	1,228 (1.0%)
Hispanic (any race)	17,784 (14.7%)	18,091 (15.0%)	18,362 (15.2%)	18,464 (15.4%)	18,360 (15.4%)	19,105 (16.1%)	19,449 (16.7%)	20,613 (17.1%)	22,568 (18.6%)	23,788 (19.8%)	25,485 (20.7%)
Total	120,975 (100%)	120,843 (100%)	120,779 (100%)	120,125 (100%)	118,954 (100%)	118,725 (100%)	116,730 (100%)	120,466 (100%)	121,562 (100%)	120,082 (100%)	122,856 (100%)

- Since 2016, data for births of White Hispanic origin are not collected, but included in one Hispanic group; persons of Hispanic origin may be of any race.

== Race and Ethnicity ==
North Carolina – Racial and ethnic composition Note: the US Census treats Hispanic/Latino as an ethnic category. This table excludes Latinos from the racial categories and assigns them to a separate category. Hispanics/Latinos may be of any race.
Race / Ethnicity (NH = Non-Hispanic)	Pop 1980	Pop 1990	Pop 2000	Pop 2010	Pop 2020	% 1980	% 1990	% 2000	% 2010	% 2020
White alone (NH)	4,428,562	4,971,127	5,647,155	6,223,995	6,312,148	75.29%	74.99%	70.16%	65.27%	60.46%
Black or African American alone (NH)	1,304,563	1,449,142	1,723,301	2,019,854	2,107,526	22.18%	21.86%	21.41%	21.18%	20.19%
Native American or Alaska Native alone (NH)	63,797	78,930	95,333	108,829	100,886	1.08%	1.19%	1.18%	1.14%	0.97%
Asian alone (NH)	21,153	50,593	112,416	206,579	340,059	0.36%	0.76%	1.40%	2.17%	3.26%
Native Hawaiian or Pacific Islander alone (NH)	x	x	3,165	5,259	6,980	x	x	0.04%	0.06%	0.07%
Other race alone (NH)	7,024	2,119	9,015	15,088	46,340	0.12%	0.03%	0.11%	0.16%	0.44%
Mixed race or Multiracial (NH)	x	x	79,965	155,759	406,853	x	x	0.99%	1.63%	3.90%
Hispanic or Latino (any race)	56,667	76,726	378,963	800,120	1,118,596	0.96%	1.16%	4.71%	8.39%	10.72%
Total	5,881,766	6,628,637	8,049,313	9,535,483	10,439,388	100.00%	100.00%	100.00%	100.00%	100.00%

Per the 2020 U.S. census, the racial and ethnic distribution of North Carolina's population was 60.5% white non-Hispanic, 20.2% Black non-Hispanic, 1.0% Native American/Alaska Native non-Hispanic, 3.3% Asian non-Hispanic, 0.1% Pacific Islander non-Hispanic, 0.4% Other race non-Hispanic, 3.9% Mixed race or Multiracial (non-Hispanic), and 10.7% Hispanic or Latino (of any race).

North Carolina has historically been a rural state, with most of the population living on farms or in small towns. However, from the late 20th century onward, the state has undergone rapid urbanization, leading to most of North Carolina's residents living in urban and suburban areas, as is the case within most of the United States. In particular, the cities of Charlotte and Raleigh have become major urban centers, with large, diverse, mainly affluent and rapidly growing populations. Most of this growth in diversity has been fueled by immigrants from Latin America, India, and Southeast Asia.

In addition, large numbers of people from the Northeastern United States, Florida and California have moved to the state in recent years. North Carolina was one of the country's fastest growing states in the 1980s and 1990s. The growth rate subsided in the first decade of the 21st century due to changed economic conditions, but it continued to attract new residents.

Ancestry	Percentage	Main article:
African	(21.6%) Of Total)	See African American
American	(13.9%)	See American ancestry
English	(9.5%)	See English American
German	(9.5%)	See German American
Irish	(7.4%)	See Irish American
Scots-Irish	(3.2%)	See Scots-Irish American
Italian	(2.3%)	See Italian American
Scottish	(2.2%)	See Scottish American

County	Seat	2010 Projection
Mecklenburg	Charlotte	925,084
Wake	Raleigh	900,072
Guilford	Greensboro	474,605
Forsyth	Winston-Salem	350,784
Cumberland	Fayetteville	311,777
Durham	Durham	262,256
Buncombe	Asheville	234,697
Gaston	Gastonia	205,489
Union	Monroe	203,527
New Hanover	Wilmington	200,401

=== African-American population ===
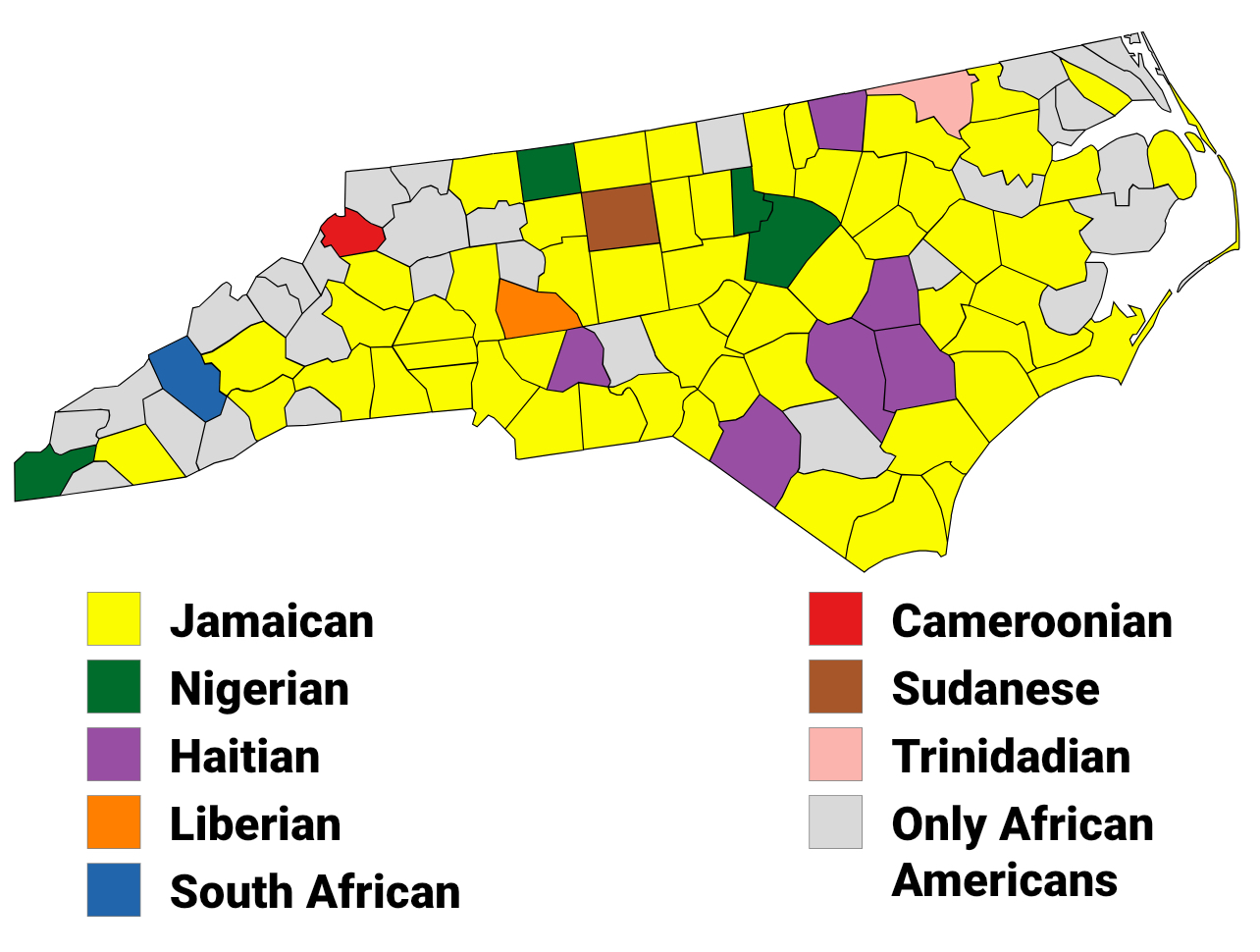
Largest Black alone or in any combination ethnic origin by county in North Carolina besides African American, per the 2020 census

African Americans make up nearly a quarter of North Carolina's population. The number of middle-class Black residents has increased since the 1970s. African Americans are concentrated in the state's eastern Coastal Plain and in parts of the Piedmont Crescent, where they had historically worked and where the most new job opportunities have been. African-American communities number by the hundreds in rural counties in the south-central and northeast North Carolina, and in predominantly Black neighborhoods in the cities of Charlotte, Raleigh, Durham, Greensboro, Fayetteville, Wilmington, and Winston-Salem.

Until the mid-1820s, North Carolina had more small farms and fewer plantations than the adjacent states of South Carolina and Virginia. These "yeoman" farmers were non-slave-holding (or owning few slaves), private land owners of tracts of approximately 500 acres (2 km²) or less. Relatively few Black people live in the state's mountains and rural areas of the western Piedmont. In some mountain counties, the Black population has historically numbered in the few dozens at most.

Free African Americans migrated in the colonial and post-Revolutionary period to frontier areas of North Carolina from Virginia. Detailed family histories of 80% of those counted as "all other free persons" in the 1790–1810 federal census show they were descendants of African Americans free in Virginia during the colonial period. As boundaries were then more permeable, most free African families descended from unions between white women (free or servant) and African men (free, servant or slave). Indians who adopted English customs became part of free African American communities and married into the families. Some of the lighter-skinned descendants formed their own distinct communities, often identifying themselves as Indian or Portuguese to escape effects of the color line.

=== Asian American population ===
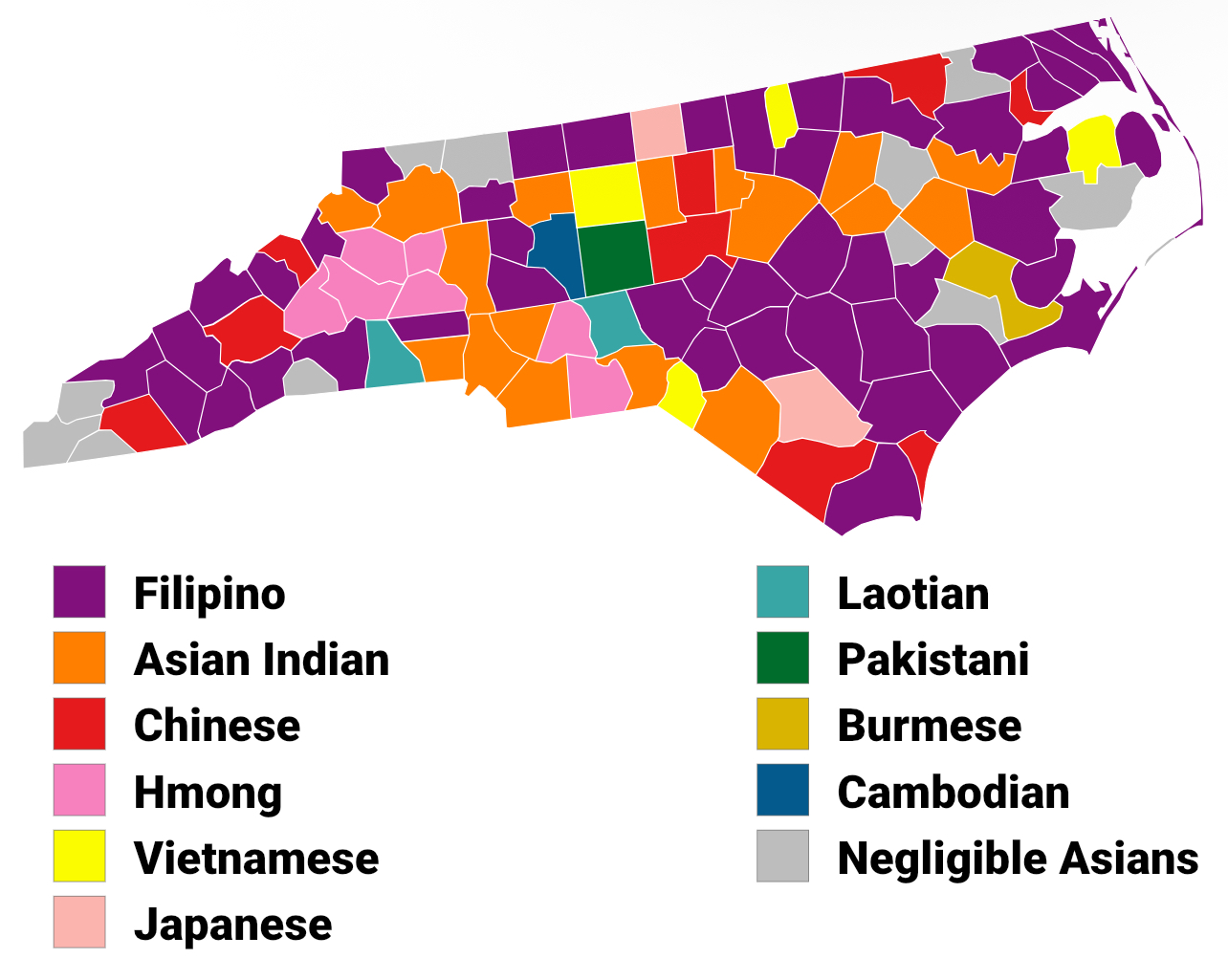
Largest Asian alone or in any combination ethnic origin in North Carolina, per the 2020 census

The state has a rapidly growing proportion of Asian Americans, specifically Indian and Vietnamese; these groups nearly quintupled and tripled, respectively, between 1990 and 2002, as people arrived in the state for new jobs in the growing economy. Recent estimates suggest that the state's Asian-American population has increased significantly since 2000. Indian Americans are one of the most highly educated groups in the US.

North Carolina has the largest population of Montagnards, perhaps 10,000, living in the US. These refugees originate from the Central Highlands of Vietnam. The first group arrived in 1986 as former fighters allied with US Special Forces during the Vietnam War. Today, most of the population lives in Charlotte, Raleigh, and especially Greensboro. Until the 2010 Census, their number has never been accurately identified or counted.

Events during the 1980s in Laos spurred Hmong immigration to North Carolina, as refugees fled wars and Communist rule. They now number 12,000 in the state. A small Hmong farming colony can be found near Marion.

The earliest record of Asian immigration to North Carolina goes back to the mid-19th century when the famous Thai "Siamese" twins – Eng and Chang Bunker, conjoined together at their chests – settled in Mt Airy, North Carolina in 1839. Smaller numbers of Japanese, Filipinos, and Koreans arrived to work as farmers, but many also worked in the Atlantic fishing industries in the early and mid-20th century.

=== European-American population ===
Settled first, the coastal region attracted primarily English immigrants of the early migrations, including indentured servants transported to the colonies and descendants of English who migrated from Virginia. In addition, there were waves of Protestant European immigration, including the British, Irish, French Huguenots, and Swiss Germans who settled New Bern. A concentration of Welsh (usually included with others from Britain and Ireland) settled east of present Fayetteville in the 18th century. For a long time, the wealthier, educated planters of the coastal region dominated the state government.

North Carolinians of Scots-Irish, Scottish and English ancestry are spread across the state. Historically Scots-Irish and Northern English settled mostly in the Piedmont and backcountry. They were the last and most numerous of the immigrant groups from Britain and Ireland before the American Revolution, and settled throughout the Appalachian South, where they could continue their own culture. They were fiercely independent and mostly yeoman farmers.

In the Winston-Salem area, there is a substantial population of ethnic German ancestry (from the modern area of the Czech Republic), descended from immigration of members of the Protestant Moravian Church during the mid-18th century. The Moravians of Winston-Salem are not primarily of Czech ancestry, but mostly of German descent, and members of the Moravian Church in America, a Protestant denomination takes its name from a spiritual movement that began in 15th century Moravia and nearby Bohemia. North Carolina is home to more than 10,000 Bosnian Americans. The Greeks have been around since the early 20th century with 7 Greek Orthodox churches in North Carolina. During the early 20th century, a small group of Orthodox immigrants from Ukraine settled in Pender County.

There is somewhat of a long history of Portuguese settlement along the state's Atlantic coast whose families were fishermen originated from the Azores islands and the country of Portugal, and there are over 50,000 residents of Portuguese descent. The North Carolina coast also attracted Basque fishermen from their homeland in Northern Spain and southwest France. Seasonal residents, known as "snowbirds", live in coastal sections and beach towns every winter. The majority are Canadians, either English and French speaking.

=== Latino-American population ===
Since 1990, the state has seen an increase in the number of Hispanics/Latinos. Once chiefly employed as migrant labor, Hispanic residents of the 1990s and early 21st century have been attracted to low-skilled jobs as the first step on the economic ladder. As a result, growing numbers of Hispanic immigrants are settling in the state. The majority of these are from Mexico, but also from Puerto Rico, and to a lesser degree from other Caribbean and Central American countries. There are also significant amounts of Hispanics moving to North Carolina from other states, such as Puerto Ricans from the Northeast. In Hispanic neighborhoods such as Eastland in Charlotte, Mexican Americans have become the ethnic majority. Newly formed barrios in the Raleigh area continue a transplanted Latin American culture. In 2005, the Pew Hispanic Center estimated that 300,000 — roughly 65 percent of North Carolina's Latino population — are undocumented immigrants, based on the Census Bureau's population estimates. The population has grown from 77,726 in 1990 to 517,617 in 2005, an average increase of 13.5% per year.

=== Native-American population ===
North Carolina has the highest American Indian population on the East Coast. The estimated population figures for Native Americans in North Carolina (as of 2004) is 110,198. To date, North Carolina recognizes eight Native American tribal nations within its state borders:

- The Eastern Band of Cherokee Indians were federally recognized in 1868 and received state recognition in 1889. The Eastern Cherokee live in eastern Swain County, as well as Graham and Jackson counties, and have roughly 13,400 enrolled members, most of whom live on a reservation properly called the Qualla Boundary. The Reservation is slightly more than 56,000 acres (230 km²), and is held in trust by the federal government specifically for the Eastern Band of Cherokee Indians.
- The Lumbee Tribe of North Carolina, the largest in the state with more than 55,000 members, was recognized by the state in 1885. In 1956, Congress recognized the Lumbee but denied them benefits received by other federally recognized tribes. Since the 1980s, the Lumbee have sought full federal recognition and achieved it in December 2025. The Lumbee are concentrated chiefly in the southeastern portions of the state in Robeson, Scotland, Hoke and Cumberland counties.
- The Haliwa-Saponi Indian Tribe received state recognition in 1965. The tribe comprises a little more than 3,800 enrolled members who reside in northeastern North Carolina's Halifax and Warren counties.
- The Waccamaw-Siouan Tribe received state recognition in 1971. The almost 2,000 members are located in the mid-Atlantic North Carolina counties of Bladen and Columbus.
- The Croatan Indians of Samson County first received state recognition in 1911. North Carolina rescinded recognition in 1913 but formally recognized the Coharie Intra-tribal Council, Inc. in 1971. The population of 1,781 enrolled members is located in Sampson and Harnett counties.
- The Sappony received state recognition in 1911 as the Indians of Person County. In 2003 they officially received state permission to change their name to the Sappony Tribe. They have 850 enrolled members.
- The Occaneechi Band of the Saponi Nation received state recognition in 2002. They have a population of 800 members who reside in Orange and Alamance counties.
- The Meherrin Nation are a tribe of Iroquoian-descent located primarily in rural northeastern Hertford, Bertie, and Gates counties, with a population of 557 enrolled members.

Only five states: (California, Arizona, Oklahoma, New Mexico, and Texas), have larger Native American populations than North Carolina. The total Native American and Alaska Native population in the United States is 2,824,751, or 0.95% of the total.

=== Ancestries ===
In 2020, the state's foreign born population was 8.3%.

Ancestry	Number (As of 2022)	%
American	849,003	7.9
Arab	47,505	0.4
Czech	16,520	0.2
Danish	15,320	0.1
Dutch	71,671	0.7
English	1,350,554	12.6
French (except Basque)	143,879	1.3
French Canadian	29,725	0.3
German	985,456	9.2
Greek	32,641	0.3
Hungarian	25,436	0.2
Irish	885,017	8.3
Italian	335,188	3.1
Lithuanian	11,426	0.1
Norwegian	45,756	0.4
Polish	150,338	1.4
Portuguese	17,479	0.2
Russian	38,494	0.4
Scotch-Irish	184,128	1.7
Scottish	236,278	2.2
Slovak	10,838	0.1
Subsaharan African	148,172	1.4
Swedish	52,510	0.5
Swiss	17,406	0.2
Ukrainian	24,698	0.2
Welsh	52,588	0.5
West Indian (excluding Hispanic origin groups)	57,848	0.5

== Languages ==
As of 2010, 89.66% (7,750,904) of North Carolina residents age 5 and older spoke English at home as a primary language, while 6.93% (598,756) spoke Spanish, 0.32% (27,310) French, 0.27% (23,204) German, and Chinese (including Mandarin) was spoken as a main language by 0.27% (23,072) of the population over the age of five. In total, 10.34% (893,735) of North Carolina's population age 5 and older spoke a first language other than English.

Top 10 Non-English Languages Spoken in North Carolina
Language	Percentage of population (as of 2010)
Spanish	6.93%
French	0.32%
German	0.27%
Chinese (including Mandarin)	0.27%
Vietnamese	0.24%
Arabic	0.17%
Korean	0.16%
Tagalog	0.13%
Hindi	0.12%
Gujarati	0.11%
Russian	0.11%
Hmong	0.11%
Italian	0.08%
Japanese	0.08%

== Religion ==
North Carolina, like other Southern states, has traditionally been overwhelmingly Protestant. By the late 19th century, the largest Protestant denomination were Southern Baptists. In recent times, the rapid influx of northerners and immigrants from Latin America, is steadily increasing the number of Roman Catholics and Jews in the state. Baptists still remain the single largest church within the state.

The growing diversity of religious groups in North Carolina is most visible in the state's larger urban areas, such as Charlotte and Raleigh-Durham. It is in these cities and suburbs, that most of the state's new immigrants and residents have settled. However, statewide, Southern Baptists remain the dominant Christian church. The second-largest Protestant church in North Carolina are Methodists, who are strong in the northern Piedmont, and especially in populous Guilford County. There are also substantial numbers of Quakers in Guilford County, and northeastern North Carolina.

The Presbyterians, historically Scots-Irish, have had a strong presence in Charlotte, the state's largest city, and in Scotland County.

Jews began arriving in North Carolina in the early to mid-19th century. Primarily German Jews, these early immigrants established centers in the coastal cities of Wilmington and New Bern. It was not until the late 19th to early 20th century that Eastern European Jews began to arrive in large numbers to Piedmont cities such as Charlotte and Greensboro. Today, most Jewish communities in North Carolina are centered around large Piedmont cities such as Charlotte, Raleigh, Greensboro, and Winston-Salem. In recent years, Western North Carolina has also seen an influx of Jews, who have relocated to places such as Asheville and Boone from Florida and the Northeast United States. It is estimated there are approximately 30,000 Jewish residents in North Carolina, who constitute around 0.3% of the state's population.

The religious affiliations of the people of North Carolina, as of 2001, are shown below:

- Christian: 79%
  - Protestant: 57%
    - Baptist: 38%
    - Methodist: 9%
    - Presbyterian: 3%
    - Lutheran: 2%
    - Other Protestant: 5%
  - Roman Catholic: 10%
  - Other Christian such as Non-denominational, Pentecostal, and Mormon: 12%
- Judaism: 1%
- Muslim: 1%
- Other religions: 3%
- Non-religious: 10%
- Refused to answer: 7%
