= St. Joseph's Episcopal Church (Fayetteville, North Carolina) =

Historic church in North Carolina, United States

- U.S. National Register of Historic Places
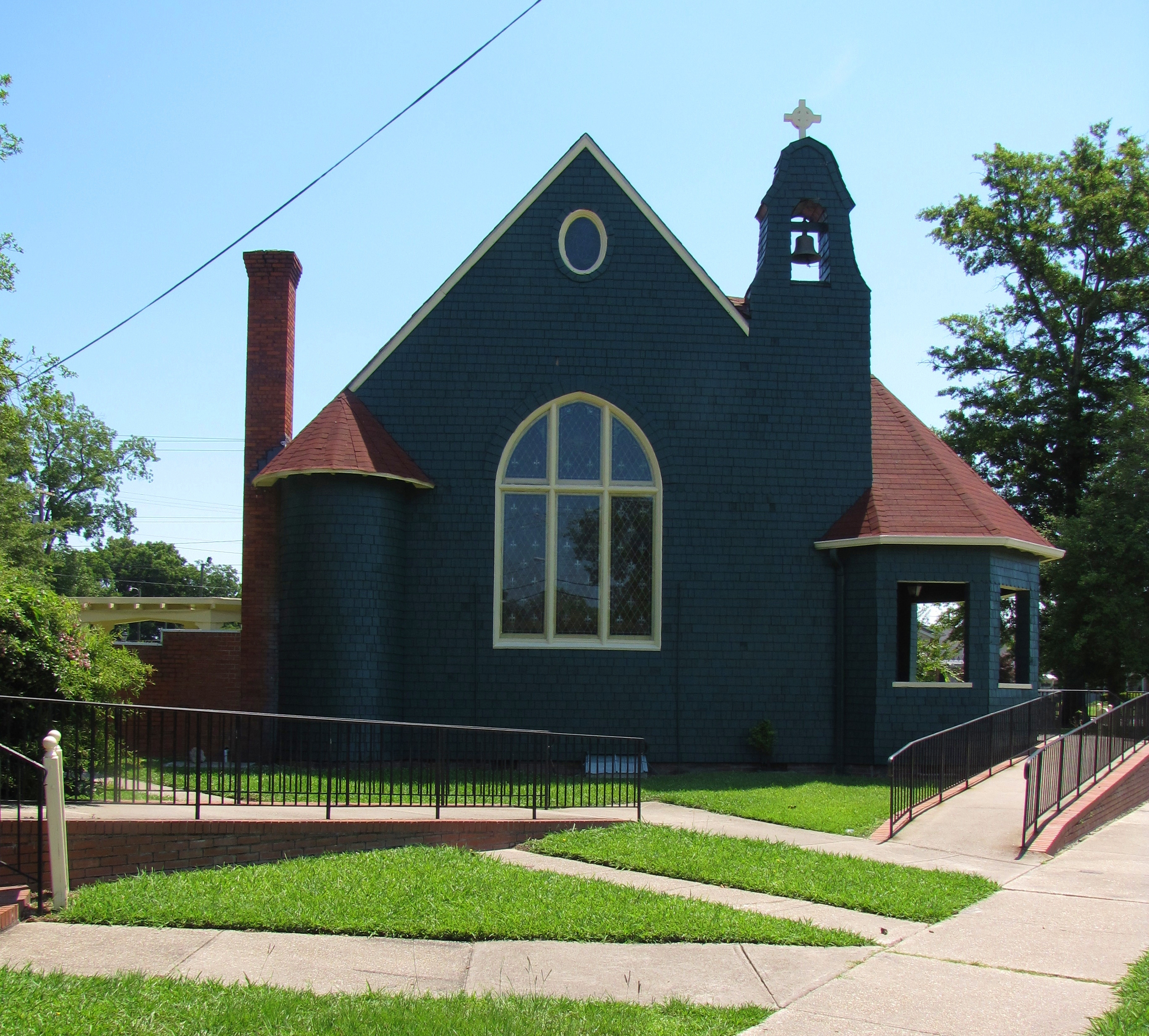
- St. Joseph's Episcopal Church

- Location within North Carolina Location within the United States
- Location: Ramsey and Moore Sts., Fayetteville, North Carolina
- Coordinates: 35°3′21″N 78°52′41″W
- Area: 2 acres (0.81 ha)
- Built: 1896
- Architectural style: Late Gothic Revival, Queen Anne, Mission/Spanish Revival
- NRHP reference No.: 82003447
- Added to NRHP: June 01, 1982

St. Joseph’s Episcopal Church is a historic Black Episcopal church complex located in Fayetteville, Cumberland County, North Carolina. Chartered in 1873, it is the second-oldest Episcopal congregation in Fayetteville. The historic church building, located at the corner of Ramsey and Moore Streets, was constructed in 1896. It is a low, shingled, Queen Anne–style frame church incorporating English Gothic and Spanish architectural accents. Notable features include a three-part stained-glass window, a deeply projecting semi-octagonal chancel, and a steeply pitched main roof with exposed rafters. Also contributing to the historic character of the property are the Parish House and the Parsonage.

Beyond its architectural significance, St. Joseph’s has played a vital role in the educational and civil rights history of Fayetteville’s African American community. In its early years, the church served as a school for African American children at a time when educational opportunities were severely limited by segregation. The church also functioned as an important meeting place for the NAACP during the early twentieth century and was a hub for organizing and civic engagement. Prominent African American leaders, including W. E. B. Du Bois, visited St. Joseph’s in the 1920s and participated in or supported NAACP meetings held there.

St. Joseph’s Episcopal Church was listed on the National Register of Historic Places in 1982.Most recently, the Rev. Dr. Skip Walker served as Priest-in-Charge of St. Joseph’s from 2023-2026.
