= Mecklenburg Investment Company Building =

Historic building in North Carolina, US

- U.S. National Register of Historic Places
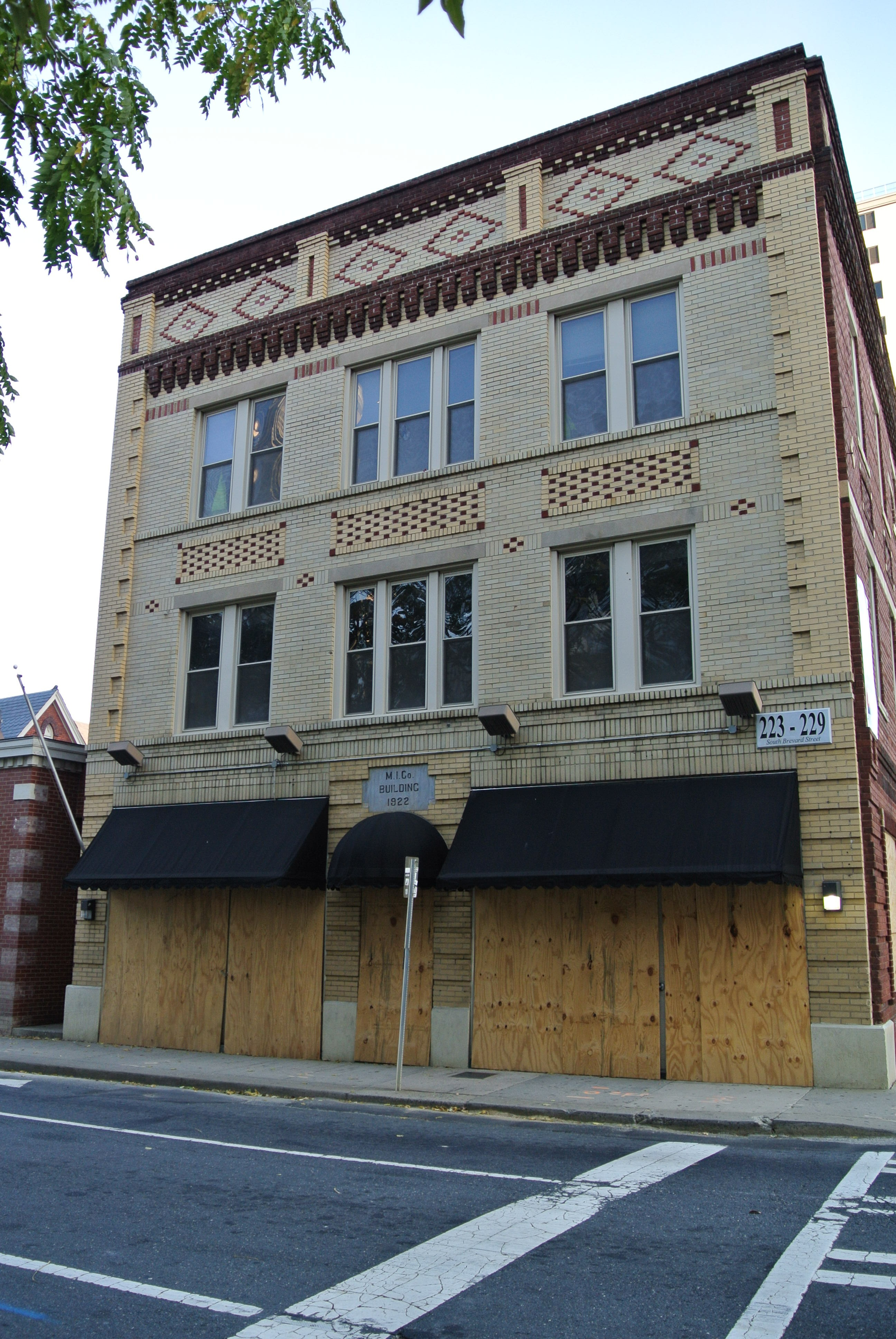
- Mecklenburg Investment Company Building, October 2016

- Location within North Carolina Location within the United States
- Location: 233 S. Brevard St., Charlotte, North Carolina
- Coordinates: 35°13′22″N 80°50′32″W
- Area: less than one acre
- Built: 1922
- Built by: Smith, William W.
- NRHP reference No.: 82003486
- Added to NRHP: August 19, 1982

Mecklenburg Investment Company Building is a historic commercial building located at Charlotte, Mecklenburg County, North Carolina. It was built in 1922, and is a three-story, three bay by six bay, red brick building. It measures 42 feet wide and 98 feet deep. The building is associated with the "New Negro" movement and is located in the historic African-American community of Brooklyn.

It was added to the National Register of Historic Places in 1982.
