= Gaston Chapel =

Historic chapel in North Carolina, United States

- U.S. National Register of Historic Places
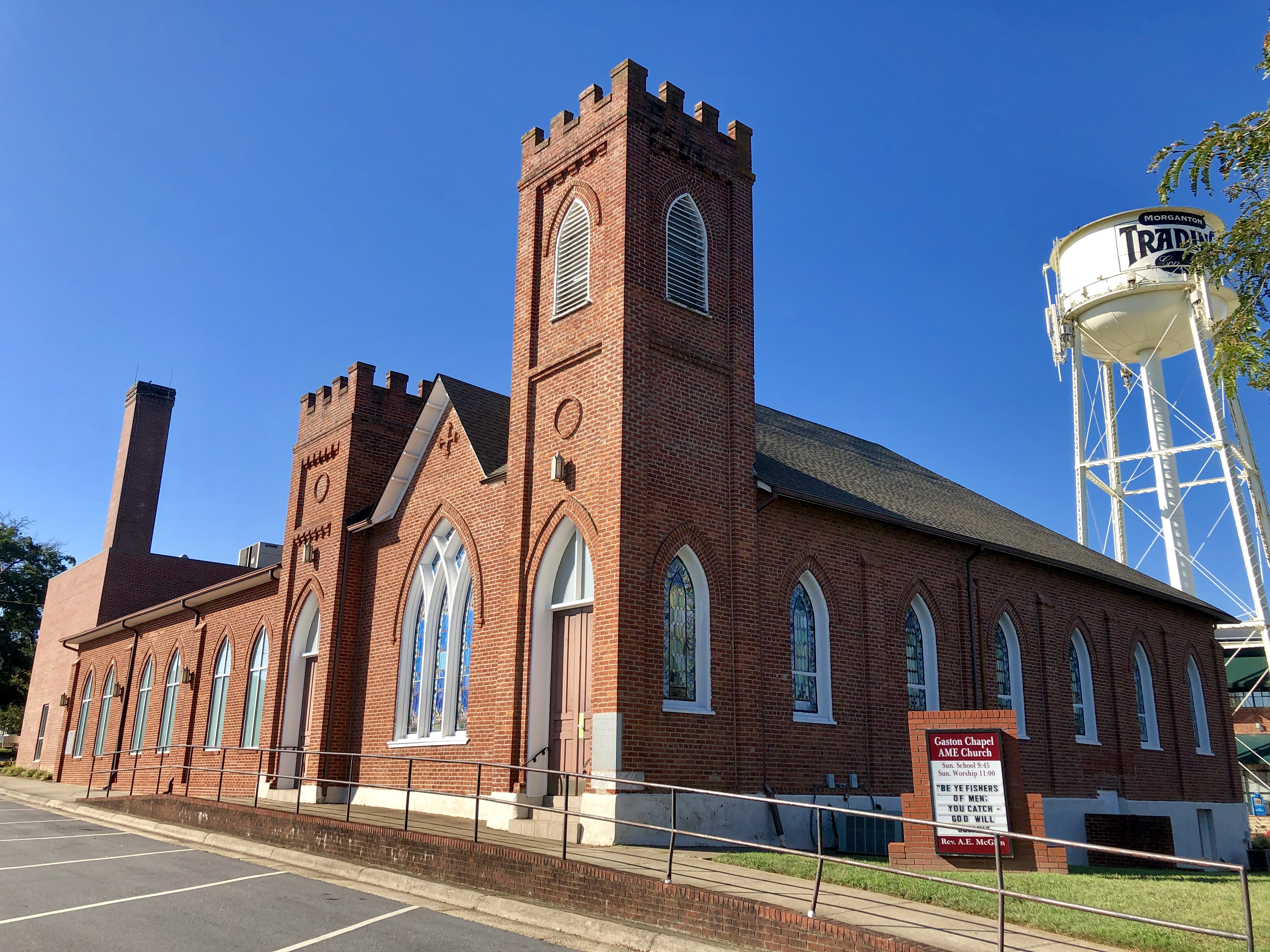
- Gaston Chapel, August 2019

- Location within North Carolina Location within the United States
- Location: 100 Bouchelle St., Morganton, North Carolina
- Coordinates: 35°44′51″N 81°41′14″W
- Area: 0.6 acres (0.24 ha)
- Built: 1900
- Architectural style: Late Gothic Revival
- NRHP reference No.: 84000077
- Added to NRHP: October 11, 1984

Gaston Chapel is a historic African Methodist Episcopal church located at 100 Bouchelle Street in Morganton, Burke County, North Carolina. It was built from 1900 to 1911, and is a brick church building with a high-pitched hip roof and Late Gothic Revival style design influences. It features a Gothic-arched tripartite stained-glass window. It is the oldest extant, and first substantial, African-American church structure in Burke County.

It was listed on the National Register of Historic Places in 1984.
