= William Penn High School (Philadelphia) =

Location
- 1333 N Broad Street; Philadelphia, Pennsylvania 19122; United States; 39.974°N 75.159°W

Information
- Type: Public high school
- School district: School District of Philadelphia
- Principal: Patricia Randzo
- Faculty: 65.3 (on FTE basis)
- Grades: 9 to 12
- Enrollment: 1204 (2005-06)
- Student to teacher ratio: 18.4
- Campus type: Urban

William Penn High School was a public high school serving grades 9-12, located at 1333 N Broad St, Philadelphia, Pennsylvania. It was a part of the School District of Philadelphia (SDP).

== History ==
The school opened in 1973.

In 2009 Penn had 633 students. That year, the school district proposed closing Penn, because its declining enrollment was far below the building capacity and because the building was in poor condition. The district proposed rezoning Penn zone residents who were also in the Clymer School zone to Simon Gratz High School, and it proposed rezoning Penn zoned residents who were also in the zones of Dunbar, Ferguson, Harrison, and Hartranft to Benjamin Franklin High School.

Some individuals opposed to the closing argued that if Penn was closed and its students were moved to Franklin, students would engage in "turf warfare" and the abandoned school building would become a haven for criminal activity. The closing was approved.

In 2014 Temple University paid $15 million to acquire the Penn site. In February 2015 the Philadelphia City Planning Commission approved the demolition of the school. Demolition began in December 2015, with demolition of the campus's east side scheduled to end in February of the following year, and with the west side demolished by the summer of 2016. Temple planned to install an athletic center on the east side. Athletic activities were scheduled to begin on the former Penn site in October 2016.

== Campus ==
Located near the intersection of Broad Street and Girard Avenue, the school was accessible via local public transit, including the Girard subway station and two major bus routes. The surrounding area featured commercial amenities, including local eateries, fast-food chains, a gas station, and a pharmacy.

The campus included five interconnected buildings linked by bridges. Before a significant decline in enrollment, the school accommodated a large student body, prompting the use of floor markings in major hallways to manage student traffic. The facilities included two full-sized lunchrooms on the second floor of a multipurpose building, an on-site childcare facility on the ground floor to support student parents, and a greenhouse on the top floor.

Penn housed an Olympic sized swimming pool that only went from three to four feet to teach students to swim. There was also a diving pool with a depth of twelve feet for students that were comfortable with swimming. There was a three-story rock wall in the gym where basketball games were held. A ping pong and tennis room and state of the art gym equipment was available to the students.

== Structure ==
Penn had five programs called SLCs (Small Learning Communities). Communications, Masterminds, Arts, Business and Health. Each SLC focused on specific educational requirements. Communications held classes for web design, desktop publishing, photography, television editing, television broadcasting, computer science, newspaper editing, CISCO classes, etc. Penn had a professional television studio and editing software, along with top notch computer labs and a dark room for photography

Art SLC had two huge two-story art rooms with kilns to harden certain art projects. A professional dance studio with a certified teacher that taught various dance art. There was a music room with every musical instrument possible and had certified instructors to teach and lead bands.

Health SLC had various health courses and had special biology, and chemistry classes.

Business SLC had top notch business courses and typing classes.

Masterminds was once an SLC for students that wanted to go into a career in Law and African American studies. In 2001, it was changed into an SLC to get 9th graders ready for high school life.

There were so many students at one time, the auditorium had to be used one grade or one SLC at a time according to the material being addressed. On the right of the auditorium were separate banquet rooms for award ceremonies and festivals for the students.

This school also had a section specifically for students in special education and they were kept in a safe but open environment for them to learn and grow without being forced to mingle with the other students.

A list of every class that was given to students at its peak in 2004 will be available shortly, including the distinguished classes such as elementary functions. The class of 2004 was the most recent biggest graduating class.

Faculty and students were able to park their cars in the garage located under the school for safe off street parking.

The schools color was black, white and silver with the lion as a mascot. In the fall of 2000, uniforms were implemented in this school for the first time. Students had to wear black slacks with a white or gray polo shirt and black shoes.

William Penn Exemplary Demonstration High was opened in 1970. The 1970 plaque on the front of the building housed a time capsule with the hope one day students can view the contents inside.
