= William Penn High School (North Carolina) =

Historic school building in North Carolina, United States

- U.S. National Register of Historic Places
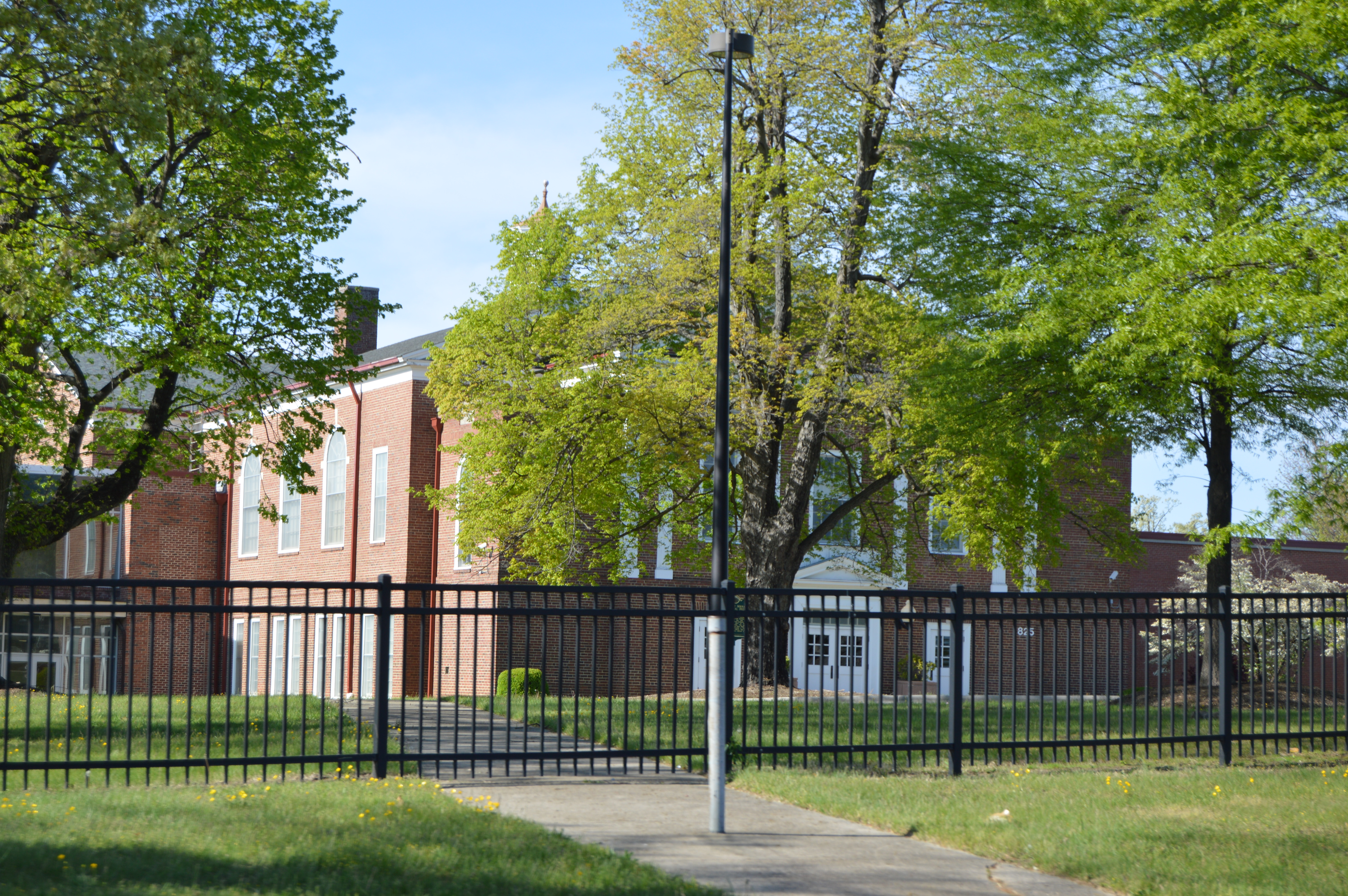
- Seen from the street

- Location within North Carolina Location within the United States
- Location: Washington Dr., High Point, North Carolina
- Coordinates: 35°57′43″N 79°59′51″W
- Area: 6.5 acres (2.6 ha)
- Built: 1910-1911, 1929-1930
- Architectural style: Colonial Revival
- NRHP reference No.: 78001959
- Added to NRHP: November 16, 1978

William Penn High School, also known as High Point Normal & Industrial Institute, is a historic high school for African-American students located at High Point, Guilford County, North Carolina. The high school building was built in 1910–1911, and enlarged and renovated in 1929–1930. It is a two-story, 12 classroom Colonial Revival-style brick building. It has a projecting three-bay entrance pavilion. Two other buildings associated with the High Point Normal & Industrial Institute are on the property. The Institute was established by Quakers in 1891. They were built about 1910 and are a gable end frame structure sheathed in corrugated metal with a distinctive monitor roof and a brick building with a low pitched roof. The school closed in 1968 and was re-opened in 2003 as an arts magnet high school, Penn-Griffin School for the Arts.

On February 11th, 1960, William Penn High School students organized what is thought to be the first sit-in organized by high school students protesting segregation. The school was listed on the National Register of Historic Places in 1978.

== Notable alumni ==
- John Coltrane — jazz saxophonist and composer
- Gwendolyn Ann Magee — African American fiber artist
