= National Register of Historic Places listings in Warren County, North Carolina =

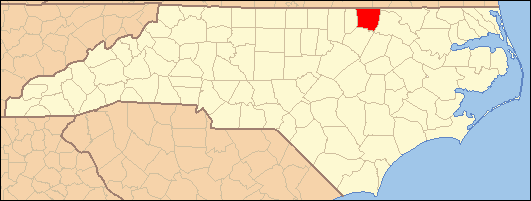

This list includes properties and districts listed on the National Register of Historic Places in Warren County, North Carolina. Click the "Map of all coordinates" link to the right to view an online map of all properties and districts with latitude and longitude coordinates in the table below.

== Current listings ==
This National Park Service list is complete through NPS recent listings posted May 1, 2026.

	Name on the Register	Image	Date listed	Location	City or town	Description
1	All Saints Episcopal Church		August 8, 2025 (#100012078)	201 West Franklin Street; 36°23′50″N 78°09′25″W	Warrenton	
2	Mary Ann Browne House		July 24, 1986 (#86001912)	NC 1530; 36°24′51″N 77°59′13″W	Vaughan	
3	Buck Spring Plantation		October 15, 1970 (#70000480)	N of Vaughan on SR 1348; 36°28′50″N 77°59′52″W	Vaughan	
4	Buxton Place		April 22, 1993 (#93000323)	NC 58 W side, 0.2 miles N of jct. with NC 1628; 36°14′30″N 78°06′22″W	Inez	
5	Chapel of the Good Shepherd	Chapel of the Good Shepherd	September 16, 1977 (#77001013)	E of Ridgeway; 36°26′10″N 78°13′22″W	Ridgeway	
6	Cherry Hill		November 5, 1974 (#74001384)	SE of Warrenton on NC 58; 36°16′08″N 78°05′42″W	Inez	
7	Coleman-White House		October 25, 1973 (#73001380)	Halifax and Hall Sts. 36°23′36″N 78°09′13″W	Warrenton	
8	Dalkeith		December 16, 1974 (#74001382)	SW of Arcola off NC 43; 36°16′47″N 77°59′12″W	Arcola	
9	Green Duke House	Green Duke House	August 7, 1974 (#74001383)	SE of Manson off SR 1100; 36°24′52″N 78°13′51″W	Manson	
10	Elgin	Elgin	February 6, 1973 (#73001381)	SE of Warrenton on SR 1509; 36°23′06″N 78°06′09″W	Warrenton	
11	William J. Hawkins House	William J. Hawkins House	May 22, 1978 (#78001982)	West of Norlina on SR 1103; 36°25′45″N 78°14′41″W	Ridgeway	
12	Hebron Methodist Church	Hebron Methodist Church	April 19, 1984 (#84002547)	SR 1306; 36°30′31″N 78°05′02″W	Oakville	
13	Lake O'Woods		January 19, 1979 (#79001760)	S of Inez of SR 1512; 36°18′11″N 78°05′10″W	Inez	
14	Liberia School		May 18, 2005 (#05000438)	4.5 miles S of Warrenton, Sw side of NC 58; 36°21′42″N 78°06′03″W	Warrenton	
15	Little Manor		April 24, 1973 (#73001378)	Belle Shearin Rd., south of Littleton; 36°25′09″N 77°54′54″W	Littleton	
16	Reedy Rill		December 3, 1974 (#74001385)	S of Warrenton off SR 1600; 36°20′47″N 78°09′29″W	Warrenton	
17	Shady Oaks		March 15, 1976 (#76001346)	SE of Warrenton on SR 1600; 36°22′49″N 78°08′32″W	Warrenton	
18	Dr. Charles and Susan Skinner House and Outbuildings		October 6, 2000 (#00001186)	NC 1528, 0.25 miles SW of NC 158; 36°25′37″N 77°56′16″W	Littleton	
19	Sledge-Hayley House	Sledge-Hayley House	April 17, 1980 (#80002904)	Frankin and Hayley Sts. 36°23′52″N 78°09′39″W	Warrenton	
20	Mansfield Thornton House	Mansfield Thornton House	December 2, 1977 (#77001014)	SE of Warrenton; 36°23′12″N 78°08′46″W	Warrenton	
21	Tusculum		October 23, 1974 (#74001386)	SE of Warrenton off SR 1635; 36°17′04″N 78°01′07″W	Arcola	
22	Warren County Community Center		August 8, 2025 (#100012077)	111 West Franklin Street; 36°23′49″N 78°09′23″W	Warrenton	
23	Warren County Fire Tower		March 3, 2000 (#00000164)	4.5 miles S of Warrenton on NC 58 S 36°21′39″N 78°04′52″W	Liberia	
24	Warren County Training School		April 19, 2006 (#06000294)	East side of NC 1300, 0.8 N of NC 1372; 36°30′56″N 78°09′59″W	Wise	
25	Warrenton Historic District	Warrenton Historic District	August 11, 1976 (#76001347)	U.S. 401; also roughly bounded by East Bute, Church. West Franklin, Halifax, North and South Hall, Harris, Hawkins, East Macon, North and South Main, and Warren Streets; the west ends of Fairview, Graham, and Rodwell Streets; Battle and Eaton Avenues; and Hazelwood Drive; 36°23′42″N 78°09′18″W	Warrenton	Second set of addresses represent boundary changes approved April 4, 2024.
26	John Watson House		December 28, 1990 (#90001954)	Petway Burwell Rd., 1/4 miles W of NC 401; 36°21′50″N 78°10′58″W	Warrenton	
27	Solomon and Kate Williams Jr. House		September 25, 2003 (#03000968)	Jct. of NC 58 and NC 1626; 36°16′28″N 78°05′41″W	Inez	

== See also ==
- National Register of Historic Places listings in North Carolina
- List of National Historic Landmarks in North Carolina
