= Watson House =

Watson House may refer to:

in the United States

(by state then city)

- Laura Watson House, Gainesville, Alabama, listed on the National Register of Historic Places (NRHP)
- William Henry Watson Homestead, Denmark, Arkansas, listed on the NRHP
- Watson House (Hamburg, Arkansas), listed on the NRHP
- Watson-Sawyer House, Hamburg, Arkansas, listed on the NRHP
- Watson Log Cabin, Tahoe City, California, listed on the NRHP
- Watson House (Denver, Colorado), a Denver Landmark
- Gov. William T. Watson Mansion, Milford, Delaware, listed on the NRHP
- Harman-Watson-Matthews House, Greenville, Georgia, listed on the NRHP
- Thomas E. Watson House, Thomson, Georgia, listed on the NRHP
- Watson House (Charlestown, Indiana), listed on the NRHP
- John Watson House (Hiram, Maine), listed on the NRHP
- Abraham Watson House, Cambridge, Massachusetts, listed on the NRHP
- William H. and Sabrina Watson House, Lapeer, Michigan, listed on the NRHP
- Henry R. Watson House, Saline, Michigan, listed on the NRHP
- Dwight and Clara Watson House, Saint Paul, Minnesota, listed on the NRHP
- Samuel Stewart Watson House, St. Charles, Missouri, listed on the NRHP
- Isaac Watson House, Trenton, New Jersey, listed on the NRHP
- Watson House (Lockport, New York), listed on the NRHP
- James Watson House, New York, New York, listed on the NRHP
- Watson House, Columbia University, New York City
- Elkanah Watson House, Port Kent, New York, listed on the NRHP
- H. C. Watson House, Rockingham, North Carolina, listed on the NRHP
- John Watson House (Warrenton, North Carolina), listed on the NRHP
- T. Max Watson House, Forest City, North Carolina, listed on the NRHP
- Watson-Sanders House, Smithfield, North Carolina, listed on the NRHP
- McCauley-Watson House, Union Ridge, North Carolina, listed on the NRHP
- John Watson House (Warrenton, North Carolina), listed on the NRHP
- John N. and Cornelia Watson House, Lakeview, Oregon, listed on the NRHP
- Watson-Price Farmstead, Philomath, Oregon, listed on the NRHP
- Watson-Curtze Mansion, Erie, Pennsylvania, listed on the NRHP
- Clarkson-Watson House, Philadelphia, Pennsylvania, listed on the NRHP
- Sally Watson House, Philadelphia, Pennsylvania, listed on the NRHP
- Patrick B. Watson House, Park City, Utah, listed on the NRHP
- Irinda Watson House, Park City, Utah, listed on the NRHP
- Watson House (Chincoteague Island, Virginia)
- Old Watson Homestead House, Smithtown, West Virginia, listed on the NRHP

== See also ==
- John Watson House (disambiguation)
