= Hawkins House =

Hawkins House may refer to:

in Ireland

- Hawkins House, former head office of the Department of Health (Ireland)

in the United States (by state then city)

- Hawkins House (Prescott, Arizona), listed on the NRHP in Yavapai County, Arizona
- Hawkins House (Foreman, Arkansas), listed on the NRHP in Little River County, Arkansas
- Dr. M.C. Hawkins House, Parkdale, Arkansas, listed on the NRHP in Ashley County, Arkansas
- Joel and Rena Hawkins House, Hollister, California, listed on the NRHP in San Benito County, California
- Hawkins House of Burgers, Watts, Los Angeles, California, burger restaurant
- Hull-Hawkins House, Live Oak, Florida, NRHP-listed
- Baker-Hawkins House, Louisville, Kentucky, listed on the NRHP in Portland, Louisville, Kentucky
- Hawkins House (Scott County, Kentucky), listed on the NRHP as Cantrill House
- Nathan Hawkins House, Kirksville, Kentucky, listed on the NRHP in Madison County, Kentucky
- Lorenzo D. Hawkins House, Stoneham, Massachusetts, NRHP-listed
- Dr. E.P. Hawkins Clinic, Hospital and House, Montrose, Minnesota, listed on the NRHP in Wright County, Minnesota
- Leport-Toupin House, Carson City, Nevada, also known as Hawkins House, NRHP-listed
- Hawkins House (Reno, Nevada), NRHP-listed
- Hawkins Hall, Plattsburgh, New York, NRHP-listed
- Hawkins Homestead, Stony Brook, New York, NRHP-listed, also known as Zachariah Hawkins Homestead
- Robert Hawkins Homestead, Yaphank, New York, NRHP-listed
- Pleasant Hill/Hawkins House, Middleburg, North Carolina, listed on the NRHP in Vance County, North Carolina
- Hawkins-Hartness House, Raleigh, North Carolina, listed on the NRHP in Wake County, North Carolina
- William J. Hawkins House, Ridgeway, North Carolina, listed on the NRHP in Warren County, North Carolina
- Hawkins House (Houston, Texas), listed on the NRHP in Harris County, Texas
- William and Eliza Hawkins House, Beaver, Utah, listed on the NRHP in Beaver County, Utah
- Munro-Hawkins House, Shaftsbury Center, Vermont, listed on the NRHP in Bennington County, Vermont
- E. B. Hawkins House, Fayetteville, West Virginia, listed on the NRHP in Fayette County, West Virginia
