= John Watson House =

John Watson House may refer to:

- John Watson House (Hiram, Maine), listed on the National Register of Historic Places (NRHP) in Oxford County
- John Watson House (Warrenton, North Carolina), NRHP-listed
- John N. and Cornelia Watson House, Lakeview, Oregon, NRHP-listed

== See also ==
- Watson House (disambiguation)
