= Liberia, North Carolina =

- Unincorporated community
- Location within North Carolina Location within the United States
- Coordinates: 36°21′24″N 78°05′47″W
- Country: United States
- State: North Carolina
- County: Warren
- Elevation: 400 ft (120 m)
- Time zone: UTC-5 (Eastern (EST))
  - Summer (DST): UTC-4 (EDT)
- Area code: 252
- GNIS feature ID: 1021140

Liberia is an unincorporated community in Warren County, North Carolina, United States. The community is located at the junction of North Carolina Highway 43 and North Carolina Highway 58, which connect Rocky Mount and Wilson respectively to the county seat at Warrenton. A predominantly African-American community, Liberia was founded after the Civil War; it was named for the African nation of Liberia, where many freed slaves migrated to after the war.

The Liberia School and the Warren County Fire Tower, which are both listed on the National Register of Historic Places, are located in the vicinity of Liberia.
