= Tusculum (disambiguation) =

Tusculum is a ruined Roman city in the Latium region of Italy.

Tusculum may also refer to:

== Places ==
- Tusculum, Potts Point, a heritage-listed house in Potts Point, Sydney, Australia

=== United States ===
- Tusculum (Princeton, New Jersey), a 1773 country estate, listed on the National Register of Historic Places
- Tusculum (Arcola, North Carolina), an 1835 plantation house, listed on the National Register of Historic Places
- Tusculum (Amherst, Virginia), a c. 1805 house, listed on the National Register of Historic Places
- Tusculum, Tennessee, a city
  - Tusculum College, a university in Tennessee
- Tusculum, Nashville, Tennessee, a neighborhood

== Other uses ==
- Counts of Tusculum, secular noblemen in Latium during the tenth through twelfth centuries
- Battle of Tusculum, an 1167 battle between the Holy Roman Empire and the Commune of Rome

== See also ==
- Columbia-Tusculum, Cincinnati, Ohio, a neighborhood
