= Dalkeith (disambiguation) =

Dalkeith is a town in Midlothian, Scotland.

Dalkeith may also refer to:

Related to Dalkeith, Scotland:

- Dalkeith Palace
- Dalkeith Rugby Football Club
- Dalkeith Thistle F.C.
- Dalkeith High School
- Earl of Dalkeith, subsidiary title of the Duke of Buccleuch.

Other uses:

- Dalkeith, Western Australia, a suburb of Perth
- Dalkeith, Ontario, Canada
- Dalkeith, Florida, U.S., an unincorporated town
- Dalkeith (Arcola, North Carolina), U.S., a historic plantation house
- Dalkeith (film), a 2002 Australian film
- Dalkeith Property, a historic house in the Sydney suburb of Cremorne
