= Albert Gamaliel Jones =

American architect

Albert Gamaliel Jones (c. 1812 – c. 1880) was a notable "house carpenter" from Warren County, North Carolina. He built "distinctive" Greek Revival plantation houses and college buildings.

A number of his works are listed on the U.S. National Register of Historic Places.

Works include:

- The Columns, Jones Dr., Murfreesboro, North Carolina (Jones, Albert G.), NRHP-listed
- Fuller House, 307 N. Main St., Louisburg, North Carolina (Jones, Albert Gamaliel), NRHP-listed
- Lake O'Woods, S of Inez of SR 1512, Inez, North Carolina (Jones, Gamaliel Albert), NRHP-listed
- Louisburg Historic District, roughly bounded by Allen Lane, Main and Cedar Sts., Franklin, Elm, and King St., Louisburg, North Carolina (Jones, Albert Gemaliel), NRHP-listed
- Main Building, Louisburg College, (1857), Louisburg College campus, Louisburg, North Carolina (Jones, Albert Gamaliel), NRHP-listed
- Myrick–Yeates–Vaughan House, 327 W. Main St., Murfreesboro, North Carolina (Jones, Albert Gamaliel), NRHP-listed
- Dr. Charles and Susan Skinner House and Outbuildings, NC 1528, 0.25 mi. SW of NC 158, Littleton, North Carolina (Jones, Albert G.), NRHP-listed
