= Weldon Nathaniel Edwards =

American legislator (1788–1873)

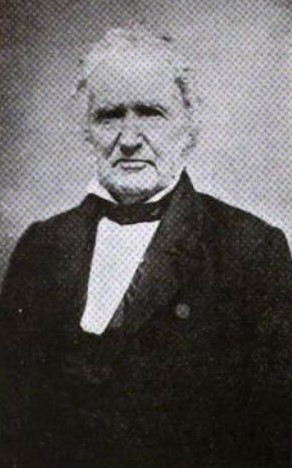

31st President pro tempore of the North Carolina Senate
- In office 1850–1852
- Preceded by: Andrew Joyner
- Succeeded by: Warren Winslow

Member of the North Carolina Senate
- In office 1850
- In office 1833–1844

Member of the U.S. House of Representatives from North Carolina's 6th district
- In office February 7, 1816 – March 3, 1827
- Preceded by: Nathaniel Macon
- Succeeded by: Daniel Turner

Member of the North Carolina House of Representatives
- In office 1814–1815

Personal details
- Born: January 25, 1788 Gaston, North Carolina, U.S.
- Died: December 18, 1873 (aged 85) Warren County, North Carolina, U.S.
- Party: Jacksonian (since 1825)
- Other political affiliations: Democratic-Republican (until 1825)
- Occupation: Politician

Weldon Nathaniel Edwards (January 25, 1788 – December 18, 1873) was a U.S. representative from North Carolina (1816 – 1827).

== Early life ==
Edwards was born in 1788 in Gaston, North Carolina. He has attended Warrenton Academy where he studied law and was admitted to the bar in 1810 commencing practice in Warrenton, North Carolina.

== Political career ==
=== North Carolina House ===
Edwards was member of the North Carolina House of Representatives in 1814 and 1815.

=== Congressional career ===
Edwards served from February 7, 1816, to March 3, 1827 in the United States House of Representatives. He was elected as a Republican to the Fourteenth Congress to fill the vacancy caused by the resignation of Nathaniel Macon, was reelected as a Republican to the Fifteenth, Sixteenth, and Seventeenth Congresses, elected as a Crawford Republican to the Eighteenth Congress, and as a Jacksonian to the Nineteenth Congress.

Edwards was chairman of the Committee on Expenditures in the Department of the Treasury (Eighteenth Congress), Committee on Public Expenditures (Nineteenth Congress). He declined to be a candidate for reelection in 1826 and chose to return to his plantation instead.

=== North Carolina Senate ===
He was a member of the North Carolina Senate between 1833–1844. In 1835 he was a member of the state constitutional convention. Edwards was reelected to the state senate in 1850 and chosen its speaker.

He was president of the State secession convention in 1861.

== Death ==
Edwards died in Warren County, North Carolina on December 18, 1873 and was interred in a private cemetery at his home, "Poplar Mount," about twelve miles from Warrenton in Warren County.

== See also ==
- Fourteenth United States Congress
- Fifteenth United States Congress
- Sixteenth United States Congress
- Seventeenth United States Congress
- Eighteenth United States Congress
- Nineteenth United States Congress

U.S. House of Representatives
Preceded by Nathaniel Macon	Member of the U.S. House of Representatives from North Carolina's 6th congressional district 1816–1827	Succeeded by Daniel Turner
