= Daniel Turner (North Carolina politician) =

American politician

Member of the U.S. House of Representatives from North Carolina's 6th district
- In office March 4, 1827 – March 3, 1829
- Preceded by: Weldon Nathaniel Edwards
- Succeeded by: Robert Potter

Member of the North Carolina House of Representatives
- In office 1819–1824

Personal details
- Born: September 26, 1796 Warrenton, North Carolina
- Died: July 21, 1860 (aged 63)
- Party: Jacksonian
- Spouse: Anna Arnold Key (m. 1829)
- Children: 11
- Parent: James Turner (father)
- Education: United States Military Academy
- Alma mater: College of William & Mary

Military service
- Branch/service: United States Army
- Years of service: 1812–1815
- Rank: Second lieutenant
- Battles/wars: War of 1812

Daniel Turner (September 26, 1796 – July 21, 1860) was a U.S. Congressman from North Carolina (1827 – 1829).

Turner was born in Warrenton, North Carolina as the son of future North Carolina Governor James Turner. He graduated from the United States Military Academy in 1814, and served in the War of 1812 as an assistant engineer with the rank of second lieutenant. As a result of the US Army's post-war reduction, he resigned in May 1815. Turner then studied at the College of William & Mary for two years before returning to North Carolina. He was a member of the North Carolina House of Commons (1819–1824). He was elected to the House of Representatives of the 20th Congress in 1827, serving one term.

On February 25, 1829, Turner married Anna Arnold Key, the daughter of Francis Scott Key. They had eleven children. From 1854 until his death, he was superintending engineer of public works at Mare Island Naval Shipyard.

His home, Reedy Rill, was listed on the National Register of Historic Places in 1974.

U.S. House of Representatives
Preceded by Weldon N. Edwards	Member of the U.S. House of Representatives from North Carolina's 6th congressional district 1827–1829	Succeeded by Robert Potter
