= Sallie Duke Drake Twitty =

American educator

- Born: Sallie Duke Drake; July 28, 1835; Oakville, Warren County, North Carolina, U.S.
- Died: July 26, 1923 (aged 87); Warrenton, North Carolina, U.S.
- Resting place: Fitts Place
- Education: Warrenton Female College; Patapsco Institute
- Occupations: schoolteacher, principal
- Spouse: John Eldridge Twitty (1862–1864; his death)

Sallie Duke Drake Twitty (July 28, 1835 – July 26, 1923) was an American schoolteacher and school administrator. She served as lady principal at Oxford Female Seminary in Oxford, North Carolina for forty-six years.

== Early life ==
Twitty was born on July 28, 1835, at Fitts Place, her maternal family's home in Warren County, North Carolina, to Matthew Mann Drake and Winnifred Fitts Drake. She was educated in private schools in Oakville and Warrenton before studying at the Warrenton Female College. After graduating from the college, she studied at the Patapsco Institute in Ellicott City, Maryland.

== Career and philanthropy ==
As a Civil War widow, Twitty was dedicated to supporting Confederate veterans. She was a leader in the organizing of the United Daughters of the Confederacy (UDC). She served as president of her local UDC chapter.

Following the war, Twitty was employed as a teacher at Warrenton Female College for the 1868–1869 school year. Following the college's closing in 1869, she co-founded Warren High School, a school for girls, with Mrs. Robert Jones that May. She and Jones served as co-principals of the school, which was locally referred to as Mrs. Jones's and Mrs. Twitty's School. The school closed in 1873, following the remarriage of Mrs. Jones, and Twitty found employment as a caregiver in the household of Elias Carr. Although the Carr family's plantation, Bracebridge Hall, was in Tarboro, they kept a summer house in Warrenton, where Twitty opened a school for boys, which operated from 1873 to 1880.

From 1880 to 1881, she was an English teacher at the Wilson Collegiate Institute and, from 1881 to 1885, she was in charge of the preparatory school department as lady principal. Following that, she worked at Oxford Female Seminary and the Luray Female Institute.

She retired from teaching on May 25, 1915, at which time a portrait of her was presented to Oxford Female Seminary by the senior class.

== Personal life and death ==
She married John Eldridge Twitty, a corporal in the Confederate States Army, on December 31, 1862. Her husband was later promoted to the rank of sergeant but was wounded during the Battle of Spotsylvania Court House on May 12, 1864, and died at Carver Hospital in Washington, D.C. Following her the death of her husband, Twitty remained in black mourning dress for the rest of her life.

Following her retirement in 1915, Twitty lived at the home of George R. Scoggin in Warrenton.

She was a supporter of the Democratic Party and a devout Methodist.

Twitty died on July 26, 1923, at the Scoggin home and was buried next to her husband in the Fitts family cemetery. A Methodist funeral was conducted by Rev. R. H. Broom from Roanoke Rapids, North Carolina.
