= St. Alban's Episcopal Church (Littleton, North Carolina) =

Historic church in North Carolina, United States

- U.S. National Register of Historic Places
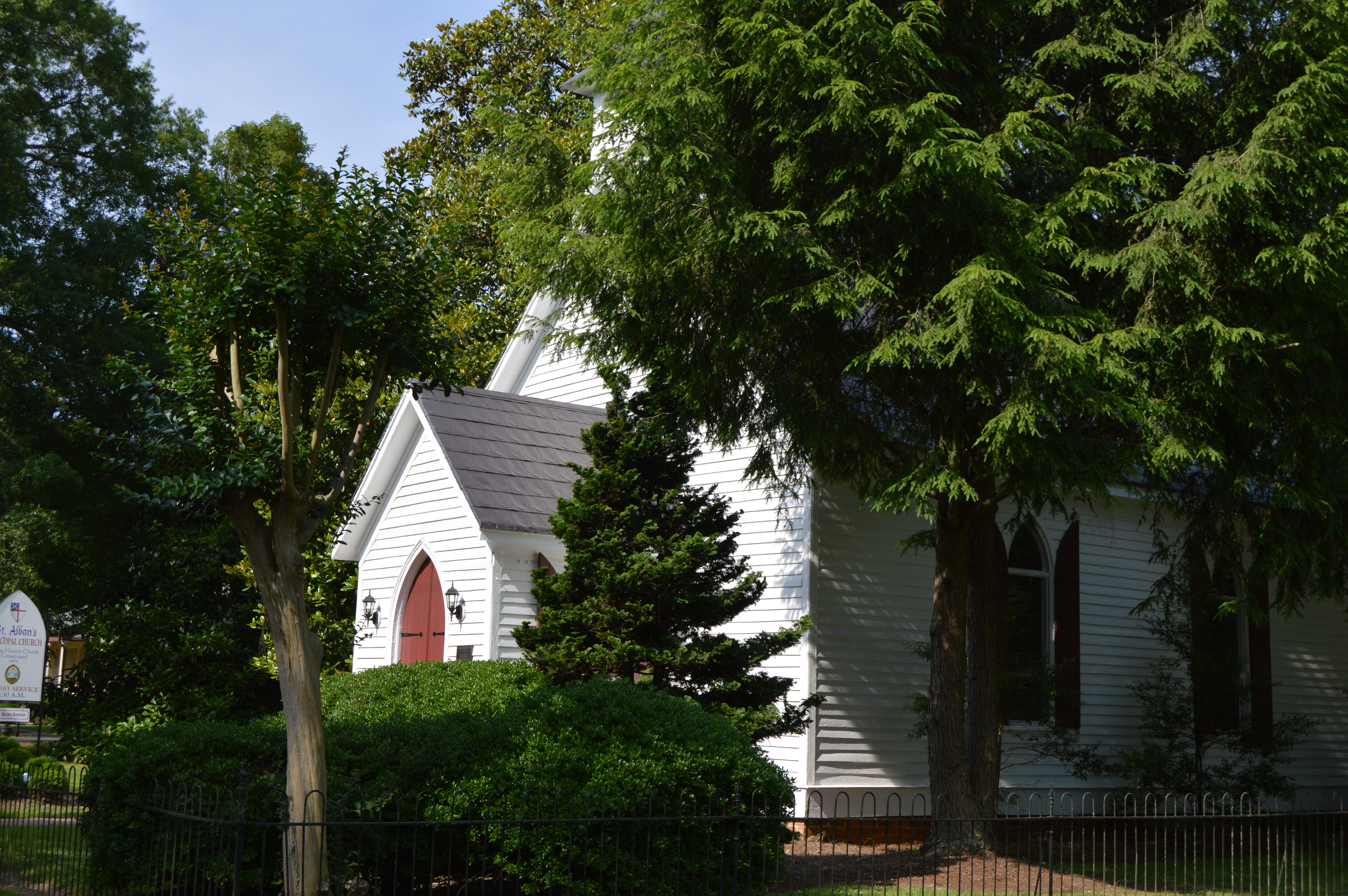
- Front and northern side

- Location within North Carolina Location within the United States
- Location: 300 Mosby Ave, Littleton, North Carolina
- Coordinates: 36°25′48″N 77°54′46″W
- Area: 0.4959 acres (0.2007 ha)
- Built: 1891
- Architectural style: Carpenter Gothic
- NRHP reference No.: 11000209
- Added to NRHP: April 20, 2011

St. Alban's Episcopal Church, also known as Chapel of the Cross, is a historic Episcopal church building located in Littleton, Halifax County, North Carolina.

== History ==
It was completed in 1891, and is a mostly vernacular building with the Carpenter Gothic features of lancet windows and doors. On April 20, 2011, the building was added to the National Register of Historic Places.

== Current status ==
St. Alban's Episcopal Church is an active parish in the Episcopal Diocese of North Carolina with regular Sunday services at 9:30 AM.
