= Cherry Hill Plantation =

Historic house in North Carolina, United States

- Cherry Hill
- U.S. National Register of Historic Places
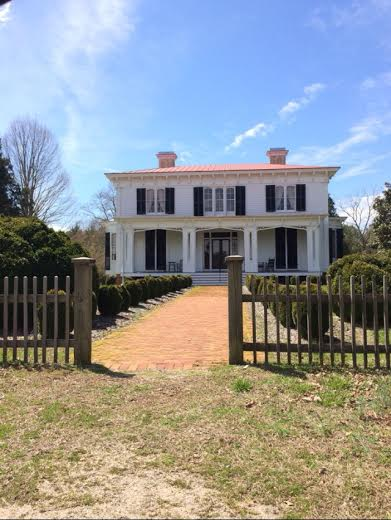

- Location within North Carolina Location within the United States
- Location: SE of Warrenton on NC 58, near Inez, Warren County, North Carolina
- Coordinates: 36°16′08″N 78°5′42″W
- Area: 20 acres (8.1 ha)
- Built: c. 1850
- Built by: Jacob W. Holt
- Architectural style: Greek Revival, Italianate
- NRHP reference No.: 74001384
- Added to NRHP: November 5, 1974

Inez, Warren County

Cherry Hill Plantation is a mid 19th-century plantation house located within the community of Inez, part of Warrenton in Warren County, North Carolina. The interior decoration was simple yet elegant, showcasing the Victorian taste for artificiality, and was built in the early 19th century by George Washington Alston and his wife, Marina Priscilla Williams.

Operated by the Cherry Hill Historical Foundation, the plantation now hosts concerts, performances, weddings, and other social functions. The house is located one hour away from the state capital, Raleigh.

== History ==
George Washington Alston (1801–1849) and his wife, Marine Williams Alston (1810–1897) lived at Old Cherry Hill, an early Alston home located several hundred yards behind the present house. Their three children, William, Philip, and George were all born at Old Cherry Hill and were still young boys at the time of their father's death. George and Marina had planned to build a new home, but these plans were interrupted by his death. After he became aware of his failing health, John Buxton Williams, whom he had made guardian of the three boys, proceeded with the building of the house.

Cherry Hill Plantation was built by John Waddell in 1858. Waddell was named the master builder of the plantation after Jacob Holt entrusted him with the responsibility of the task. When George Washington Alston died, he left the plantation to his wife. The Alston family also shared connections to several other large landowners. Marina Priscilla Williams commissioned the construction of the present building. The owners of this plantation were associated with other plantations in Warren County, Myrtle Lawn and Tusculum. They were also associated with the Linwood Farms, Rocky Hill, and Vine Hill Plantations in Franklin County.

During the time of the construction, there were ninety slaves on the estate with fourteen slave houses. The plantation consisted of 500 acres of improved land and 1500 acres unimproved, used for timber, grazing, etc.

== Architecture ==
There is a low fence around the house, and octagonal gazebos in the two corners of the front yard. There is an ice-house just north of the fence, and an octagonal well house with lattice walls just west of the back fence. Amethyst, the fine gem, can be found underneath the Cherry Hill home.

John A. Waddell used the skills he learned from the Holt school when he was building Cherry Hill. He incorporated Holt's blending of new and ornate Italianate and Gothic Revival styles with the traditional Greek Revival into the home design. A trefoil theme was used to model the porch, creating an ogee arch. The doors are painted to resemble various woods, such as rosewood and the baseboards are made to resemble gray or black marble. The interior decoration was simple but elegant, showcasing the Victorian taste for artificiality The piano for the composer or pianist to play was placed in the front hall, and the first thing visitors see upon entering the house. The front hall was designed using the axil plan: having one central hall and two equal-size rooms on both sides. The rooms were used for extra seating for concert listeners. There are two staircases within the house as well. The staircase on the northern side of the plantation was built for women who wore hooped dresses as well as serving as extra seating during concerts. The second staircase is located at the south side of the house and was used mostly by men. The guest composers would spend the night upstairs in the north bedroom the night before their concert. The south-end bedroom was used primarily for the children to stay in. The master bedroom, where Marina Alston slept, is located downstairs. A unique feature is the two closets built inside the room, as many homes during that time did not have a closet inside of the rooms.

The building was structured to highlight the supreme southern hospitality.

== Concert theater ==
Concerts were not played at Cherry Hill until Edgar Thorne came along. Edgar Thorne began buying out the other owners of the property in the 1960s. He deeded the house and 14 acres of the property to the Cherry Hill Historical Foundation in 1982 and continued to live there with his sister until her death in 1998, establishing the Cherry Hill Concert Series and caring for the house. The plantation soon became well known for its outstanding concerts. Three concerts were held in the fall and three in the spring due to the lack of central heating and air conditioning. Guests could sit in the same room as the composer, or in either of the two rooms that were close to the composer. Many of them also sat on the first stairwell of the house, and if there were several guests, they sat on the opposite stairwell. The composers consisted of pianists and violinists. The grand piano that now sits in the front of the house was put there in 2001, replacing the Steinway Grand that was previously there. Edgar Thorne died in 2004. It was his dream that the Cherry Hill Historical Foundation continue the classical concert series that he and his sister began in the 1970s.

Today, Cherry Hill holds concerts throughout the year except during the summer unless it is a special occasion. Each concert averages between 35 and 60 guests during each concert. The concepts and design that Edgar Thorne had are still the same, keeping everything as original as possible.
