= Marvin Townes =

American football player (born 1980)

Profile
- Position: Running back

Personal information
- Born: November 9, 1980 (age 45); Warrenton, North Carolina
- Listed height: 6 ft 0 in (1.83 m)
- Listed weight: 194 lb (88 kg)

Career information
- College: East Carolina
- NFL draft: 2005: undrafted

Career history
- Winnipeg Blue Bombers (2006); Carolina Speed (2007)*; Team Alabama (2008)*
- * Offseason or practice squad member only

Marvin Townes (born November 9, 1980) is an American former football running back.

== College ==
An honor roll student at East Carolina University, Townes earned All-Conference USA honors as a kick returner and posted the 12th 1,000 yard season in school history. As a junior in 2003, finished with 1,128 rushing yards, scored 8 touchdowns, and caught 23 passes for 176 yards. His senior season was a disappointment after rehabbing from injury during the off-season; despite being only one of three schools in the nation to return two 1,000 yard rushers (Townes with Art Brown), new offensive coordinator Noah Brindise installed a Fun-N-Gun offense, and Townes managed only 234 yards on 87 carries with 1 touchdown and 7 receptions for 23 yards.

He ended his career with a total of 1,832 rushing yards on 447 carries and 12 touchdowns.

== Professional ==
Amid speculation Townes might switch to wide receiver in the professional ranks, he went undrafted in the 2005 NFL draft and received limited attention, ultimately getting a tryout with the New York Jets and not much else. An injury forced his release from the Canadian Football League’s Winnipeg Blue Bombers shortly after, and Townes turned to the Carolina Speed of the American Indoor Football Association in 2007 but did not play.

Townes was selected in the 44th round, 259th overall, by Team Alabama in the 2008 All American Football League draft.
