= Hull-Hawkins House =

Historic house in Florida, United States

- U.S. National Register of Historic Places
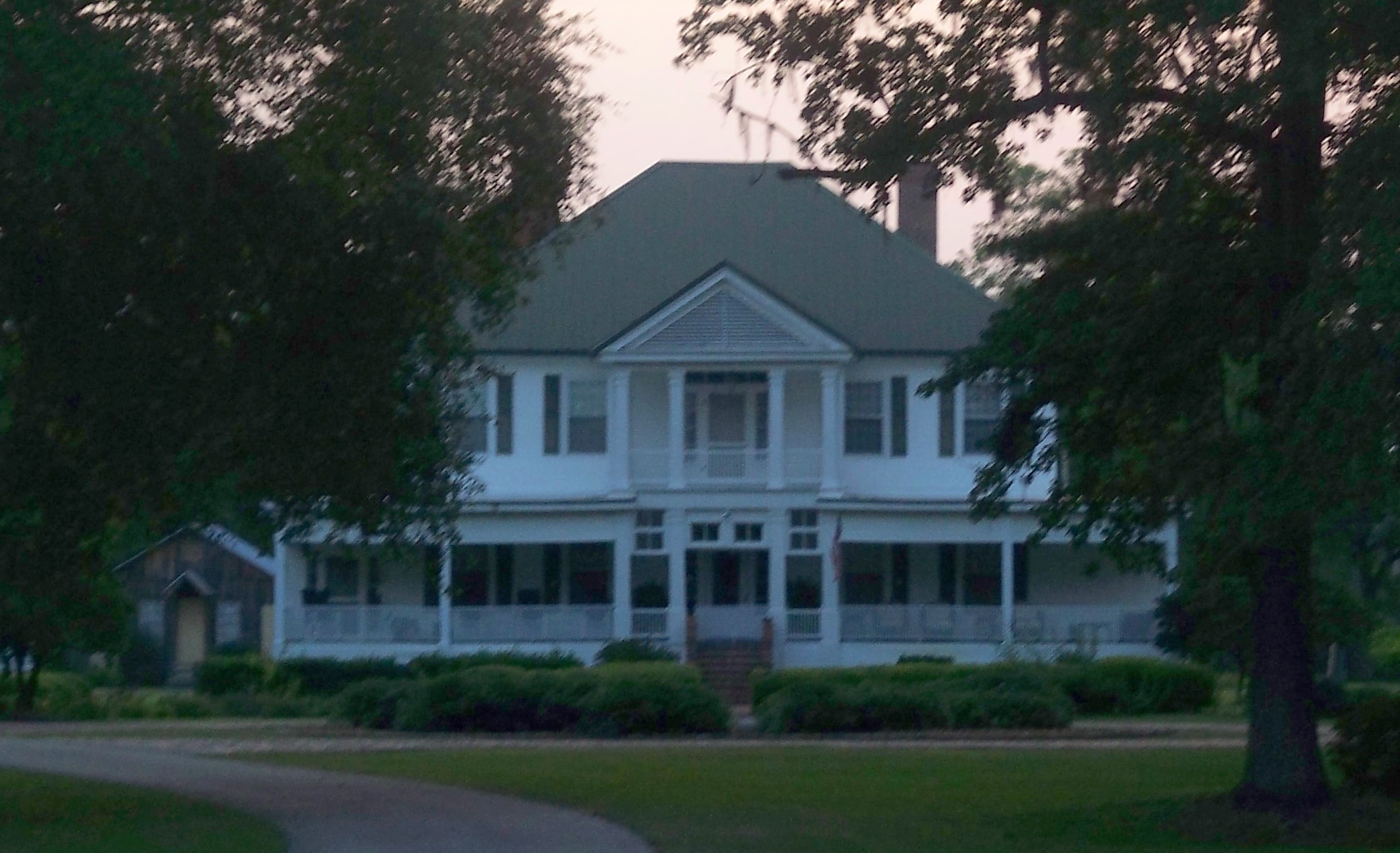

- Location within Florida Location within the United States
- Location: Suwannee County, Florida
- Nearest city: Live Oak
- Coordinates: 30°12′53″N 82°55′9″W
- Area: less than one acre
- Built: c. 1866
- Architectural style: Greek Revival
- NRHP reference No.: 73000604
- Added to NRHP: May 7, 1973

The Hull-Hawkins House (also known as the Hawkins House) is a historic house near Live Oak, Florida. It is located at 10 miles south of Live Oak on Former State Road 49. The actual location is closer to McAlpin. On May 7, 1973, it was added to the U.S. National Register of Historic Places.
