= Abraham Watson House =

Historic house in Massachusetts, United States

- U.S. National Register of Historic Places
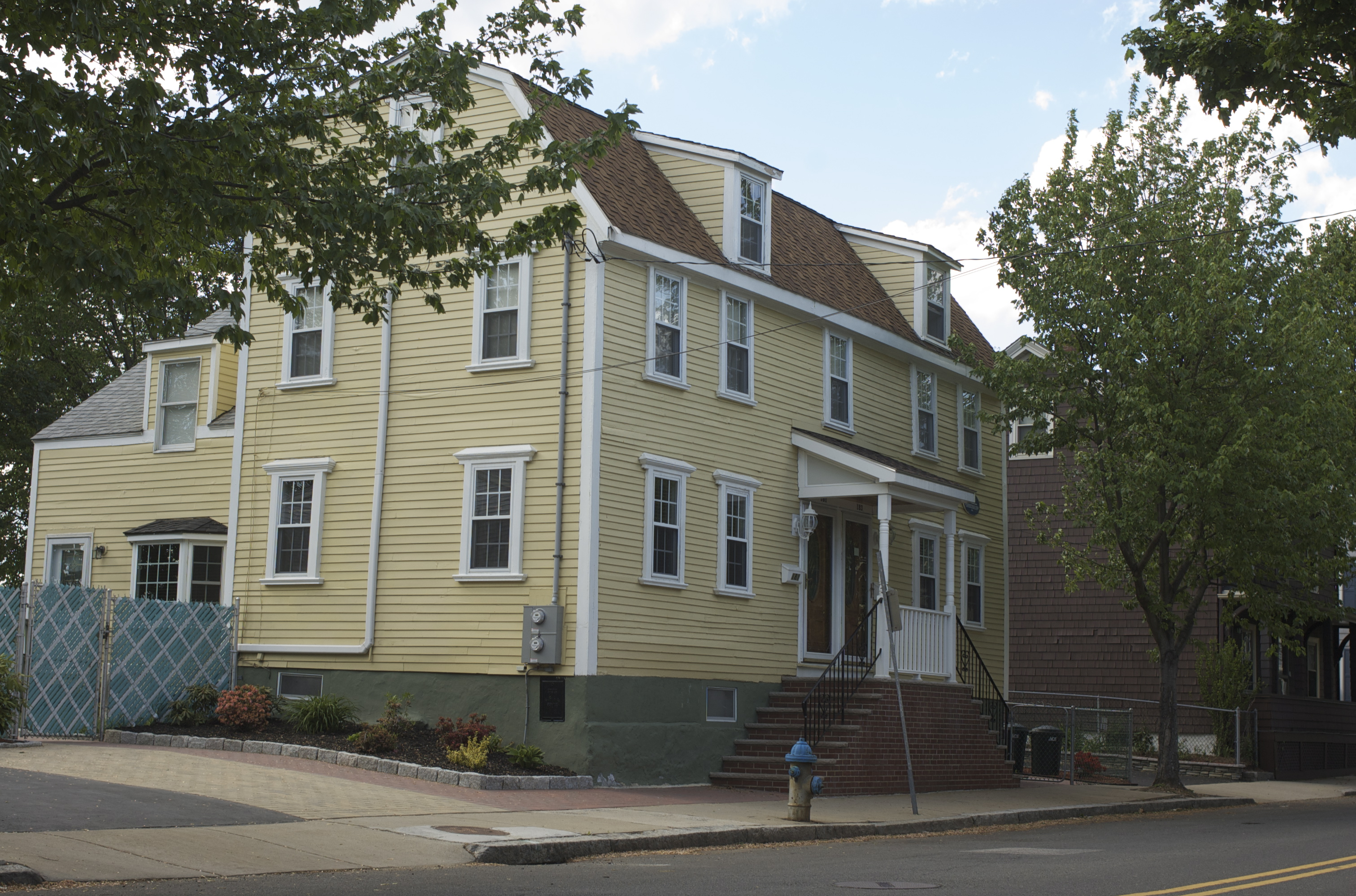

- Location within Massachusetts
- Location: 181-183 Sherman Street, Cambridge, Massachusetts
- Coordinates: 42°23′32.9″N 71°07′58.6″W
- Built: 1750
- Architectural style: Georgian
- MPS: Cambridge MRA
- NRHP reference No.: 82001984
- Added to NRHP: April 13, 1982

The Abraham Watson House is a historic house in Cambridge, Massachusetts.

== Description ==
It is a 2 1/2-story wood-frame structure, five bays wide, with a gable roof that has a gambrel front. It was built c. 1750 by Abraham Watson, Jr., who was politically active during the American Revolution. The house's features, including molded surrounds on the windows, indicate that Watson was a man of substance. The house is one of only two colonial houses standing in North Cambridge, and is the oldest house in the city outside Old Cambridge.

The house was listed on the National Register of Historic Places on April 13, 1982.

== See also ==
- National Register of Historic Places listings in Cambridge, Massachusetts
