= William Henry Watson Homestead =

Historic house in Arkansas, United States

- U.S. National Register of Historic Places
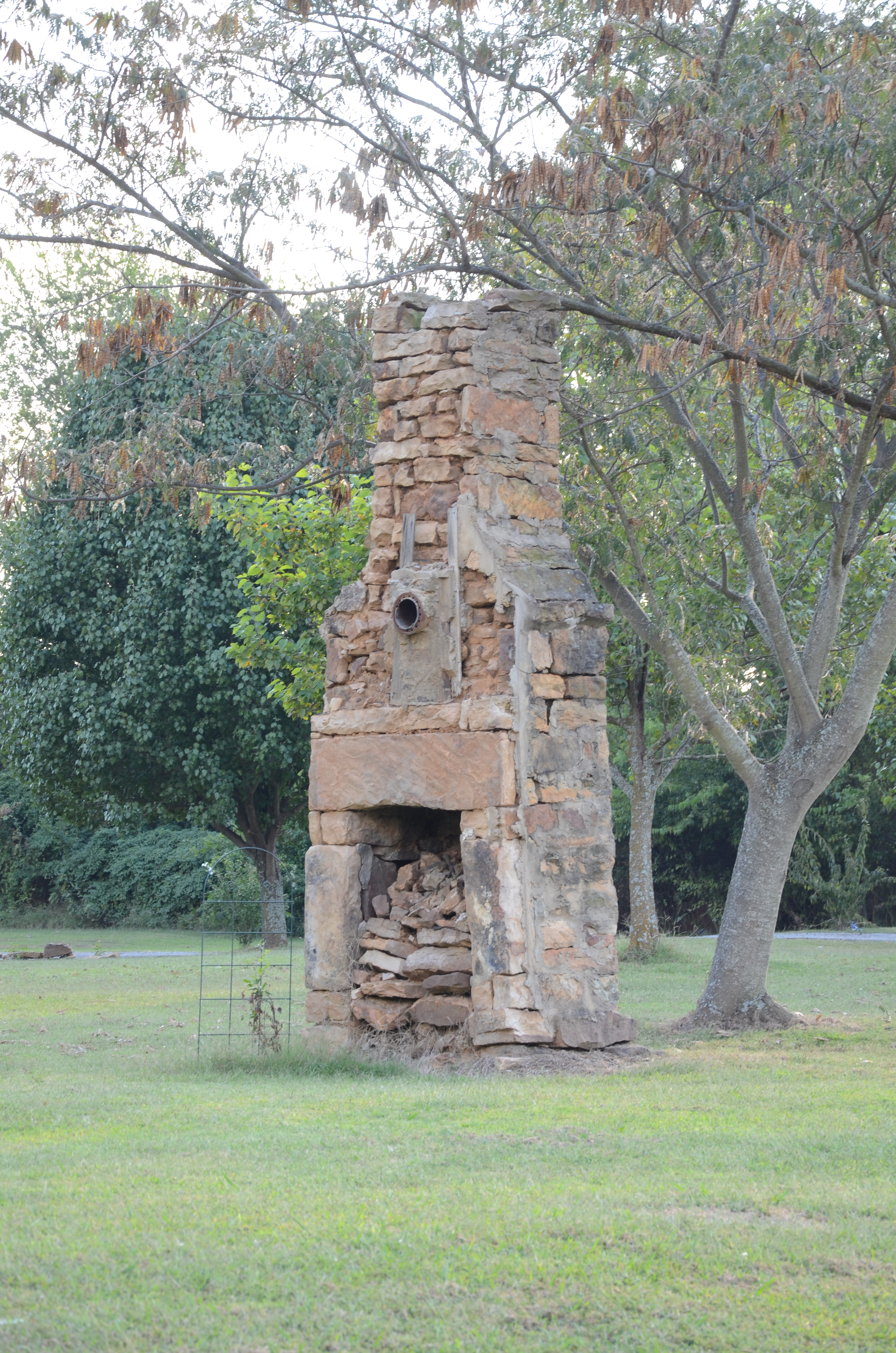
- All that remained in 2015

- Location within Arkansas Location within the United States
- Nearest city: Denmark, Arkansas
- Coordinates: 35°26′32″N 91°35′23″W
- Area: less than one acre
- Architect: William Henry Watson
- Architectural style: Vernacular dog-trot
- MPS: White County MPS
- NRHP reference No.: 91001308
- Added to NRHP: July 20, 1992

The William Henry Watson Homestead was a historic house on White County Route 68 in Denmark, Arkansas. It was a single story wood frame dogtrot house, with a side gable roof, weatherboard siding, and a foundation of stone piers. Originally built with a single pen about 1890, it was extended at some period.

The house was listed on the National Register of Historic Places in 1992. It has been listed as destroyed in the Arkansas Historic Preservation Program database.

== See also ==
- National Register of Historic Places listings in White County, Arkansas
