= Shady Oaks =

Historic house in North Carolina, United States

- U.S. National Register of Historic Places
- Location within North Carolina Location within the United States
- Location: SE of Warrenton on SR 1600, near Warrenton, North Carolina
- Coordinates: 36°22′49″N 78°8′32″W
- Area: 7 acres (2.8 ha)
- Built: c. 1815
- Architectural style: Federal
- NRHP reference No.: 76001346
- Added to NRHP: March 15, 1976

Shady Oaks, also known as the Cheek-Twitty House, is a historic plantation house located near Warrenton, Warren County, North Carolina.

== Overview ==
It was built about 1815, and is a tripartite Federal style frame dwelling. It consists of a rather narrow two-story central block, flanked by perpendicular two-bay wings, with one-story frame additions. It is sheathed in weatherboard, has a gable roof, and one-story shed porch.

It was listed on the National Register of Historic Places in 1976.
