= Warren County Fire Tower =

- U.S. National Register of Historic Places
- Location within North Carolina Location within the United States
- Location: 4.5 miles S of Warrenton on NC 58 S, near Liberia, North Carolina
- Coordinates: 36°21′39″N 78°4′52″W
- Area: 0.1 acres (0.040 ha)
- Built: 1932
- Built by: Aermotor Windmill Company
- Architectural style: Lookout tower
- NRHP reference No.: 00000164
- Added to NRHP: March 3, 2000

Warren County Fire Tower is a historic fire tower located near Liberia, Warren County, North Carolina. It was built in 1932, by the Aermotor Company of Chicago, Illinois.

== Background ==
The Aermotor tower is a four sided truss steel frame with bolted connections that stands 100 feet tall. It is the only fire tower in Warren County and was operated until 1993.

It was listed on the National Register of Historic Places in 2000.
