= Mansfield Thornton House =

Historic house in North Carolina, United States

- U.S. National Register of Historic Places
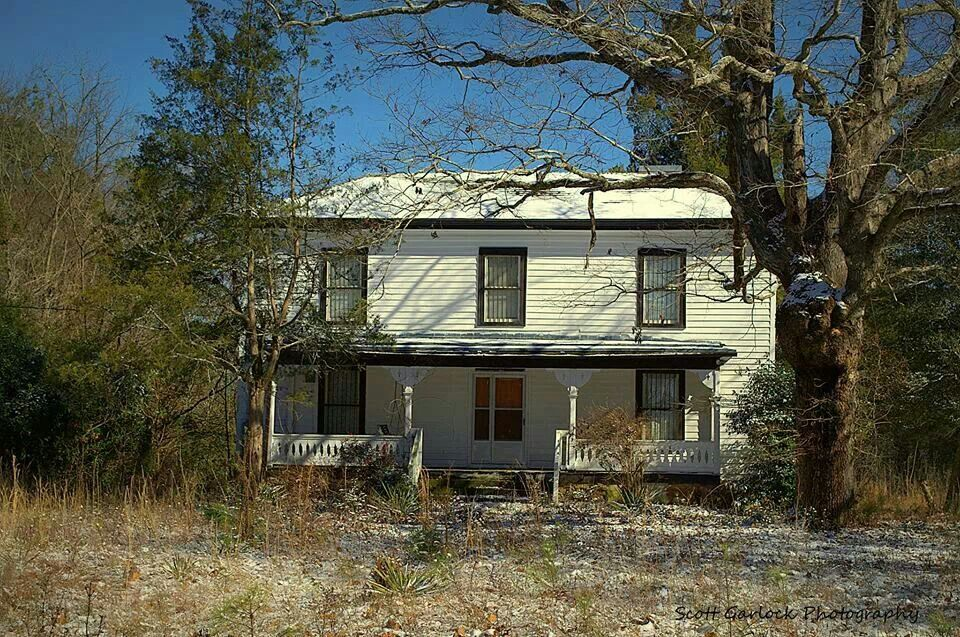

- Location within North Carolina Location within the United States
- Location: SE of Warrenton, near Warrenton, North Carolina
- Coordinates: 36°23′12″N 78°8′46″W
- Area: 2 acres (0.81 ha)
- Built: c. 1885
- Architectural style: post-Greek revival
- NRHP reference No.: 77001014
- Added to NRHP: December 2, 1977

Mansfield Thornton House is a historic home located near Warrenton, Warren County, North Carolina. It was built about 1885, and is a two-story, three bay by one bay, post-Greek Revival style frame dwelling. It is sheathed in weatherboard, sits on a rubble foundation, has a hipped roof, and one-story hip roofed front porch. It was built for former slave Mansfield Thornton.

It was listed on the National Register of Historic Places in 1977.
