= Chapel of the Good Shepherd (Ridgeway, North Carolina) =

Historic church in North Carolina, United States

- U.S. National Register of Historic Places
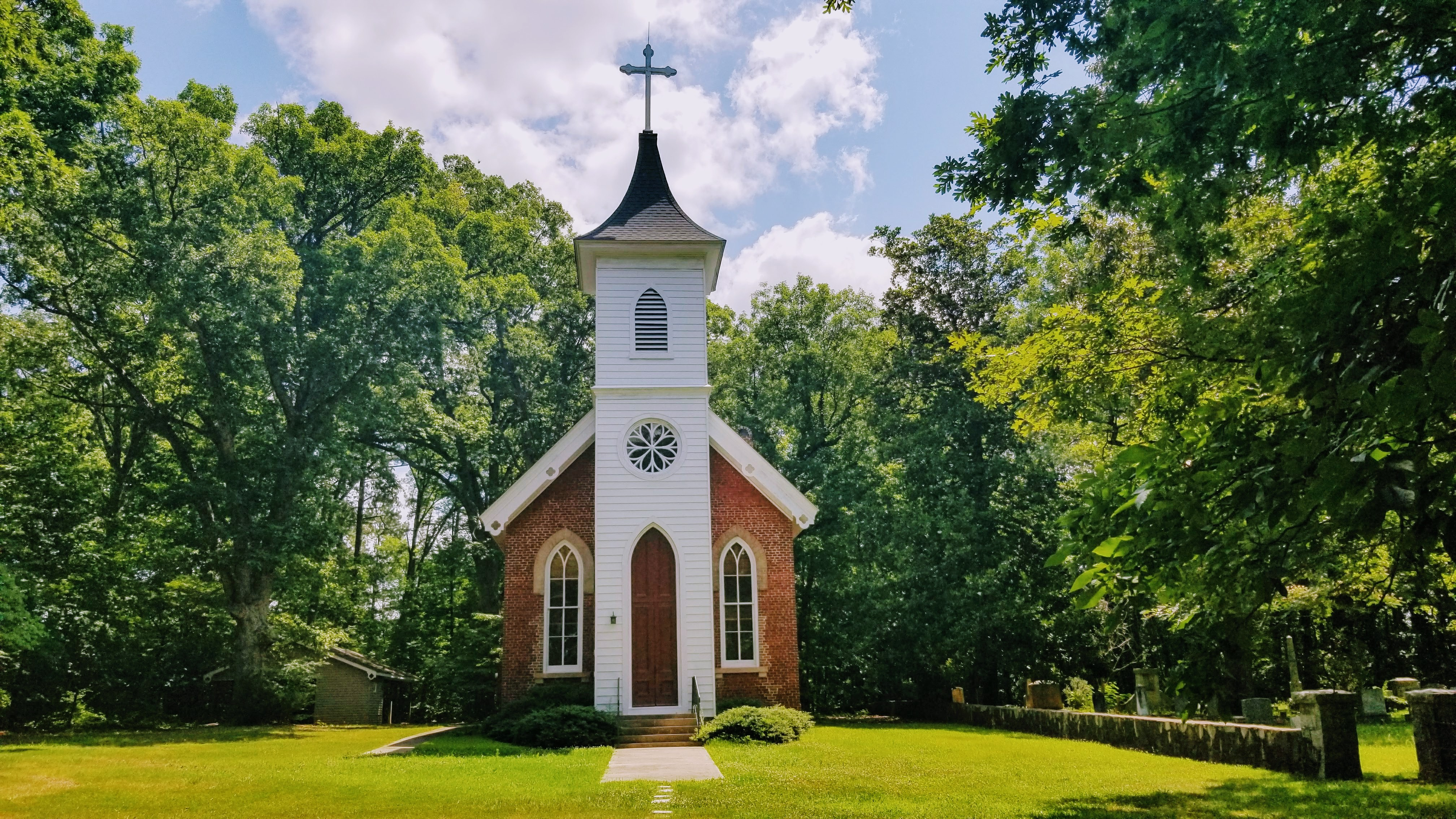
- Facade

- Location within North Carolina Location within the United States
- Location: East of Ridgeway, North Carolina
- Coordinates: 36°26′10″N 78°13′22″W
- Area: 4.5 acres (1.8 ha)
- Built: 1871
- Architectural style: Gothic Revival
- NRHP reference No.: 77001013
- Added to NRHP: September 16, 1977

Chapel of the Good Shepherd is a historic Episcopal chapel located near Ridgeway, Warren County, North Carolina. It was built in 1871, and is a one-story, three bay by three bay, Gothic Revival-style brick chapel. It features a three-stage red-painted wooden entrance tower with a concave pyramidal roof.

It was added to the National Register of Historic Places in 1977.

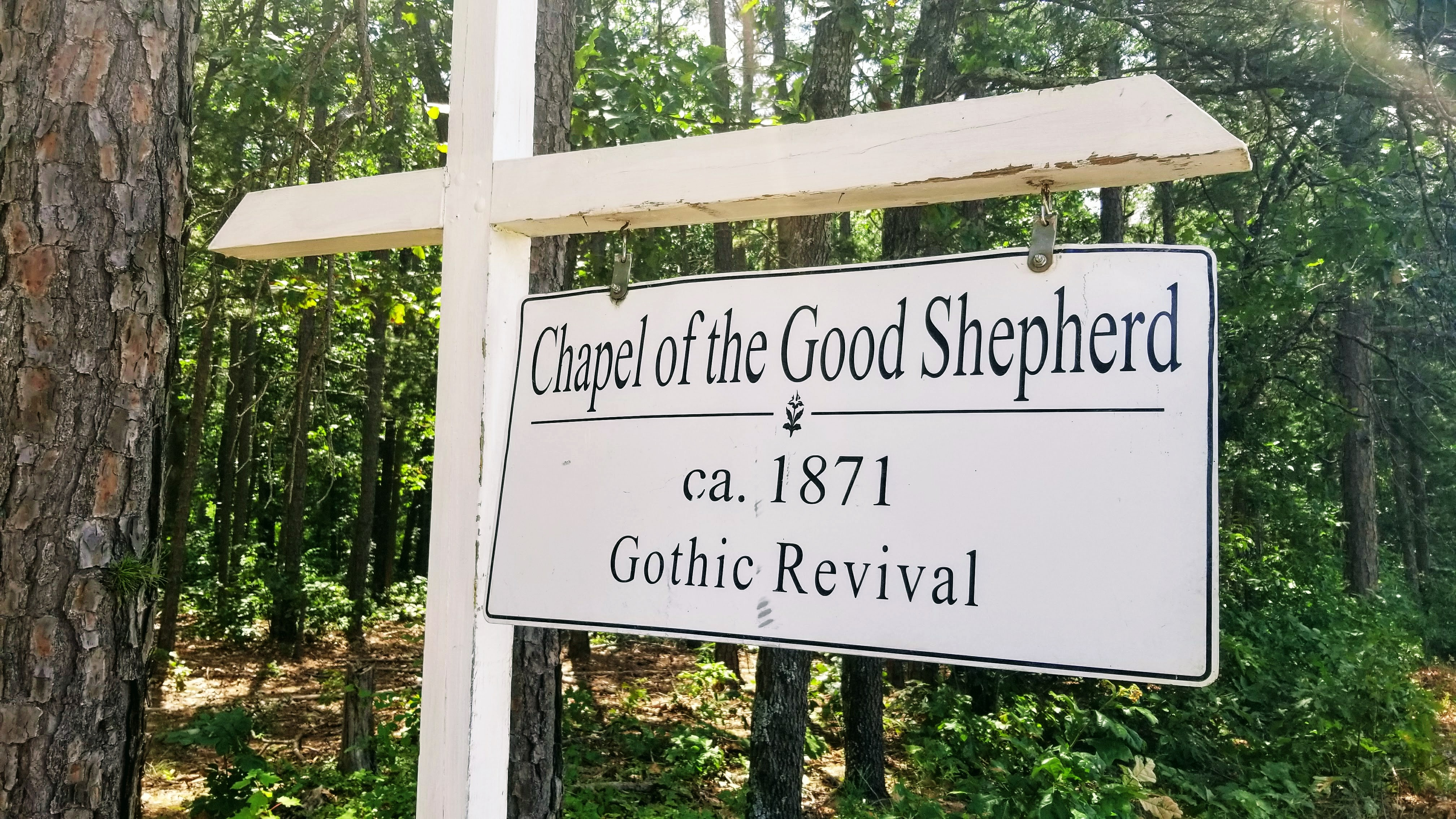
Road sign for the chapel
