= Buxton Place =

Historic house in North Carolina, United States

- U.S. National Register of Historic Places
- U.S. Historic district
- Location within North Carolina Location within the United States
- Location: NC 58 W side, 0.2 miles N of jct. with NC 1628, near Inez, North Carolina
- Coordinates: 36°14′30″N 78°6′22″W
- Area: 795.1 acres (321.8 ha)
- Built: c. 1857
- Built by: John A. Waddell, Jacob W. Holt
- Architectural style: Greek Revival, Italianate
- NRHP reference No.: 93000323
- Added to NRHP: April 22, 1993

Buxton Place is a historic plantation / farm complex and national historic district located near Inez, Warren County, North Carolina. The main house was built by John A. Waddell, an associate of Jacob W. Holt, starting about 1857. It is a two-story, double-pile, Greek Revival / Italianate style frame dwelling. It has a low hipped roof and nearly full-width front porch. Other contributing resources are the mid-19th-century smokehouse, water tower (1918), barn (c. 1942), carriage house (c. 1930), chicken house (c. 1940), service station/store (c. 1930), a slave house or kitchen (mid-19th century), cotton gin (c. 1930), packhouse (c. 1940), workshop (c, 1930), family cemetery, and the agricultural landscape.

It was listed on the National Register of Historic Places in 1993.
