= Ridgeway, North Carolina =

- Unincorporated community
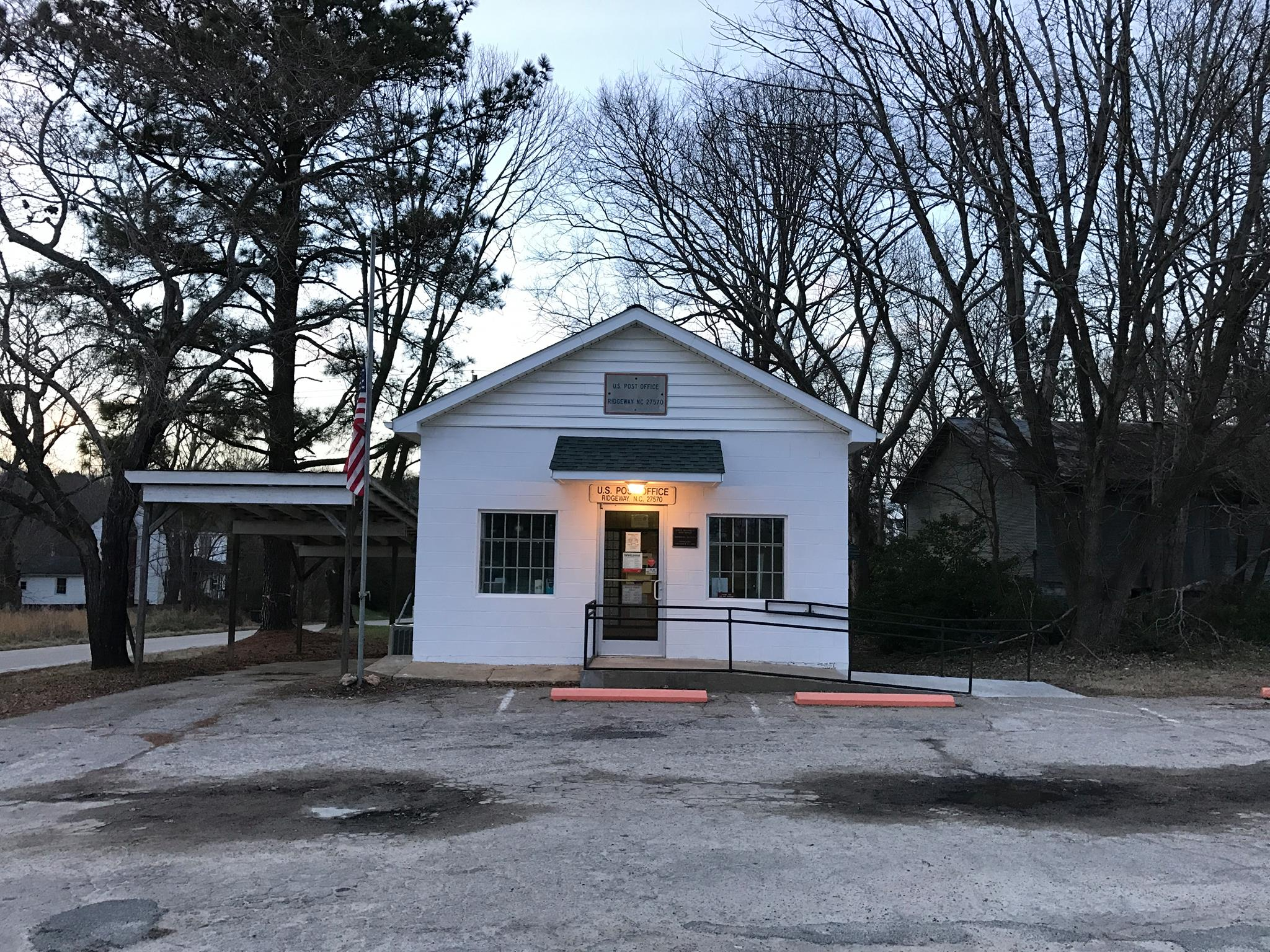
- Post office in Ridgeway

- Location within North Carolina Location within the United States
- Coordinates: 36°26′09″N 78°14′12″W
- Country: United States
- State: North Carolina
- County: Warren
- Elevation: 420 ft (130 m)
- Time zone: UTC-5 (Eastern (EST))
  - Summer (DST): UTC-4 (EDT)
- ZIP code: 27570
- Area code: 252
- GNIS feature ID: 1022289

Ridgeway is an unincorporated community in Warren County, North Carolina, United States. The community is located on U.S. Route 1, 2.25 miles (3.62 km) west-southwest of Norlina. Ridgeway has a post office with ZIP code 27570.

The Chapel of the Good Shepherd and William J. Hawkins House are listed on the National Register of Historic Places.

== History ==
Ridgeway formed as a community in the early 1800s. The community became home to a railway station and post office following the creation of the Raleigh and Gaston Railroad.
