= Buck Spring Plantation =

Historic house in North Carolina, United States

- U.S. National Register of Historic Places
- Location within North Carolina Location within the United States
- Location: N of Vaughan on SR 1348, near Vaughan, North Carolina
- Coordinates: 36°28′50″N 77°59′52″W
- Area: 70 acres (28 ha)
- Built: 1781
- NRHP reference No.: 70000480
- Added to NRHP: October 15, 1970

Buck Spring Plantation, also known as the Nathaniel Macon House, is a historic plantation house site located near Vaughan, Warren County, North Carolina. The property includes the graves of politician Nathaniel Macon (1757–1837) and his wife Hannah Plummer Mason, log corn crib, smokehouse, caretaker's house, and reconstructed dwelling house dated to the 1930s.

It was listed on the National Register of Historic Places in 1970.
