= Lake O'Woods =

Historic house in North Carolina, United States

- U.S. National Register of Historic Places
- Location within North Carolina Location within the United States
- Location: S of Inez of SR 1512, near Inez, North Carolina
- Coordinates: 36°18′11″N 78°5′10″W
- Area: 75 acres (30 ha)
- Built: 1829, 1852
- Built by: Gamaliel Albert Jones
- Architectural style: Greek Revival
- NRHP reference No.: 79001760
- Added to NRHP: January 19, 1979

Lake O'Woods, also known as the Edward and Rebecca Pitchford Davis House, is a historic plantation house located near Inez, Warren County, North Carolina. The main house was built by Albert Gamaliel Jones in 1852. It is a two-story, three bay by two bay, Greek Revival style frame dwelling. It has a shallow, overhanging hipped roof and entrance porch with fluted columns. Also on the property are the contributing earlier house or kitchen (c. 1790); four hole outhouse; a log chicken house; an early smokehouse and a later one of logs; a mounted farm bell; a well; and a collection of barns and stable.

It was listed on the National Register of Historic Places in 1979.
