= Solomon and Kate Williams Jr. House =

Historic house in North Carolina, United States

- U.S. National Register of Historic Places
- Location within North Carolina Location within the United States
- Location: Jct. of NC 58 and NC 1626, near Inez, North Carolina
- Coordinates: 36°16′28″N 78°5′41″W
- Area: 3.6 acres (1.5 ha)
- Built: c. 1880
- Architectural style: Hip-roof square plan house
- NRHP reference No.: 03000968
- Added to NRHP: September 25, 2003

Solomon and Kate Williams Jr. House, also known as The Anchorage, is a historic home located near Inez, Warren County, North Carolina. It was built about 1880, and is a one-story, frame building with a low-pitched hip roof and an almost square plan. A one-story rear addition was built in 2000–2001. It features a hip roofed front porch with sawnwork decoration. Also on the property is a contributing smokehouse (c. 1880).

It was listed on the National Register of Historic Places in 2003.
