= Vaughan, North Carolina =

Vaughan
- Unincorporated community
- Location within North Carolina Location within the United States
- Coordinates: 36°25′36″N 78°00′13″W
- Country: United States
- State: North Carolina
- County: Warren
- Elevation: 344 ft (105 m)
- Time zone: UTC-5 (Eastern (EST))
  - Summer (DST): UTC-4 (EDT)
- ZIP code: 27586
- Area code: 252
- GNIS feature ID: 996597

Vaughan is an unincorporated community in Warren County, North Carolina, United States. The community is located on U.S. Route 158, 4.5 miles (7.2 km) east of Macon. Vaughan had its own post office until October 22, 2011; it still has its own ZIP code, 27586.

The Mary Ann Browne House and Buck Spring Plantation are listed on the National Register of Historic Places.
