= Leport–Toupin House =

Historic house in Nevada, United States

- U.S. National Register of Historic Places
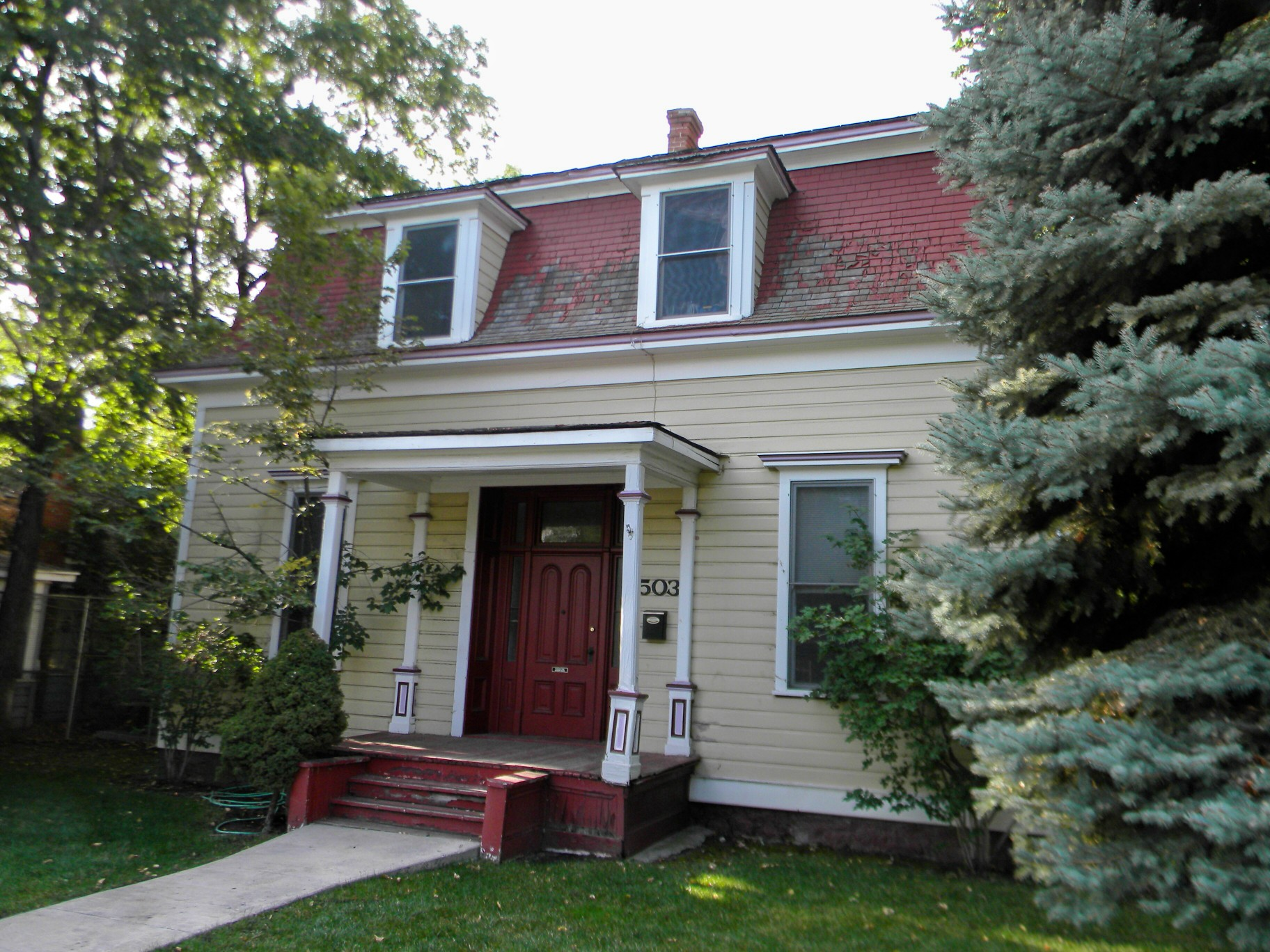

- Location within Nevada Location within the United States
- Location: 503 E. Telegraph St., Carson City, Nevada
- Coordinates: 39°9′57″N 119°45′42″W
- Area: less than one acre
- Built: 1879
- Built by: Leport, Alexander
- Architectural style: Second Empire
- NRHP reference No.: 85002407
- Added to NRHP: September 16, 1985

The Leport–Toupin House, at 503 E. Telegraph St. in Carson City, Nevada, is a historic simplified-Second Empire-style house that was built in 1879. It was converted to a pre-school in 1969. Also known as the Hawkins House, it was listed on the National Register of Historic Places in 1985.

It was deemed significant for its architecture and also for its association with Alexander Leport (1837–1885), a French-born businessman who came to Carson City in 1879 and developed grocery, saloon, drugstore, barber shop and other businesses. He arranged for the house to be built in anticipation of his 1880 marriage to Frenchwoman Mary Blavee. In 1891, six years after Leport's death, Mary Leport married Edmond S. Toupin, a French-Canadian who took over Leport's businesses. In 1907 ownership of the house passed to Theodore Perry Hawkins and his wife, Clara.

The house is one of few Second Empire houses in Carson City, and the only one in its east side residential area.
