= Elgin (Warrenton, North Carolina) =

Historic house in North Carolina, United States

- U.S. National Register of Historic Places
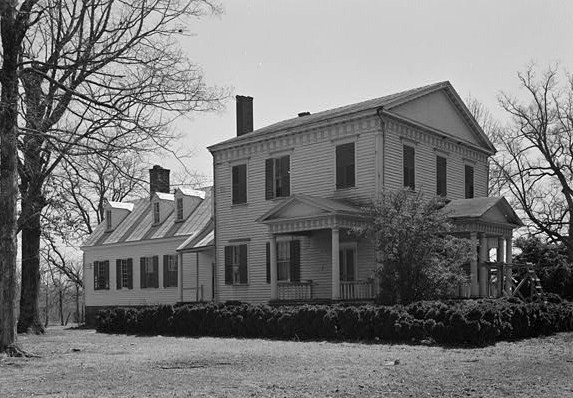
- Elgin, HABS Photo, 1940

- Location within North Carolina Location within the United States
- Location: SE of Warrenton on SR 1509, near Warrenton, North Carolina
- Coordinates: 36°23′06″N 78°06′09″W
- Area: 60 acres (24 ha)
- Built: c. 1830
- Architectural style: Federal, temple form dwelling
- NRHP reference No.: 73001381
- Added to NRHP: February 6, 1973

Elgin is a historic plantation house located near Warrenton, Warren County, North Carolina. It was built about 1835, and is a two-story, three-bay, Federal-style temple-form frame dwelling. It has a gable roof, pedimented front porch, and flanking porches. At the rear is an earlier 1 1/2-story frame dwelling with a gable roof. The front facade features a Palladian entrance with sidelights and Tuscan colonnettes. The house is similar in style to Dalkeith.

It was listed on the National Register of Historic Places in 1973.
