= Reedy Rill =

Historic house in North Carolina, United States

- U.S. National Register of Historic Places
- Location within North Carolina Location within the United States
- Location: S of Warrenton off SR 1600, near Warrenton, North Carolina
- Coordinates: 36°20′47″N 78°9′29″W
- Area: 9 acres (3.6 ha)
- Built: c. 1830-1846, c. 1855
- Architectural style: Italianate
- NRHP reference No.: 74001385
- Added to NRHP: December 3, 1974

Reedy Rill is a historic plantation house located near Warrenton, Warren County, North Carolina. The main house was built between 1830 and 1846, and remodeled about 1855 and credited to Warrenton builder Jacob W. Holt. It is a two-story, square, Italianate style frame dwelling. It features simple pilasters terminating in heavy brackets and round arched windows. It has a front porch, stuccoed foundation, and rear shed addition. Reedy Rill was built for Congressman Daniel Turner.

It was listed on the National Register of Historic Places in 1974.
