= Sledge-Hayley House =

Historic house in North Carolina, United States

- U.S. National Register of Historic Places
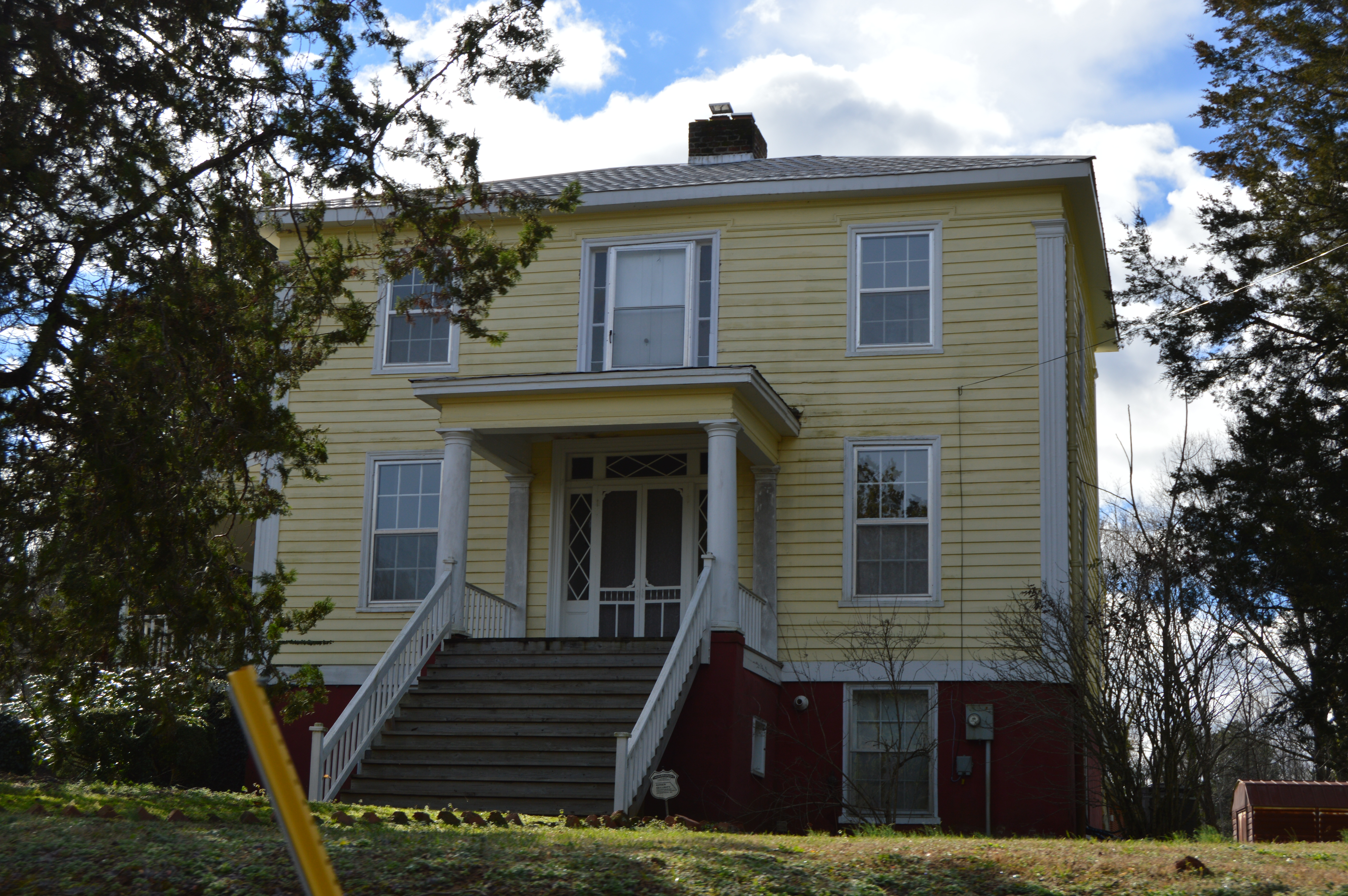
- Facade

- Location within North Carolina Location within the United States
- Location: Frankin and Hayley Sts., Warrenton, North Carolina
- Coordinates: 36°23′51″N 78°9′37″W
- Area: less than one acre
- Built: 1852-1855
- Architectural style: Greek Revival
- NRHP reference No.: 80002904
- Added to NRHP: April 17, 1980

Sledge-Hayley House is a historic home located at Warrenton, Warren County, North Carolina. It was built between 1852 and 1855, and is a two-story, three-bay, Greek Revival style rectangular frame dwelling. It has a hipped roof with deep overhang and sits on a brick basement. The front facade has a one-bay entrance porch supported by two unfluted Doric order columns.

It was listed on the National Register of Historic Places in 1980.
