= Little Manor =

Historic house in North Carolina, United States

- U.S. National Register of Historic Places
- Location within North Carolina Location within the United States
- Location: Belle Shearin Rd., south of Littleton, near Littleton, North Carolina
- Coordinates: 36°25′09″N 77°54′54″W
- Area: 7 acres (2.8 ha)
- Built: 1804
- Architectural style: Federal
- NRHP reference No.: 73001378
- Added to NRHP: April 24, 1973

Little Manor, also known as Mosby Hall, is a historic plantation house located in Warren County, North Carolina near the town of Littleton. It was built about 1804, and is a Federal style frame dwelling consisting of a two-story, five-bay, pedimented main block flanked by one-story wings. It has a pedimented center bay front porch with Doric order pilasters and an older two-story rear wing, dated to about 1780.

It was listed on the National Register of Historic Places in 1973.

== See also ==
- Dr. Charles and Susan Skinner House and Outbuildings, AKA Linden Hall, another plantation house near the town of Littleton
