= Mary Ann Browne House =

Historic house in North Carolina, United States

- U.S. National Register of Historic Places
- Location within North Carolina Location within the United States
- Location: NC 1530, near Vaughan, North Carolina
- Coordinates: 36°24′51″N 77°59′13″W
- Area: 2.4 acres (0.97 ha)
- Built: c. 1800, c. 1855
- Built by: John Faulcon, Jacob W. Holt
- Architectural style: Gothic, Italianate, Federal
- NRHP reference No.: 86001912
- Added to NRHP: July 24, 1986

Mary Ann Browne House, also known as Oakley, Oakley Grove, Faulcon-Browne House, and Dr. LaFayette Browne House, is a historic plantation house located near Vaughan, Warren County, North Carolina. It consists of a 2 1/2-story, Italianate style rear wing built about 1800, with a main block added about 1855. The main block is attributed to Warrenton builder Jacob W. Holt. It is a two-story, three-bay, single pile, Greek Revival / Italianate style frame block. It has a low hipped roof and Tudor arched windows.

It was listed on the National Register of Historic Places in 1986.
