= Warrenton Historic District (Warrenton, North Carolina) =

Historic district in North Carolina, United States

- U.S. National Register of Historic Places
- U.S. Historic district
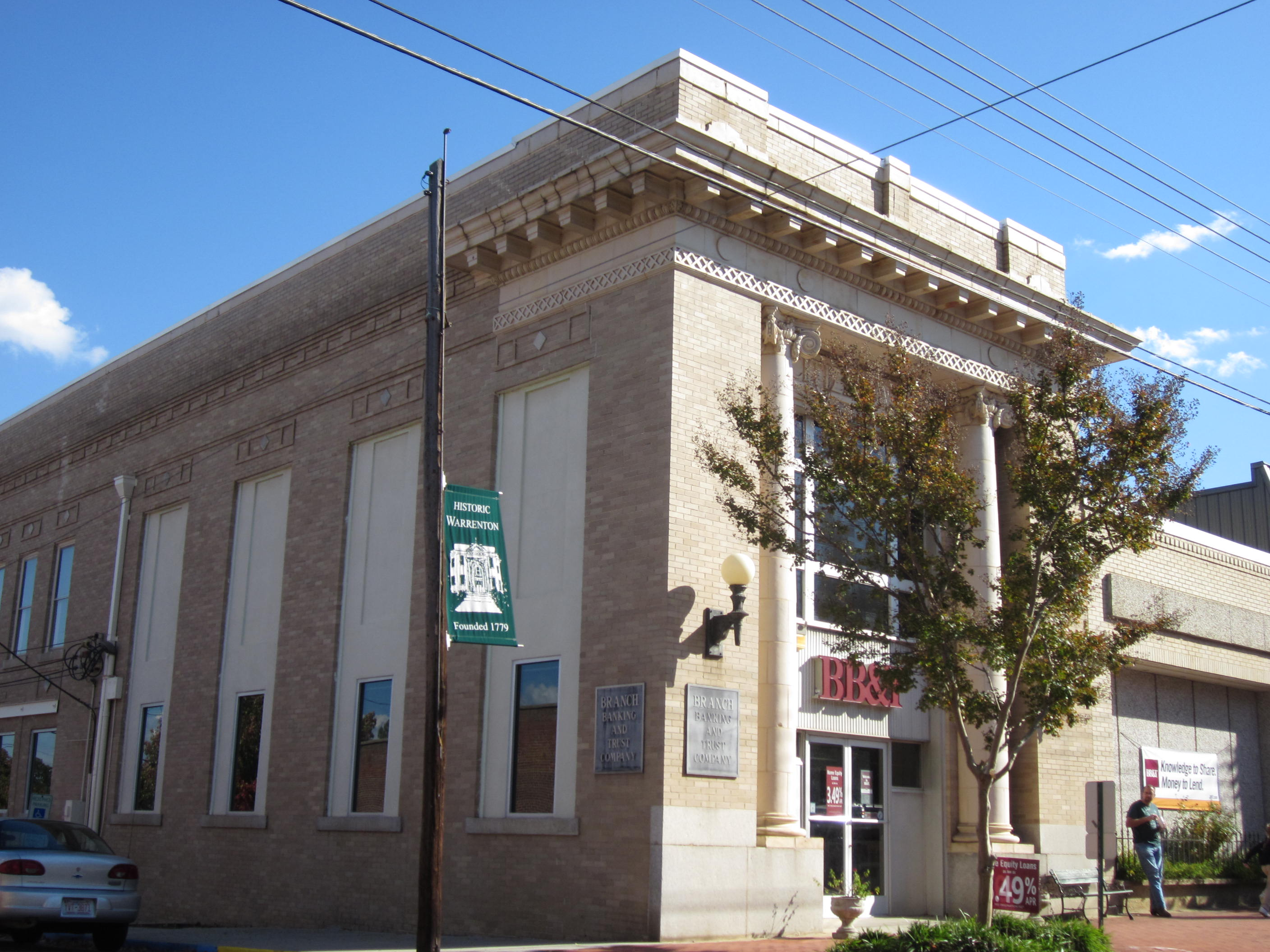
- Downtown bank

- Location within North Carolina Location within the United States
- Location: U.S. 401, Warrenton, North Carolina
- Coordinates: 36°23′42″N 78°9′18″W
- Built: 1840
- Architect: Multiple
- Architectural style: Early Republic, Greek Revival, Late Victorian
- NRHP reference No.: 76001347 (original); 100010195 (increase)

Significant dates
- Added to NRHP: August 11, 1976
- Boundary increase: April 4, 2024

Warrenton Historic District is a national historic district located at Warrenton, Warren County, North Carolina. The district encompasses 202 contributing buildings in the central business district and surrounding residential sections of Warrenton. The district developed between about 1840 and 1926, and includes notable examples of Early Republic, Greek Revival, and Late Victorian architecture. Notable buildings include the Falkener House, Macon Street House, Peter Davis Store, Jones-Cook House (c. 1810), Eaton Place (1843), Sommerville-Graham House (c. 1850) by Jacob W. Holt, Presbyterian Church also by Holt, Baptist Church, Methodist Episcopal Church, Miles Hardware Store, Warrenton City Hall, Warrenton Hotel, John Graham School, and the U.S. Post Office.

It was listed on the National Register of Historic Places in 1976, with boundary alterations approved in 2024.
