= Coleman-White House =

Historic house in North Carolina, United States

- U.S. National Register of Historic Places
- Location within North Carolina Location within the United States
- Location: Halifax and Hall Sts., Warrenton, North Carolina
- Coordinates: 36°23′28″N 78°9′15″W
- Area: 3 acres (1.2 ha)
- Built: 1821-1824
- Architectural style: Federal
- NRHP reference No.: 73001380
- Added to NRHP: October 25, 1973

Coleman-White House, also known as Whitesome, is a historic home located at Warrenton, Warren County, North Carolina. It was built between 1821 and 1824, and is a two-story, three-bay, late Federal style rectangular frame dwelling. It has a side gable roof, entrance porch with Tuscan order columns, and exterior end chimneys. At the rear is an earlier 1 1/2-story frame dwelling with a gable roof. The front facade features a Palladian entrance with sidelights and Tuscan colonnettes and Palladian window on the second level.

It was listed on the National Register of Historic Places in 1973.
