= William J. Hawkins House =

Historic house in North Carolina, United States

- U.S. National Register of Historic Places
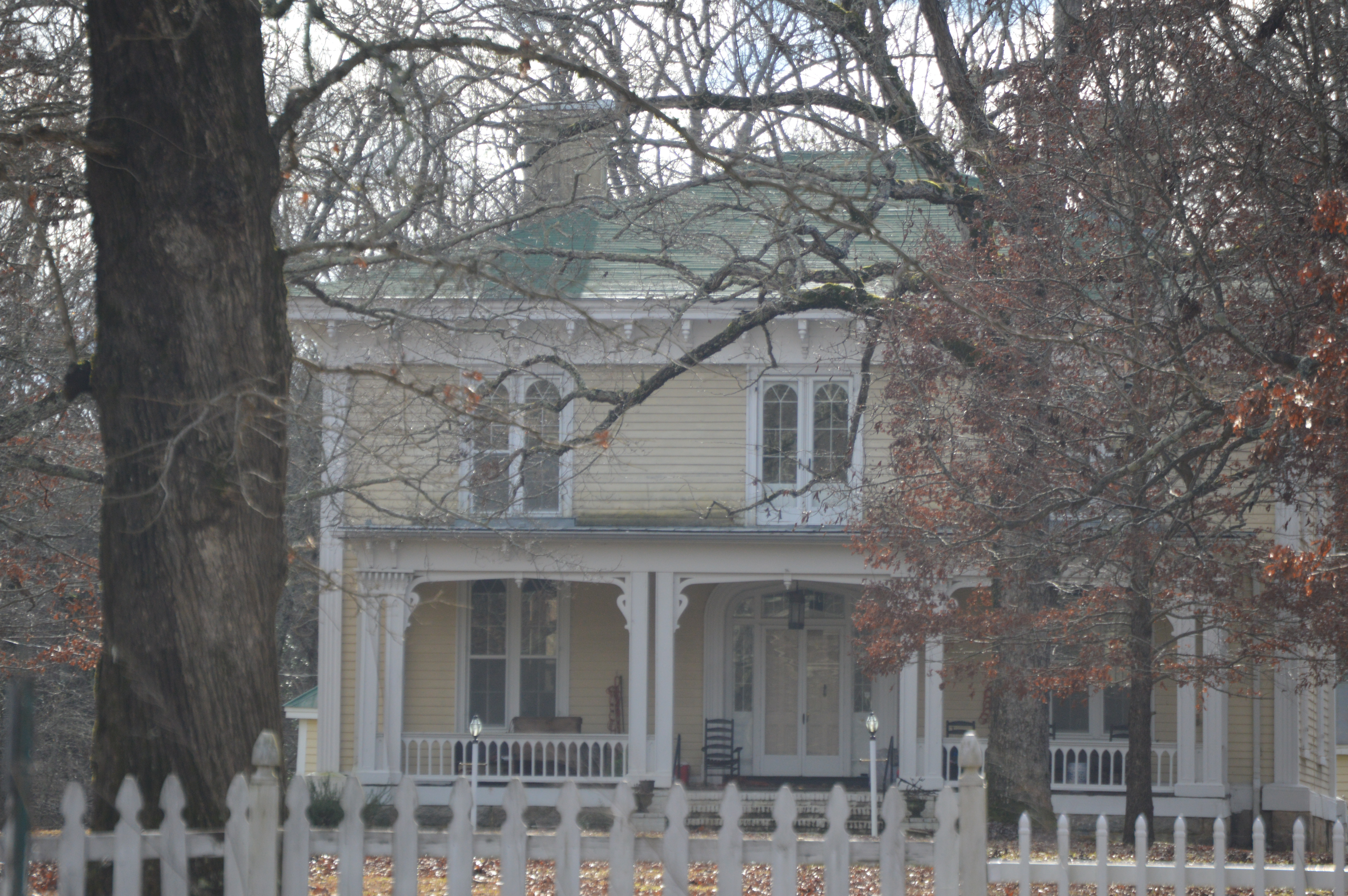
- Facade

- Location within North Carolina Location within the United States
- Location: W of Norlina on SR 1103, Ridgeway, North Carolina
- Coordinates: 36°25′38″N 78°14′40″W
- Area: 25 acres (10 ha)
- Built: c. 1855
- Architectural style: Greco-Italianate
- NRHP reference No.: 78001982
- Added to NRHP: May 22, 1978

William J. Hawkins House, also known as Oakley Hall, is a historic plantation house located near Ridgeway, Warren County, North Carolina. It was built about 1855, and is a two-story, three bay by two bay, Greco-Italianate style frame dwelling. It has a hipped roof with deep overhang and brackets and sits on a basement. The house's design and ornamentation reflect the influences of local builder Jacob W. Holt.

The original owner William J. Hawkins served as president of the Raleigh and Gaston Railroad from 1855 until 1875. The home was listed on the National Register of Historic Places in 1978.
