= John Watson House (Hiram, Maine) =

Historic house in Maine, United States

- U.S. National Register of Historic Places
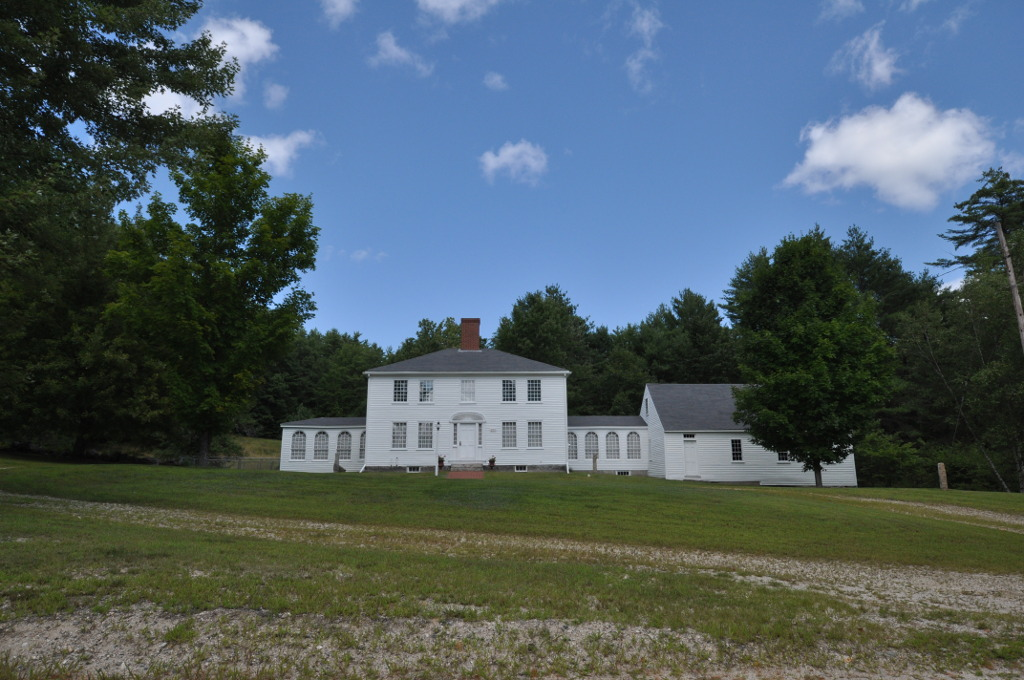

- Location within Maine Location within the United States
- Location: Benny Babb Hill Road, Hiram, Maine
- Coordinates: 43°53′51″N 70°48′53″W
- Area: 2 acres (0.81 ha)
- Built: 1785
- Architect: Watson, John
- Architectural style: Georgian
- NRHP reference No.: 74000183
- Added to NRHP: December 31, 1974

The John Watson House, also known as the Intervale Farm, is a historic house on Benny Babb Hill Road in Hiram, Maine. Built in 1785 by one of Hiram's first settlers, it is now the oldest building in the town, and is a well-preserved example of late Georgian architecture. It was listed on the National Register of Historic Places in 1974.

== Description and history ==
John Watson, a veteran of the American Revolutionary War, arrived in the area that is now Hiram in 1778, and established a homestead on the east bank of the Saco River. His first house was washed away by spring flooding in 1785, after which he built the present house on higher ground above the river.

The main block of the house Watson built is a large rectangular timber-frame structure, with a large central chimney, hip roof, and a cut granite foundation. The combination of hip roof and central chimney is particularly rare for houses of this period in Maine. The main facade is five bays wide, with a central entrance that has early 19th-century Federal style features, with sidelight windows above recessed panels, and a broad louvered fan above. The main block was extended in the early 20th century with 1 1/2-story Colonial Revival wings on either side, each with four round-arch windows. The wing on the right joins the house to a 1 1/2-story shed and garage, which were probably originally detached from the house.

The interior of the main block has retained much of its original material. A narrow and winding staircase leads up the second floor between the entrance vestibule and the chimney, and there are large rooms on either side. The kitchen, with a large open fireplace, is a long room that extends the width of the block behind the chimney. There are four bedrooms on the second floor.

== See also ==
- National Register of Historic Places listings in Oxford County, Maine
