= Liberia School =

Historic school building in North Carolina, United States

- U.S. National Register of Historic Places
- Location within North Carolina Location within the United States
- Location: 4.5 miles S of Warrenton, Sw side of NC 58, near Warrenton, North Carolina
- Coordinates: 36°21′42″N 78°6′3″W
- Area: 1 acre (0.40 ha)
- Built: 1921-1922
- Architectural style: Rosenwald School
- NRHP reference No.: 05000438
- Added to NRHP: May 18, 2005

Liberia School is a historic Rosenwald School located near Warrenton, Warren County, North Carolina. It was built in 1921–1922, and is a one-teacher frame school building. It measures approximately 20 feet by 32 feet. It has a hipped roof and small porch with a gable roof. The school remained open until the early 1950s. The Liberia School is one of 25 schools that were constructed using Rosenwald funds in Warren County. It was listed on the National Register of Historic Places in 2005.
