= Dalkeith (Arcola, North Carolina) =

Historic plantation house

- U.S. National Register of Historic Places
- Location within North Carolina Location within the United States
- Location: SW of Arcola off NC 43, near Arcola, North Carolina
- Coordinates: 36°16′47″N 77°59′12″W
- Area: 20 acres (8.1 ha)
- Built: c. 1825
- Architectural style: Federal
- NRHP reference No.: 74001382
- Added to NRHP: December 16, 1974

Dalkeith is a historic plantation house located near Arcola, Warren County, North Carolina. It was built about 1825, and is a two-story, late Federal style, temple-form frame dwelling. It has a gable roof and brick basement. The front facade features a pedimented entrance porch, with four fluted Doric order columns. The house is similar in style to Elgin. During the American Civil War Asa Biggs took refuge at Dalkeith, where he wrote his autobiography.

It was listed on the National Register of Historic Places in 1974.
