= Tusculum (Arcola, North Carolina) =

Historic house in North Carolina, United States

- U.S. National Register of Historic Places
- Location within North Carolina Location within the United States
- Location: SE of Warrenton off SR 1635, near Arcola, North Carolina
- Coordinates: 36°17′04″N 78°01′07″W
- Area: 20 acres (8.1 ha)
- Built: c. 1835
- Architectural style: Federal
- NRHP reference No.: 74001386
- Added to NRHP: October 23, 1974

Tusculum is a historic plantation house located near Arcola, Warren County, North Carolina. It was built about 1835, and is a two-story, five-bay, late Federal style frame dwelling. It has a gable roof, is sheathed in weatherboard, and has later shed roof porch. The front facade features a Palladian doorway with paneled pilasters and fanlight.

It was listed on the National Register of Historic Places in 1974.
