= John N. and Cornelia Watson House =

Historic house in Oregon, United States

- U.S. National Register of Historic Places
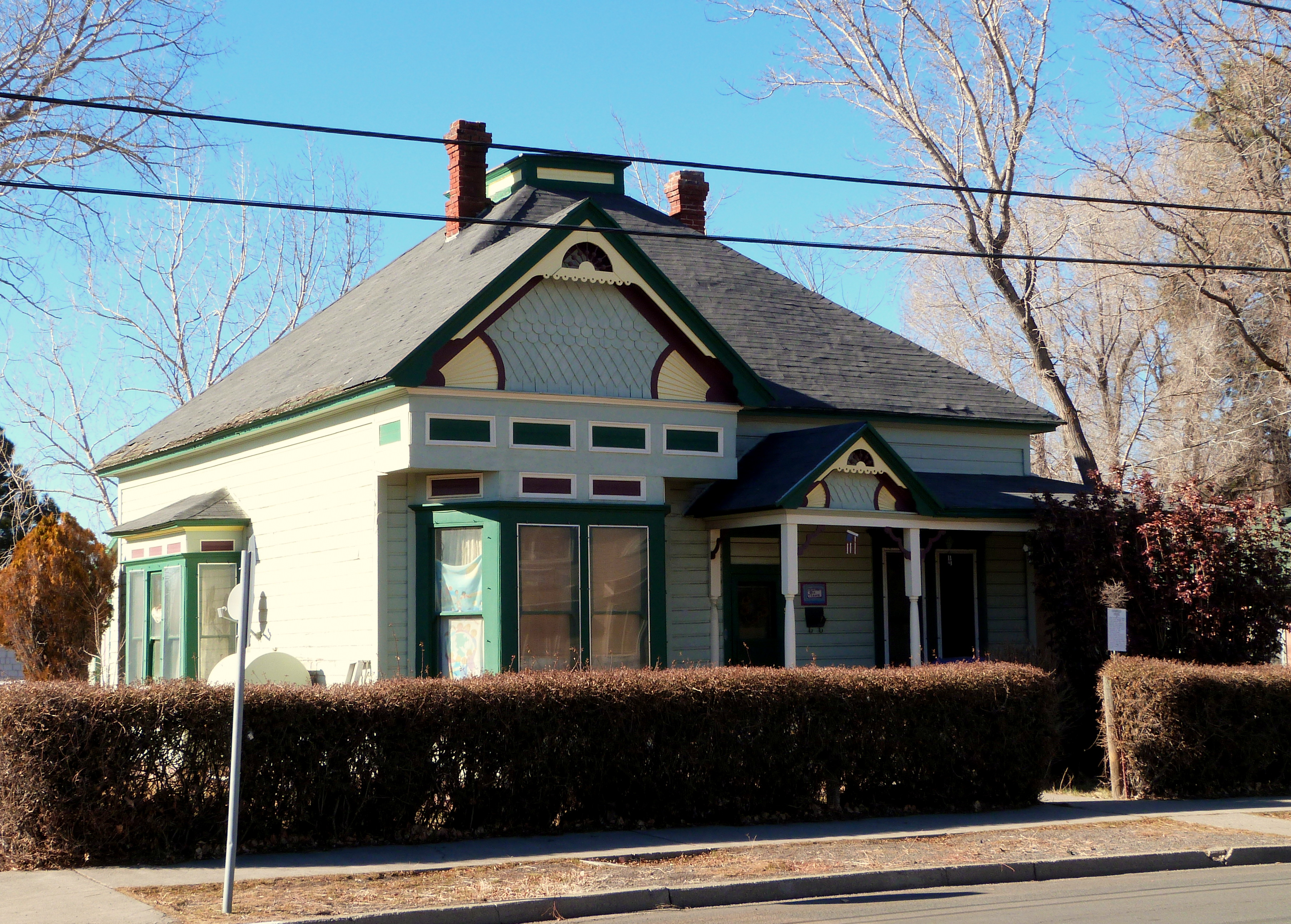
- The house's exterior in 2014

- Location within Oregon Location within the United States
- Location: 5 N. H Street; Lakeview, Oregon
- Coordinates: 42°11′23″N 120°20′55″W
- Area: 0.2 acres (0.081 ha)
- Built: 1905
- Architectural style: Queen Anne, Stick
- NRHP reference No.: 89000051
- Added to NRHP: 21 February 1989

The John N. and Cornelia Watson House is a historic house located in Lakeview, Oregon.

== Description and history ==
Built in 1905, the house reflects Queen Anne and Stick architectural styles.

The historic owner, John Watson, was nominated by Theodore Roosevelt and confirmed by the United States Senate for register of the United States General Land Office in Lakeview in 1903.

The property was listed on the National Register of Historic Places on February 21, 1989.

== See also ==
- Historic preservation
- National Register of Historic Places listings in Lake County, Oregon
