= Littleton, North Carolina =

- Town
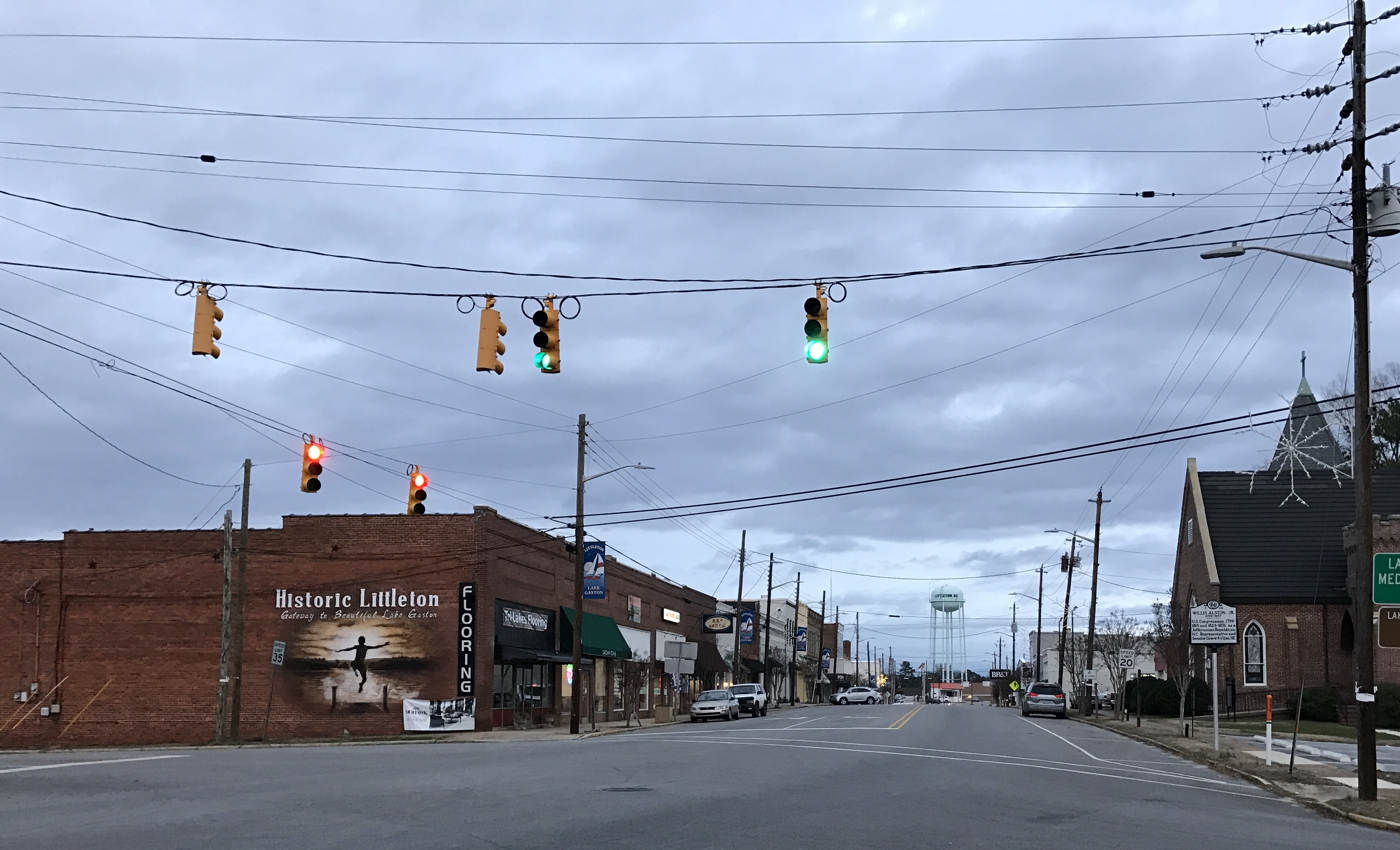
- Downtown Littleton along U.S. Route 158, January 2019

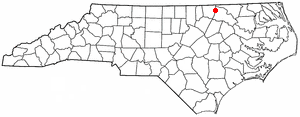
- Location of Littleton, North Carolina
- Coordinates: 36°26′04″N 77°54′40″W
- Country: United States
- State: North Carolina
- County: Halifax

Area
  - Total: 0.95 sq mi (2.46 km^{2})
  - Land: 0.95 sq mi (2.46 km^{2})
  - Water: 0 sq mi (0.00 km^{2})
- Elevation: 381 ft (116 m)

Population (2020)
  - Total: 559
  - Density: 587.7/sq mi (226.93/km^{2})
- Time zone: UTC-5 (Eastern (EST))
  - Summer (DST): UTC-4 (EDT)
- ZIP code: 27850
- Area code: 252
- FIPS code: 37-38680
- GNIS feature ID: 2406026
- Website: https://www.townoflittleton-nc.us/

Littleton is a town in Halifax County, North Carolina, United States. As of the 2020 census, Littleton had a population of 559. It is part of the Roanoke Rapids, North Carolina Micropolitan Statistical Area.

== History ==
Littleton was named after William Little, a state senator at the time of founding. In 1882, Littleton College for women was founded with an initial enrollment of eleven students. The college became relatively successful with a peak enrollment of 285 in 1908. On January 22, 1919, the college was destroyed by fire, and without an endowment, it was never rebuilt.

Person's Ordinary and St. Alban's Episcopal Church are listed on the National Register of Historic Places.

Originally Littleton was divided between the counties of Warren and Halifax, but on July 1, 1974, an election was made to make Littleton only to be a part of Halifax County.

Little Manor and the Dr. Charles and Susan Skinner House and Outbuildings are listed on the National Register of Historic Places.

== Geography ==
According to the United States Census Bureau, the town has a total area of 1.0 square mile (2.6 km^{2}), all land.

== Demographics ==
Historical population
| Census | Pop. | Note | %± |
|---|---|---|---|
| 1880 | 113 | | — |
| 1890 | 534 | | 372.6% |
| 1910 | 1,152 | | — |
| 1920 | 1,010 | | −12.3% |
| 1930 | 1,133 | | 12.2% |
| 1940 | 1,200 | | 5.9% |
| 1950 | 1,173 | | −2.2% |
| 1960 | 1,024 | | −12.7% |
| 1970 | 903 | | −11.8% |
| 1980 | 820 | | −9.2% |
| 1990 | 691 | | −15.7% |
| 2000 | 692 | | 0.1% |
| 2010 | 674 | | −2.6% |
| 2020 | 559 | | −17.1% |
U.S. Decennial Census

As of the census of 2000, there were 692 people, 333 households, and 201 families residing in the town. The population density was 720.5 people per square mile (278.2 people/km^{2}). There were 378 housing units at an average density of 393.6 per square mile (152.0/km^{2}). The racial makeup of the town was 54.34% White, 42.77% African American, 0.29% Native American, 0.43% Asian, 1.16% from other races, and 1.01% from two or more races. Hispanic or Latino of any race were 1.16% of the population.

There were 333 households, out of which 21.3% had children under the age of 18 living with them, 35.7% were married couples living together, 20.1% had a female householder with no husband present, and 39.6% were non-families. 38.7% of all households were made up of individuals, and 20.4% had someone living alone who was 65 years of age or older. The average household size was 2.08 and the average family size was 2.70.

In the town, the population was spread out, with 21.5% under the age of 18, 5.3% from 18 to 24, 20.2% from 25 to 44, 25.7% from 45 to 64, and 27.2% who were 65 years of age or older. The median age was 47 years. For every 100 females, there were 68.8 males. For every 100 females age 18 and over, there were 65.5 males.

The median income for a household in the town was $23,182, and the median income for a family was $37,500. Males had a median income of $29,583 versus $22,375 for females. The per capita income for the town was $15,901. About 19.1% of families and 22.3% of the population were below the poverty line, including 25.6% of those under age 18 and 17.5% of those age 65 or over.

== Attractions ==
Littleton is home to the Cryptozoology & Paranormal Museum, AKA Bigfoot Museum. as well as the Roanoke Valley Veterans Museum

== Notable people ==
- Henry H. Falkener, One of four charter faculty members of NC A&T's State University founding in 1891 United States Senate from North Carolina 19th district, Littleton, Warren County, North Carolina the session of 1889
- Willis Alston, United States Congressman from North Carolina
- Ella Baker, Civil Rights leader, SNCC founder
- William H. Hicks, member of the New Jersey General Assembly from 1972 to 1976
- P. B. Young, founder of the Norfolk Journal and Guide
