= Dr. Charles and Susan Skinner House and Outbuildings =

Historic house in North Carolina, United States

- U.S. National Register of Historic Places
- Location within North Carolina Location within the United States
- Location: NC 1528, 0.25 miles SW of NC 158, near Littleton, North Carolina
- Coordinates: 36°25′37″N 77°56′16″W
- Area: 6.2 acres (2.5 ha)
- Built: 1840-1844
- Architect: Thomas Bragg, Albert G. Jones
- Architectural style: Greek Revival
- NRHP reference No.: 00001186
- Added to NRHP: October 6, 2000

Dr. Charles and Susan Skinner House and Outbuildings, also known as Linden Hall, is a historic plantation house located in Warren County, North Carolina near the town of Littleton. It was built between 1840 and 1844, and is a two-story, three-bay, single-pile, T-shaped Greek Revival style frame dwelling with a hipped roof. It has two hemioctagonal wings and three porches. Also on the property are the contributing kitchen (1840-1844), dairy (1840-1844), smokehouse (1840-1844), necessary (1840-1844), and two dependencies (1840-1844).

It was listed on the National Register of Historic Places in 2000.

== See also ==
- Little Manor, another plantation house near the town of Littleton
