= John Watson House (Warrenton, North Carolina) =

Historic house in North Carolina, United States

- U.S. National Register of Historic Places
- Location within North Carolina Location within the United States
- Location: Petway Burwell Rd., 1/4 miles W of NC 401, Warrenton, North Carolina
- Coordinates: 36°21′50″N 78°10′58″W
- Built: 1855
- Architect: Jacob Holt
- Architectural style: Italianate, Greek Revival, Georgian, Federal
- NRHP reference No.: 90001954
- Added to NRHP: December 28, 1990

The John Watson House, now called The Historic Magnolia Manor, also known as Burwell House, is a historic plantation house located at Warrenton, Warren County, North Carolina.

It was listed on the National Register of Historic Places in 1990.

== History ==
The original Georgian / Federal style farm house was originally built about 1815. John Watson acquired the property in the 1830s. Warson hired Jacob W. Holt in 1859 to do the overbuild on the original house. He added the two-story, Greek Revival style main block. It is overlaid with ornate Italianate style detail at the roofline and on the full-width front porch. In 1997 the Carver family acquired the property. In 2003 the Carver family turned the house into a bed & breakfast. In 2019, the Youakim family acquired the property and uses it as a wedding venue.
