= Geography of St. Louis =

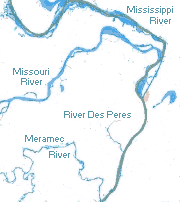
The Rivers around St. Louis

St. Louis, Missouri, is located at 38°38′53″N 90°12′44″W.

The city is built primarily on bluffs and terraces that rise 100–200 feet (30–61 m) above the western banks of the Mississippi River, just south of the Missouri-Mississippi confluence. Much of the area is a fertile and gently rolling prairie that features low hills and broad, shallow valleys. Both the Mississippi River and the Missouri River have cut large valleys with wide flood plains.

Limestone and dolomite of the Mississippian epoch underlies the area and much of the city is a karst area, with numerous sinkholes and caves, although most of the caves have been sealed shut; many springs are visible along the riverfront. Significant deposits of coal, brick clay, and millerite ore were once mined in the city, and the predominant surface rock, the St. Louis Limestone, is used as dimension stone and rubble for construction.

The St. Louis Geologic fault is exposed along the bluffs and was the source of several historic minor earthquakes; it is part of the St. Louis Anticline which has some petroleum and natural gas deposits outside of the city. St. Louis is also just north of the New Madrid Seismic Zone which in 1811–12 produced a series of earthquakes that are the largest known in the contiguous United States. Seismologists estimate 90% probability of a magnitude 6.0 earthquake by 2040 and 7-10% probability of a magnitude 8.0, such tremors could create significant damage across a large region of the central U.S. including St. Louis.

Near the southern boundary of the City of St. Louis (separating it from St. Louis County) is the River des Peres, virtually the only river or stream within the city limits that is not entirely underground. Most of River des Peres was either channelized or put underground in the 1920s and early 1930s. The lower section of the river was the site of some of the worst flooding of the Great Flood of 1993.

Near the central, western boundary of the city is Forest Park, site of the 1904 World's fair, the Louisiana Purchase Exposition of 1904, and the 1904 Summer Olympics, the first Olympic Games held in North America. At the time, St. Louis was the fourth most populous city in the United States.

The Missouri River forms the northern border of St. Louis County, exclusive of a few areas where the river has changed its course. The Meramec River forms most of its southern border. To the east is the City and the Mississippi River.

According to the United States Census Bureau, the city has a total area of 171.3 km^{2} (66.2 mi^{2}). 160.4 km^{2} (61.9 mi^{2}) of it is land and 11.0 km^{2} (4.2 mi^{2} or 6.39%) of it is water.

== Metropolitan statistical area ==
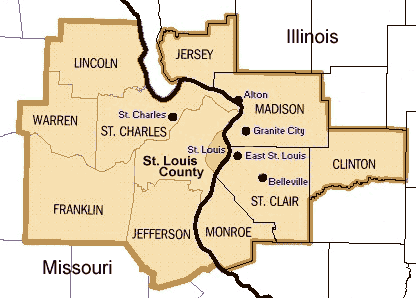
The St. Louis Metropolitan Statistical Area.

The St. Louis Metropolitan Statistical Area is the 23rd largest by population in the United States, with 2,820,253 as of 2020. It includes St. Louis County (1,004,125), the independent City of St. Louis (301,578), the Missouri counties of Saint Charles (405,262), Jefferson (226,739), Franklin (104,682), Lincoln (59,574) and Warren (35,532), and the Illinois counties of Madison (265,859), Saint Clair (257,400), Macoupin (44,967), Clinton (36,899), Monroe (34,962), Jersey (21,512), Bond (16,725), and Calhoun (4,437).

== Cityscape ==
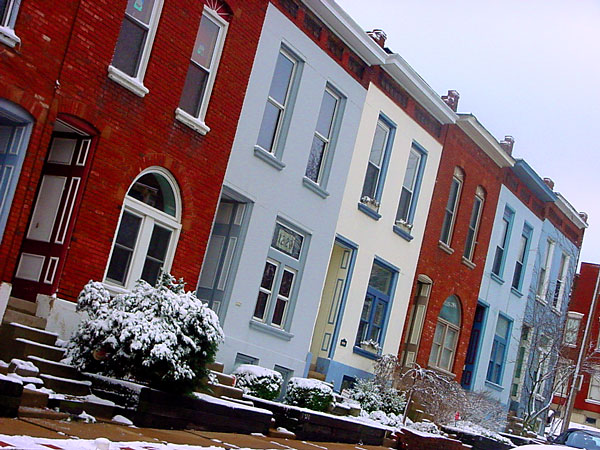
Lafayette Square Homes

The city is divided into 79 neighborhoods. The divisions have no legal standing, although some neighborhood associations administer grants or hold veto power over historic-district development. Nevertheless, the social and political influence of neighborhood identity is profound. Some hold avenues of massive stone edifices built as palaces for heads of state visiting the 1904 World's Fair. Others offer tidy working-class bungalows, loft districts, or areas hard-hit by social problems and unemployment. Many of them have retained - quite consciously and deliberately - a camaraderie that is missing from many American towns today.

Among the best-known, architecturally significant, or well-visited neighborhoods are Downtown, Midtown, Benton Park, Carondelet, the Central West End, Clayton/Tamm (Dogtown), Dutchtown South, Forest Park Southeast, Grand Center, The Hill, Lafayette Square, Shaw (home to the Missouri Botanical Garden and named after the Garden's founder, Henry Shaw), Southwest Garden, Soulard, Tower Grove East, Tower Grove South, Hortense Place and Wydown/Skinker.

== Climate ==
St. Louis

Climate chart (precipitation, max. and min. temperature)
J	F	M	A	M	J	J	A	S	O	N	D
2.4 40 24	2.2 45 28	3.3 56 37	3.7 67 47	4.7 76 57	4.3 85 67	4.1 89 71	3 88 69	3.1 80 61	3.3 68 49	3.9 56 38	2.8 42 27
- █ Average max. and min. temperatures in °F
- █ Precipitation totals in inches
- Source: "NWS St. Louis, MO (LSX)"
Metric conversion
J	F	M	A	M	J	J	A	S	O	N	D
61 4 −5	57 7 −2	84 13 3	94 20 8	120 25 14	109 30 19	104 32 22	76 31 21	80 27 16	85 20 9	99 13 3	72 6 −3
- █ Average max. and min. temperatures in °C
- █ Precipitation totals in mm

The climate is a mix between the humid continental(Köppen: Dfa) climate to its north and the humid subtropical(Köppen: Cfa) to its south. It straddles the border between USDA Plant Hardiness Zones 6B and 7A, indicating the coldest temperature of the year is typically around 0 °F (−18 °C). With neither large mountains nor large bodies of water to moderate its temperature, it is subject to both cold Arctic air and hot, humid tropical air from the Gulf of Mexico. The city has four distinct seasons. Spring is the wettest season and produces frequent severe weather. Summers are hot and humid; temperatures of 90 °F (32 °C) or higher occur 43 days a year. The average window for such temperatures is May 19 thru September 14.

Fall is mild with lower humidity and can produce intermittent bouts of heavy rainfall with the first freeze of the season on average falling on November 2 (the last on average falls on April 3); the first measurable (0.1 inches (0.25 cm)) snow, often not counting flurries, on average occurs on December 4 (the last on average falls on March 17). Winters can be cold and snowy with temperatures frequently below freezing. Winter storm systems, such as Alberta clippers and Panhandle hooks, can bring days of heavy freezing rain, ice pellets, and snowfall.

The average annual temperature recorded at nearby Lambert–St. Louis International Airport, is 57.1 °F (13.9 °C), and average precipitation is about 41.0 inches (1,040 mm). The daily average temperature in July is 80.0 °F (26.7 °C), while in January it is 31.8 °F (−0.1 °C), although this varies from year to year. Both 100 °F (37.8 °C) and 0 °F (−17.8 °C) temperatures can be seen on an average 2 or 3 days per year. The official record low is −22 °F (−30 °C) on January 5, 1884, although there were unofficial readings of −23 °F (−31 °C) on January 29, 1873; and the record high is 115 °F (46 °C) on July 14, 1954; the coldest high on record was −5 °F (−21 °C) on December 24, 1983, while, conversely, the warmest low on record was 86 °F (30 °C) on July 25, 2012 and July 24, 1901. July 2012 was the hottest month in the 138-year recorded weather temperatures in St. Louis history starting in 1874, with an average daily temperature of 88.1 °F (31.2 °C). Average annual temperatures are "about 3 degrees warmer" overall than they were in the 1920s.

Winter (December through February) is the driest season, with an average 7.5 in (191 mm) of precipitation. The average seasonal snowfall is 18.2 inches (46 cm), typically falling from December to March. The heaviest one-day snowfall total was 12.8 in (32.5 cm) on February 26, 1906. Spring (March through May) is typically the wettest season, with 4.7 in (119 mm) of precipitation; however, the heaviest 24-hour rainfall total was 9.04 in (229.6 mm) on July 26, 2022. Dry spells lasting one to two weeks are common during the growing seasons.

St. Louis experiences thunderstorms 48 days a year on average. Especially in the spring, these storms can often be severe, with high winds, large hail and tornadoes. Lying within the hotbed of Tornado Alley, St. Louis reigns as one of the most frequently tornadic metropolitan areas, and has an extensive history of particularly damaging tornadoes. Severe flooding, such as the Great Flood of 1993, may occur in spring and summer; the (often rapid) melting of thick snow cover upstream either the Missouri or Mississippi Rivers can contribute to springtime flooding.

Some late autumns feature the warm weather known as Indian summer; some years see roses in bloom as late as early December.

Climate data for St. Louis, Missouri (Lambert–St. Louis Int'l), 1991–2020 normals, (Note: Mean monthly maxima and minima (i.e. the highest and lowest temperature readings during an entire month or year) calculated based on data at said location from 1991 to 2020.) extremes 1874–present (Note: Official records for St. Louis were kept at the Weather Bureau Office from January 1874 to December 1892, Eads Bridge from January 1893 to December 1929, and at Lambert–St. Louis Int'l since January 1930.)
Month	Jan	Feb	Mar	Apr	May	Jun	Jul	Aug	Sep	Oct	Nov	Dec	Year
Record high °F (°C)	77 (25)	85 (29)	92 (33)	93 (34)	98 (37)	108 (42)	115 (46)	110 (43)	104 (40)	94 (34)	86 (30)	78 (26)	115 (46)
Mean maximum °F (°C)	64.7 (18.2)	71.0 (21.7)	79.4 (26.3)	86.4 (30.2)	90.4 (32.4)	95.5 (35.3)	99.2 (37.3)	99.1 (37.3)	93.4 (34.1)	87.0 (30.6)	75.5 (24.2)	66.9 (19.4)	100.7 (38.2)
Mean daily maximum °F (°C)	40.4 (4.7)	45.8 (7.7)	56.6 (13.7)	68.0 (20.0)	77.1 (25.1)	85.9 (29.9)	89.6 (32.0)	88.3 (31.3)	81.1 (27.3)	69.2 (20.7)	55.5 (13.1)	44.5 (6.9)	66.8 (19.3)
Daily mean °F (°C)	32.1 (0.1)	36.7 (2.6)	46.6 (8.1)	57.5 (14.2)	67.5 (19.7)	76.5 (24.7)	80.4 (26.9)	78.8 (26.0)	71.0 (21.7)	59.1 (15.1)	46.5 (8.1)	36.5 (2.5)	57.4 (14.1)
Mean daily minimum °F (°C)	23.8 (−4.6)	27.6 (−2.4)	36.7 (2.6)	47.0 (8.3)	57.9 (14.4)	67.2 (19.6)	71.1 (21.7)	69.3 (20.7)	60.9 (16.1)	49.1 (9.5)	37.4 (3.0)	28.5 (−1.9)	48.0 (8.9)
Mean minimum °F (°C)	4.4 (−15.3)	9.6 (−12.4)	17.8 (−7.9)	32.2 (0.1)	43.5 (6.4)	55.5 (13.1)	61.4 (16.3)	60.1 (15.6)	47.1 (8.4)	33.6 (0.9)	22.0 (−5.6)	11.0 (−11.7)	1.2 (−17.1)
Record low °F (°C)	−22 (−30)	−18 (−28)	−5 (−21)	20 (−7)	31 (−1)	43 (6)	51 (11)	47 (8)	32 (0)	21 (−6)	1 (−17)	−16 (−27)	−22 (−30)
Average precipitation inches (mm)	2.59 (66)	2.23 (57)	3.50 (89)	4.73 (120)	4.82 (122)	4.49 (114)	3.93 (100)	3.38 (86)	2.96 (75)	3.15 (80)	3.42 (87)	2.50 (64)	41.70 (1,059)
Average snowfall inches (cm)	5.7 (14)	4.3 (11)	2.3 (5.8)	0.2 (0.51)	0.0 (0.0)	0.0 (0.0)	0.0 (0.0)	0.0 (0.0)	0.0 (0.0)	0.0 (0.0)	0.9 (2.3)	3.2 (8.1)	16.6 (42)
Average precipitation days (≥ 0.01 in)	9.3	8.7	10.8	11.5	12.6	9.8	8.9	8.4	7.3	8.5	9.0	9.0	113.8
Average snowy days (≥ 0.1 in)	4.7	3.9	1.7	0.2	0.0	0.0	0.0	0.0	0.0	0.0	0.8	3.2	14.5
Average relative humidity (%)	73.0	72.0	68.3	63.5	66.5	67.1	68.0	70.0	71.6	68.7	72.2	75.8	69.7
Average dew point °F (°C)	20.1 (−6.6)	24.1 (−4.4)	33.1 (0.6)	42.3 (5.7)	52.9 (11.6)	62.1 (16.7)	66.6 (19.2)	65.1 (18.4)	58.6 (14.8)	46.0 (7.8)	36.0 (2.2)	25.5 (−3.6)	44.4 (6.9)
Mean monthly sunshine hours	161.2	158.3	198.3	223.5	266.5	291.9	308.9	269.8	236.1	208.4	140.9	129.9	2,593.7
Percentage possible sunshine	53	53	53	56	60	66	68	64	63	60	47	44	58
Average ultraviolet index	1.7	2.7	4.5	6.4	7.9	9.0	9.1	8.2	6.3	4.0	2.3	—	—
Source 1: NOAA (relative humidity, dew point, and sun 1961−1990)
Source 2: UV Index Today (1995 to 2022)

See or edit raw graph data.

== Flora and fauna ==
Before the founding of the city, the area was prairie and open forest maintained by burning by Native Americans. Trees are mainly oak, maple, and hickory, similar to the forests of the nearby Ozarks; common understory trees include eastern redbud, serviceberry, and flowering dogwood. Riparian areas are forested with mainly American sycamore. Most of the residential area of the city is planted with large native shade trees. The largest native forest area is found in Forest Park. In autumn, the changing color of the trees is notable. Most species here are typical of the Eastern Woodland, although numerous decorative non-native species are found; the most notable invasive species is Japanese honeysuckle, which is actively removed from some parks.

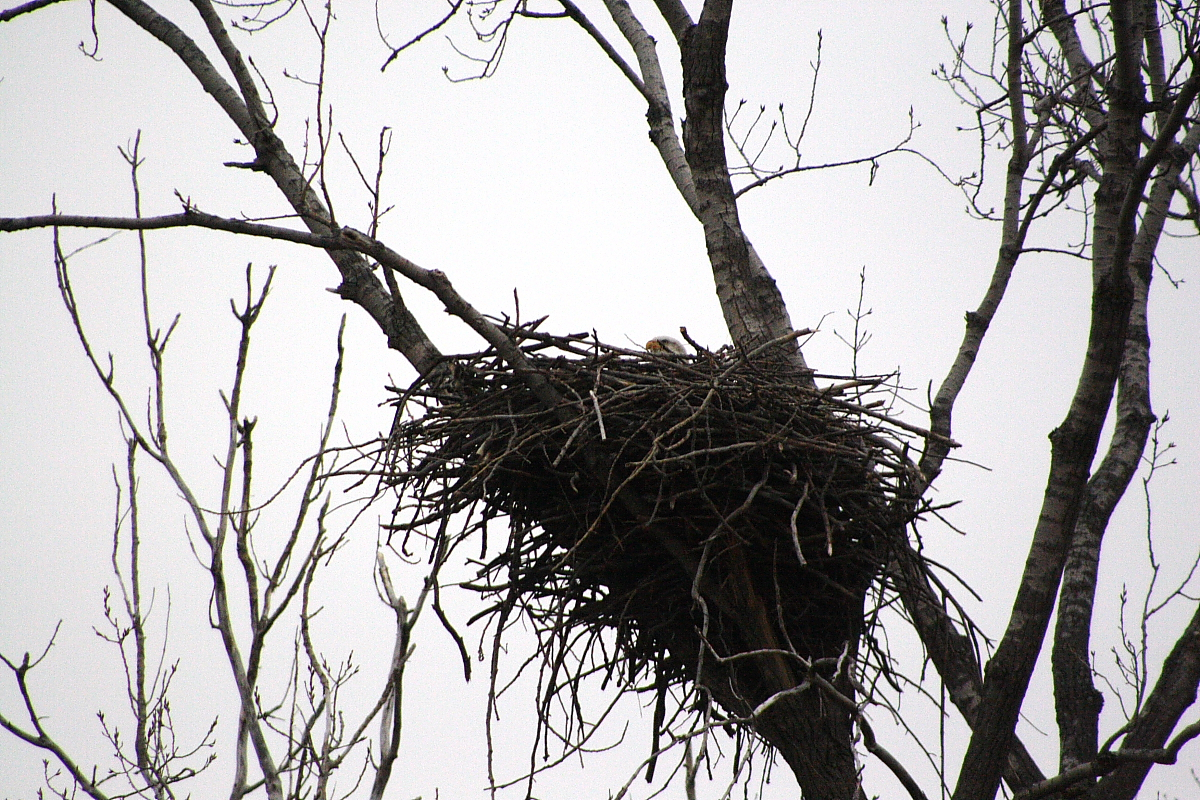
Female bald eagle on an egg in nest near Chain of Rocks Bridge

Large mammals found in the city include urbanized coyotes and occasionally a stray whitetail deer. Eastern gray squirrel, cottontail rabbit, and other rodents are abundant, as well as the nocturnal and rarely seen opossum. Groundhogs are a common sight along the Mississippi River, and beaver are also seen. Large bird species are abundant in parks and include Canada goose, mallard duck, as well as shorebirds, including the great egret and great blue heron. Gulls are common along the Mississippi River; these species typically follow barge traffic. Large flocks of feral pigeons make their home at the Eads Bridge and MLK Bridge. Winter populations of bald eagles are found by the Mississippi River around the Chain of Rocks Bridge. The city is on the Mississippi Flyway, used by migrating birds, and has a large variety of small bird species, common to the eastern U.S. The Eurasian tree sparrow, an introduced species, is limited in North America to the counties surrounding St. Louis. Tower Grove Park is a well-known birdwatching area in the city.

Frogs are commonly found in the springtime, especially after extensive wet periods. Common species include the American toad and species of chorus frogs, commonly called "spring peepers" that are found in nearly every pond. Some years have outbreaks of cicadas or ladybugs. Mosquitos and houseflies are common insect nuisances; because of this, windows are nearly universally fitted with screens, and "screened-in" porches are common in homes of the area. Populations of honey bees have sharply declined in recent years, and numerous species of pollinator insects have filled their ecological niche.

== Adjacent communities ==
The following communities border the city of St. Louis directly:

- Cahokia, Illinois
- East Carondelet, Illinois
- East St. Louis, Illinois
- Madison, Illinois
- Sauget, Illinois
- Bellefontaine Neighbors, Missouri
- Clayton, Missouri
- Glasgow Village, Missouri
- Hillsdale, Missouri
- Jennings, Missouri
- Lemay, Missouri
- Mackenzie, Missouri
- Maplewood, Missouri
- Pine Lawn, Missouri
- Richmond Heights, Missouri
- Riverview, Missouri
- Shrewsbury, Missouri
- Spanish Lake, Missouri
- University City, Missouri
- Wellston, Missouri

In addition to the above named places, there are unincorporated parts of Madison County, Illinois; St. Clair County, Illinois; and St. Louis County, Missouri which border St. Louis. The Illinois communities of Brooklyn and Venice lie across the Mississippi River, but do not border St. Louis because the river itself is not part of their territory.

== See also ==
- Climate of Missouri
