= St. George, Missouri =

- Unincorporated community Census-designated place Former incorporated city
- Location of St. George, Missouri
- Coordinates: 38°32′15″N 90°18′43″W
- Country: United States
- State: Missouri
- County: St. Louis
- Township: Concord

Area
  - Total: 0.24 sq mi (0.62 km^{2})
  - Land: 0.24 sq mi (0.62 km^{2})
  - Water: 0 sq mi (0.00 km^{2})
- Elevation: 515 ft (157 m)

Population (2020)
  - Total: 1,553
  - Density: 6,445.2/sq mi (2,488.49/km^{2})
- Time zone: UTC-6 (Central (CST))
  - Summer (DST): UTC-5 (CDT)
- ZIP code: 63123
- Area code(s): 314/557
- FIPS code: 29-64370
- GNIS feature ID: 2791159

St. George or Saint George is an unincorporated community, census-designated place (CDP), and former incorporated city in Concord Township, St. Louis County, Missouri, United States. The population was 1,553 at the 2020 census.

On November 8, 2011, St. George residents voted 345–128 to disincorporate. The city became part of unincorporated St. Louis County.

== Geography ==
According to the United States Census Bureau, the city had a total area of 0.19 square miles (0.49 km^{2}), all land.

== Demographics ==
Historical population
Census	Pop.	Note	%±
2000	1,288		—
2010	1,337		3.8%
2020	1,553		16.2%
U.S. Decennial Census

According to city financial reports obtained from the Missouri State Auditor's office, approximately 28 percent of its 2005 municipal budget came from traffic citations.

=== Racial and ethnic composition ===
St. George CDP, Missouri – Racial and ethnic composition Note: the US Census treats Hispanic/Latino as an ethnic category. This table excludes Latinos from the racial categories and assigns them to a separate category. Hispanics/Latinos may be of any race.
Race / Ethnicity (NH = Non-Hispanic)	Pop 2000	Pop 2010	Pop 2020	% 2000	% 2010	% 2020
White alone (NH)	1,264	1,270	1,381	98.14%	94.99%	88.92%
Black or African American alone (NH)	0	7	39	0.00%	0.52%	2.51%
Native American or Alaska Native alone (NH)	0	4	0	0.00%	0.30%	0.00%
Asian alone (NH)	6	14	25	0.47%	1.05%	1.61%
Native Hawaiian or Pacific Islander alone (NH)	0	0	0	0.00%	0.00%	0.00%
Other race alone (NH)	0	2	11	0.00%	0.15%	0.71%
Mixed race or Multiracial (NH)	8	22	53	0.62%	1.65%	3.41%
Hispanic or Latino (any race)	10	18	44	0.78%	1.35%	2.83%
Total	1,288	1,337	1,553	100.00%	100.00%	100.00%

=== 2020 census ===
As of the 2020 census, St. George had a population of 1,553. The median age was 41.6 years. 18.0% of residents were under the age of 18 and 19.1% of residents were 65 years of age or older. For every 100 females, there were 86.7 males, and for every 100 females age 18 and over, there were 85.2 males age 18 and over.

100.0% of residents lived in urban areas, while 0.0% lived in rural areas.

There were 759 households in St. George, of which 20.7% had children under the age of 18 living in them. Of all households, 35.7% were married-couple households, 22.1% were households with a male householder and no spouse or partner present, and 35.8% were households with a female householder and no spouse or partner present. About 42.0% of all households were made up of individuals, and 19.5% had someone living alone who was 65 years of age or older.

There were 815 housing units, of which 6.9% were vacant. The homeowner vacancy rate was 3.6% and the rental vacancy rate was 0.0%.

=== 2010 census ===
As of the census of 2010, there were 1,337 people, 673 households, and 320 families living in the city. The population density was 7,036.8 inhabitants per square mile (2,716.9/km^{2}). There were 724 housing units at an average density of 3,810.5 per square mile (1,471.2/km^{2}). The racial makeup of the city was 96.2% White, 0.5% African American, 0.4% Native American, 1.0% Asian, 0.1% from other races, and 1.6% from two or more races. Hispanic or Latino of any race were 1.3% of the population.

There were 673 households, of which 21.1% had children under the age of 18 living with them, 31.1% were married couples living together, 12.6% had a female householder with no husband present, 3.9% had a male householder with no wife present, and 52.5% were non-families. 44.4% of all households were made up of individuals, and 21.6% had someone living alone who was 65 years of age or older. The average household size was 1.99 and the average family size was 2.79.

The median age in the city was 41.7 years. 17.7% of residents were under the age of 18; 7.1% were between the ages of 18 and 24; 28.7% were from 25 to 44; 26.5% were from 45 to 64; and 20.1% were 65 years of age or older. The gender makeup of the city was 45.8% male and 54.2% female.

=== 2000 census ===
As of the census of 2000, there were 1,288 people, 700 households, and 322 families living in the city. The population density was 6,949.0 inhabitants per square mile (2,683.0/km^{2}). There were 724 housing units at an average density of 3,906.1 per square mile (1,508.2/km^{2}). The racial makeup of the city was 98.84% White, 0.47% Asian, 0.08% from other races, and 0.62% from two or more races. Hispanic or Latino of any race were 0.78% of the population.

There were 700 households, out of which 16.3% had children under the age of 18 living with them, 33.0% were married couples living together, 11.0% had a female householder with no husband present, and 53.9% were non-families. 49.1% of all households were made up of individuals, and 26.0% had someone living alone who was 65 years of age or older. The average household size was 1.84 and the average family size was 2.68.

In the city the population was spread out, with 15.5% under the age of 18, 6.3% from 18 to 24, 26.8% from 25 to 44, 23.4% from 45 to 64, and 28.0% who were 65 years of age or older. The median age was 46 years. For every 100 females, there were 73.4 males. For every 100 females age 18 and over, there were 70.5 males.

The median income for a household in the city was $33,832, and the median income for a family was $43,681. Males had a median income of $31,250 versus $28,967 for females. The per capita income for the city was $21,924. About 2.4% of families and 3.1% of the population were below the poverty line, including 6.5% of those under age 18 and 1.8% of those age 65 or over.

== Police misconduct ==
=== Suspension and firing of Sgt. James Kuehnlein ===
On September 7, 2007, Brett Darrow, a St. Louis City resident, created an Internet sensation after posting an online video of an encounter with St. George police Sgt. James Kuehnlein. In the video, Kuehnlein approaches Darrow while he waits in a parked car in a commuter parking lot. When Darrow asks Kuehnlein whether he did anything wrong, the officer orders Darrow out of the car and threatens to fabricate charges and arrest him.

Darrow told the news media that he pulled into the commuter lot to meet a friend. When the officer asked him for identification, Darrow said he did not immediately present it because he believed the officer stopped him without probable cause. After the video gained popularity on the Internet, Kuehnlein was suspended without pay. In response, St. George Police Chief Scott Uhrig said, "I was very displeased when I saw the actions on the video."

The press later revealed that Sgt. Kuehnlein had been previously arrested for assault and theft, and in late September, he was fired by the city's Board of Aldermen in a 5–0 vote.

In 2013, Kuehnlein was fired from the police department in Velda City, Missouri after a conviction for domestic violence. He was given a five-year suspended sentence, despite his prior criminal record.

=== Sexual harassment allegations ===
In 2000, St. George Police Chief Scott Uhrig, while serving as an Arnold, Missouri patrol officer, was accused of sexually harassing a 17-year-old girl during a traffic stop. The State Administrative Hearing Commission found that Scott Uhrig called the teenager "beautiful, hot and tempting". Uhrig also allegedly asked the teen to come to his car for sex. Although Uhrig maintained his innocence, the Commission believed Uhrig acted illegally. They said his unwarranted sexual advances showed he could not enforce the law and were cause for discipline. Uhrig was suspended without pay and put on probation. Several years later, he took the helm at the St. George Police Department.

In December 2009, Uhrig was arrested for sexual misconduct with a child under 15. Although the St. George Police Department was disbanded in late 2008, these charges allege that the crimes took place while Uhrig was chief of the department. He was ultimately found not guilty.

=== Speed Trap Designation ===
From the early 1980s to c. 2011, St. George was known as a speed trap, though the speed trap itself was never able to provide sufficient revenue to pay the city's debts, as reported in May 2022 by Reason magazine, "...the town was deep in debt even before the speed trap ended—St. George voted 345–128 in favor of dissolution in November 2011."

== Arrests of Mayor Harold Goodman ==
On October 22, 2007, St. George mayor Harold Goodman was arrested for possession of marijuana discovered during the execution of a search warrant at his home. Goodman said that he "used marijuana sparingly when symptoms of Crohn's disease, a chronic inflammation of the gastrointestinal tract, flared up." No information was given at the time for the basis of the search warrant. Goodman took a leave of absence after his arrest.

On October 25, 2007, it was announced that Goodman had been re-arrested, for suspicion of possessing child pornography.
