= Country Life Acres, Missouri =

- Village
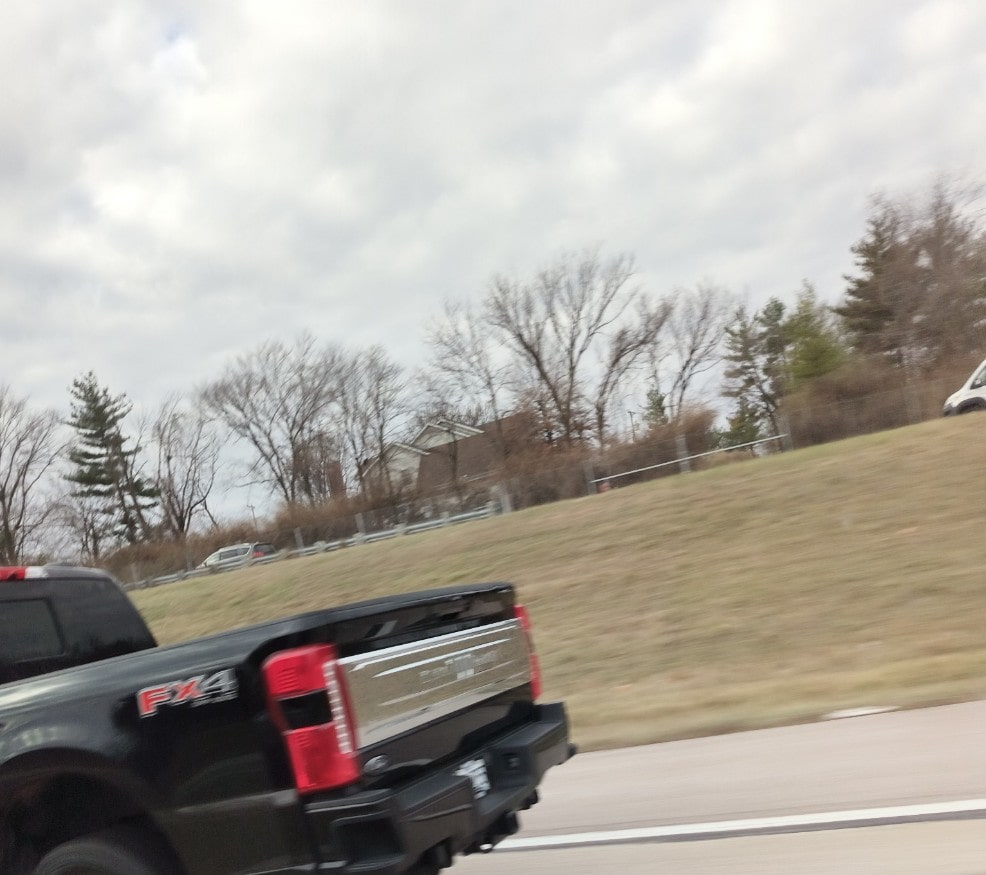
- Country Life Acres in 2025

- Location of Country Life Acres, Missouri
- Coordinates: 38°37′29″N 90°27′19″W
- Country: United States
- State: Missouri
- County: St. Louis
- Township: Missouri River

Area
  - Total: 0.12 sq mi (0.32 km^{2})
  - Land: 0.12 sq mi (0.32 km^{2})
  - Water: 0 sq mi (0.00 km^{2})
- Elevation: 650 ft (200 m)

Population (2020)
  - Total: 72
  - Density: 580.1/sq mi (223.99/km^{2})
- Time zone: UTC-6 (Central (CST))
  - Summer (DST): UTC-5 (CDT)
- FIPS code: 29-16876
- GNIS feature ID: 2398637

Country Life Acres is a village in Missouri River Township, St. Louis County, Missouri, United States. The population was 72 at the 2020 census.

The village is considered the richest incorporated community in the state of Missouri ranked by mean household income as of 2020. It is a gated neighborhood surrounded by Town and Country, Missouri.

== Geography ==
According to the United States Census Bureau, the village has a total area of 0.11 square miles (0.28 km^{2}), all land.

== Demographics ==
Historical population
Census	Pop.	Note	%±
1950	57		—
1960	66		15.8%
1970	60		−9.1%
1980	77		28.3%
1990	101		31.2%
2000	81		−19.8%
2010	74		−8.6%
2020	72		−2.7%
U.S. Decennial Census

=== 2020 census ===
Country Life Acres village, Missouri – Racial and ethnic composition Note: the US Census treats Hispanic/Latino as an ethnic category. This table excludes Latinos from the racial categories and assigns them to a separate category. Hispanics/Latinos may be of any race.
Race / Ethnicity (NH = Non-Hispanic)	Pop 2000	Pop 2010	Pop 2020	% 2000	% 2010	% 2020
White alone (NH)	70	70	67	86.42%	94.59%	93.06%
Black or African American alone (NH)	1	0	0	1.23%	0.00%	0.00%
Native American or Alaska Native alone (NH)	0	0	1	0.00%	0.00%	1.39%
Asian alone (NH)	4	3	0	4.94%	4.05%	0.00%
Native Hawaiian or Pacific Islander alone (NH)	0	0	1	0.00%	0.00%	1.39%
Other race alone (NH)	0	0	1	0.00%	0.00%	1.39%
Mixed race or Multiracial (NH)	0	0	1	0.00%	0.00%	1.39%
Hispanic or Latino (any race)	6	1	1	7.41%	1.35%	1.39%
Total	81	74	72	100.00%	100.00%	100.00%

=== 2010 census ===
At the 2010 census there were 74 people, 27 households, and 24 families living in the village. The population density was 672.7 inhabitants per square mile (259.7/km^{2}). There were 28 housing units at an average density of 254.5 per square mile (98.3/km^{2}). The racial makeup of the village was 95.9% White and 4.1% Asian. Hispanic or Latino of any race were 1.4%.

Of the 27 households 22.2% had children under the age of 18 living with them, 81.5% were married couples living together, 3.7% had a female householder with no husband present, 3.7% had a male householder with no wife present, and 11.1% were non-families. 11.1% of households were one person and 7.4% were one person aged 65 or older. The average household size was 2.74 and the average family size was 2.96.

The median age in the village was 49 years. 20.3% of residents were under the age of 18; 6.9% were between the ages of 18 and 24; 12.2% were from 25 to 44; 33.8% were from 45 to 64; and 27% were 65 or older. The gender makeup of the village was 47.3% male and 52.7% female.

=== 2000 census ===
At the 2000 census there were 81 people, 27 households, and 22 families living in the village. The population density was 725.5 inhabitants per square mile (280.1/km^{2}). There were 27 housing units at an average density of 241.8 per square mile (93.4/km^{2}). The racial makeup of the village was 93.83% White, 1.23% African American and 4.94% Asian. Hispanic or Latino of any race were 7.41%.

Of the 27 households 40.7% had children under the age of 18 living with them, 77.8% were married couples living together, 3.7% had a female householder with no husband present, and 18.5% were non-families. 14.8% of households were one person and 14.8% were one person aged 65 or older. The average household size was 3.00 and the average family size was 3.36.

The age distribution was 23.5% under the age of 18, 9.9% from 18 to 24, 14.8% from 25 to 44, 40.7% from 45 to 64, and 11.1% 65 or older. The median age was 47 years. For every 100 females, there were 92.9 males. For every 100 females age 18 and over, there were 93.8 males.

The median household income was $193,271 and the median family income was $200,000. Males had a median income of $100,000 versus $60,833 for females. The per capita income for the village was $100,617. There were no families and 3.3% of the population living below the poverty line, including no under eighteens and none of those over 64.

== Education ==
The village is part of the Parkway School District.
