= Shrewsbury, Missouri =

City in St. Louis County, Missouri, United States

- City
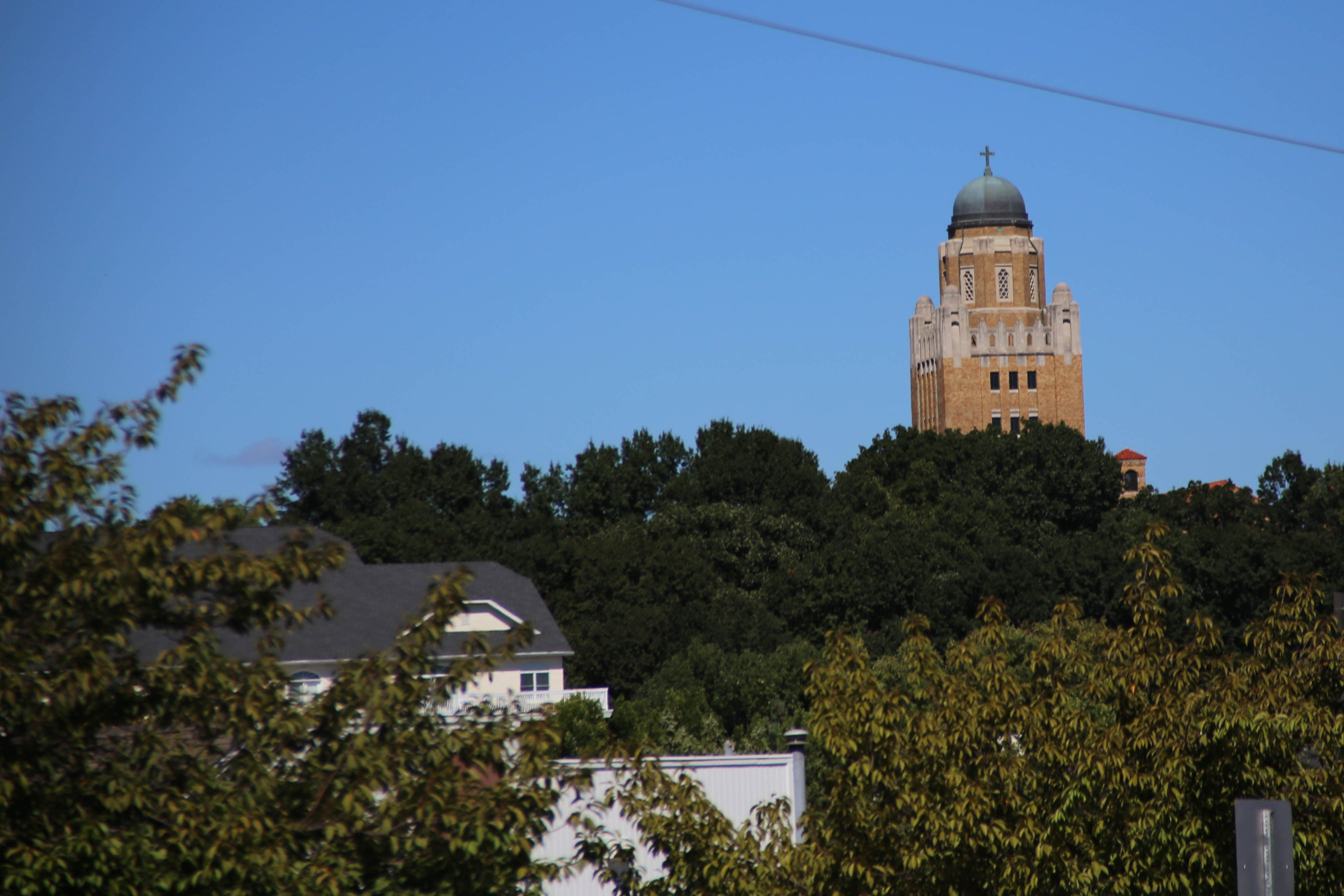

- Location of Shrewsbury, Missouri
- Coordinates: 38°35′12″N 90°19′41″W
- Country: United States
- State: Missouri
- County: St. Louis

Area
  - Total: 1.44 sq mi (3.73 km^{2})
  - Land: 1.44 sq mi (3.73 km^{2})
  - Water: 0 sq mi (0.00 km^{2})
- Elevation: 522 ft (159 m)

Population (2020)
  - Total: 6,406
  - Density: 4,444.7/sq mi (1,716.09/km^{2})
- Time zone: UTC-6 (Central (CST))
  - Summer (DST): UTC-5 (CDT)
- FIPS code: 29-67700
- GNIS feature ID: 2395878
- Website: www.shrewsburymo.gov

Shrewsbury is an inner-ring suburb of St. Louis in St. Louis County, Missouri, United States. As of the 2020 census, Shrewsbury had a population of 6,406.

== History ==
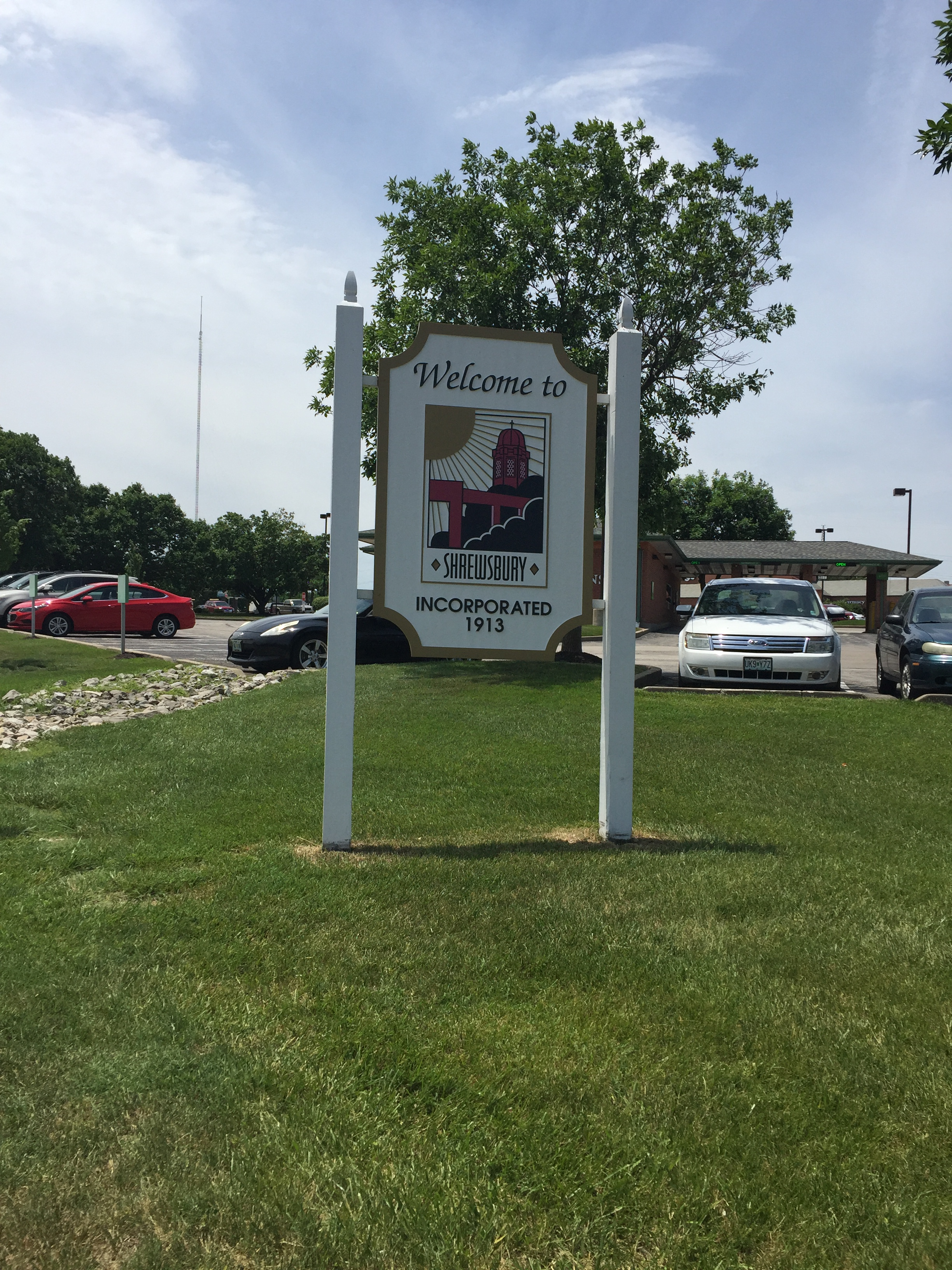
Shrewsbury welcome sign, 2018

Shrewsbury was officially platted in 1889. The land which became Shrewsbury originally belonged to Gregorie Sarpy and Charles Gratiot Sr. The area now known as Shrewsbury was a 278-acre (1.13 km^{2}) farm owned by General John Murdoch. The Murdoch farm was called Shrewsbury Park, named after a town in England. In 1890, the Shrewsbury Station on the Frisco Railroad was dedicated, and the land was divided into farms and sold to families.

In 1913, concerned resident Joseph Burge organized the Shrewsbury Improvement Association to improve Shrewsbury and develop its first sewer system. Shrewsbury was incorporated and became a village in 1913; shortly thereafter a sanitation system was established, reducing water-borne diseases prevalent at the time.

In 1938, the United States government offered financial aid to the city of Shrewsbury, and land was acquired for the construction of a new city hall replacing the 1912 original. The new City Hall building was completed in October 1938. Shrewsbury's new fire engine house and state-of-the-art equipment were dedicated in 1947; it was during this period that the Shrewsbury Garden Club was formed to maintain the beautiful trees and flowers throughout the city. The early 1950s were marked by the expansion of the public bus routes to connect Shrewsbury to St. Louis. The 1960s and '70s were times of great community growth, noted by the construction of city parks, a municipal pool, and Interstate 44.

The 1980s and '90s saw increased development of new homes, condominiums, apartments, shopping areas, and a new and improved City Center, which opened May 8, 1993, to coincide with Shrewsbury's 80th year of incorporation. With the opening of the City Center, the previous City Hall building was converted to house the police and fire departments, and is now called the Public Safety Building.

Construction finished in 2006 on the Shrewsbury–Lansdowne Interstate 44 St. Louis MetroLink station on the eastern edge of the city, at Lansdowne Avenue and River Des Peres Boulevard.

Shrewsbury is home to the seminary of the Roman Catholic Archdiocese of Saint Louis, Kenrick–Glennon Seminary.

The Shrewsbury City Council in fall 2010 was expected to consider a plan to turn Kenrick Plaza, which has several open storefronts, into a Walmart store.

== Geography ==
According to the United States Census Bureau, the city has a total area of 1.43 square miles (3.70 km^{2}), all land.

The city is roughly bounded by St. Louis to the east, Webster Groves to the north, Marlborough to the west and Mackenzie and Affton to the south.

Children in Shrewsbury attend Webster Groves and Affton school districts.

== Demographics ==
=== 2020 census ===
As of the 2020 census, Shrewsbury had a population of 6,406. The median age was 44.4 years. 15.3% of residents were under the age of 18 and 27.6% of residents were 65 years of age or older. For every 100 females there were 84.1 males, and for every 100 females age 18 and over there were 80.4 males age 18 and over.

100.0% of residents lived in urban areas, while 0.0% lived in rural areas.

There were 3,274 households in Shrewsbury, of which 17.3% had children under the age of 18 living in them. Of all households, 32.9% were married-couple households, 21.1% were households with a male householder and no spouse or partner present, and 40.4% were households with a female householder and no spouse or partner present. About 48.8% of all households were made up of individuals and 26.1% had someone living alone who was 65 years of age or older.

There were 3,478 housing units, of which 5.9% were vacant. The homeowner vacancy rate was 1.5% and the rental vacancy rate was 7.5%.

Racial composition as of the 2020 census
Race	Number	Percent
White	5,459	85.2%
Black or African American	325	5.1%
American Indian and Alaska Native	27	0.4%
Asian	195	3.0%
Native Hawaiian and Other Pacific Islander	0	0.0%
Some other race	70	1.1%
Two or more races	330	5.2%
Hispanic or Latino (of any race)	204	3.2%

Shrewsbury city, Missouri – Racial and ethnic composition Note: the US Census treats Hispanic/Latino as an ethnic category. This table excludes Latinos from the racial categories and assigns them to a separate category. Hispanics/Latinos may be of any race.
Race / Ethnicity (NH = Non-Hispanic)	Pop 2000	Pop 2010	Pop 2020	% 2000	% 2010	% 2020
White alone (NH)	6,182	5,546	5,410	93.05%	88.68%	84.45%
Black or African American alone (NH)	98	222	325	1.48%	3.55%	5.07%
Native American or Alaska Native alone (NH)	10	10	15	0.15%	0.16%	0.23%
Asian alone (NH)	175	243	195	2.63%	3.89%	3.04%
Native Hawaiian or Pacific Islander alone (NH)	1	1	0	0.02%	0.02%	0.00%
Other race alone (NH)	2	7	24	0.03%	0.11%	0.37%
Mixed race or Multiracial (NH)	64	79	233	0.96%	1.26%	3.64%
Hispanic or Latino (any race)	112	146	204	1.69%	2.33%	3.18%
Total	6,644	6,254	6,406	100.00%	100.00%	100.00%

Historical population
Census	Pop.	Note	%±
1920	845		—
1930	1,525		80.5%
1940	2,182		43.1%
1950	3,382		55.0%
1960	4,730		39.9%
1970	5,896		24.7%
1980	5,077		−13.9%
1990	6,416		26.4%
2000	6,644		3.6%
2010	6,254		−5.9%
2020	6,406		2.4%
U.S. Decennial Census

=== 2010 census ===
As of the 2010 census, there were 6,254 people, 3,218 households, and 1,331 families living in the city. The population density was 4,373.4 inhabitants per square mile (1,688.6/km^{2}). There were 3,487 housing units at an average density of 2,438.5 per square mile (941.5/km^{2}). The racial makeup of the city was 90.4% White, 3.6% African American, 0.2% Native American, 3.9% Asian, 0.5% from other races, and 1.4% from two or more races. Hispanic or Latino of any race were 2.3% of the population.

There were 3,218 households, of which 16.3% had children under the age of 18 living with them, 32.3% were married couples living together, 7.1% had a female householder with no husband present, 2.1% had a male householder with no wife present, and 58.6% were non-families. 50.0% of all households were made up of individuals, and 23.3% had someone living alone who was 65 years of age or older. The average household size was 1.84 and the average family size was 2.76.

The median age in the city was 42.9 years. 14.2% of residents were under the age of 18; 10.4% were between the ages of 18 and 24; 27.6% were from 25 to 44; 23.5% were from 45 to 64; and 24.2% were 65 years of age or older. The gender makeup of the city was 45.3% male and 54.7% female.

=== 2000 census ===
As of the 2000 census, there were 6,644 people, 3,266 households, and 1,407 families living in the city. The population density was 4,655.4 inhabitants per square mile (1,797.5/km^{2}). There were 3,390 housing units at an average density of 2,375.4 per square mile (917.1/km^{2}). The racial makeup of the city was 93.98% White, 1.48% African American, 0.18% Native American, 2.63% Asian, 0.02% Pacific Islander, 0.54% from other races, and 1.17% from two or more races. Hispanic or Latino of any race were 1.69% of the population.

There were 3,266 households, out of which 17.3% had children under the age of 18 living with them, 34.0% were married couples living together, 7.5% had a female householder with no husband present, and 56.9% were non-families. 47.5% of all households were made up of individuals, and 22.5% had someone living alone who was 65 years of age or older. The average household size was 1.91 and the average family size was 2.80.

In the city, the population was spread out, with 15.6% under the age of 18, 10.8% from 18 to 24, 29.8% from 25 to 44, 17.4% from 45 to 64, and 26.3% who were 65 years of age or older. The median age was 40 years. For every 100 females, there were 78.9 males. For every 100 females age 18 and over, there were 74.2 males.

The median income for a household in the city was $40,896, and the median income for a family was $57,007. Males had a median income of $40,951 versus $35,018 for females. The per capita income for the city was $27,479. About 3.1% of families and 8.7% of the population were below the poverty line, including 3.8% of those under age 18 and 5.2% of those age 65 or over.

== Transportation ==
=== Major roads and highways ===
Major arterial routes in Shrewsbury include Big Bend Boulevard, Laclede Station Road, Lansdowne Avenue, Murdoch Avenue and Watson Road. Interstate 44 passes through the northern part of the city near Deer Creek.

=== Public transportation ===
Shrewsbury is served by the Blue Line of the St. Louis region's MetroLink light rail system. The city has one station, Shrewsbury–Lansdowne I-44, which is located within the city limits of St. Louis in the Lindenwood Park neighborhood despite being named for Shrewsbury. Metro Transit also operates the Shrewsbury Transit Center on Lansdowne Avenue, which connects the light rail station to several MetroBus routes and paratransit services.

== See also ==
- List of cities in Missouri
