= St. Louis County, Missouri =

County in Missouri, United States

- County
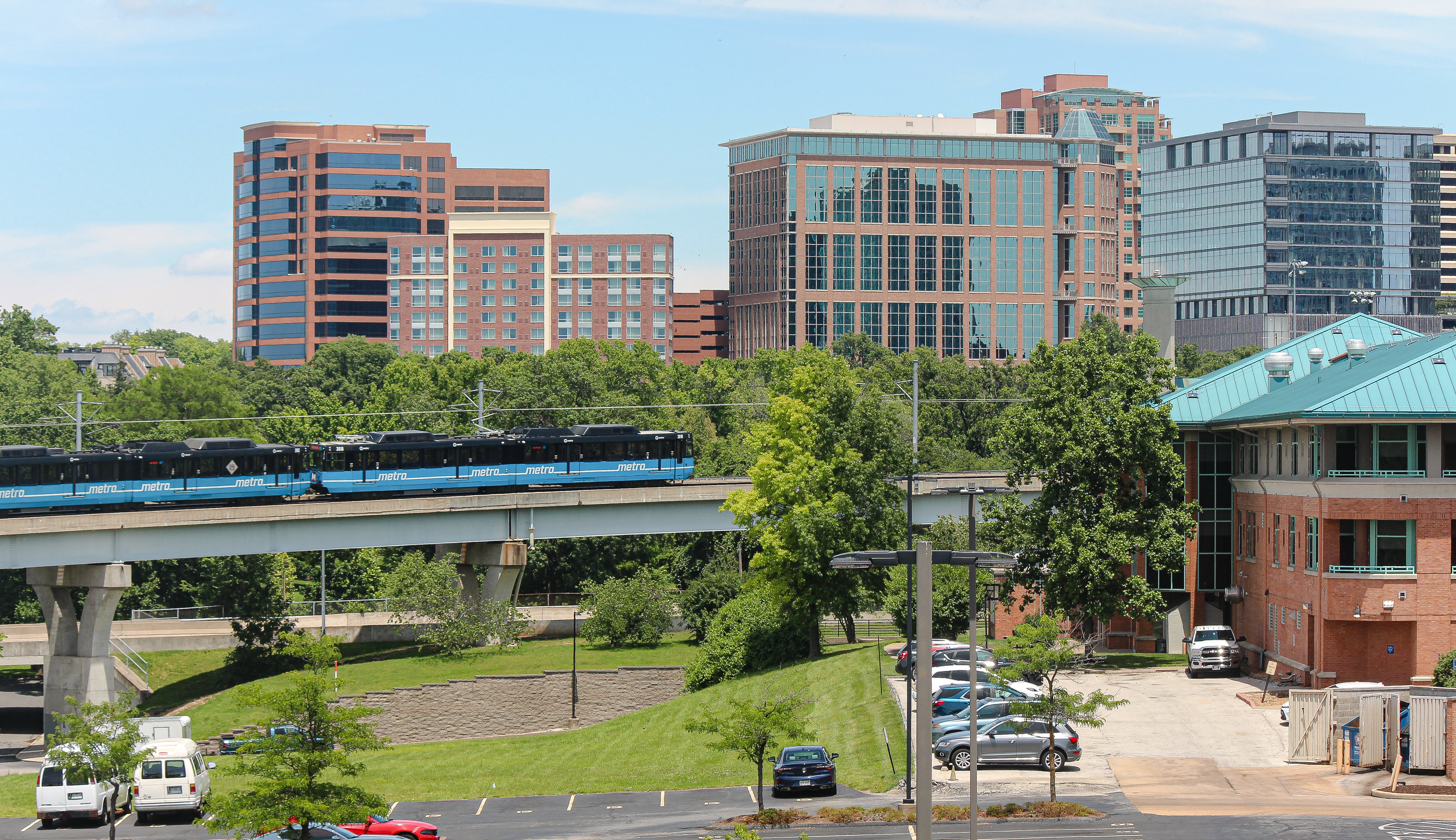
- Clayton, the St. Louis County seat

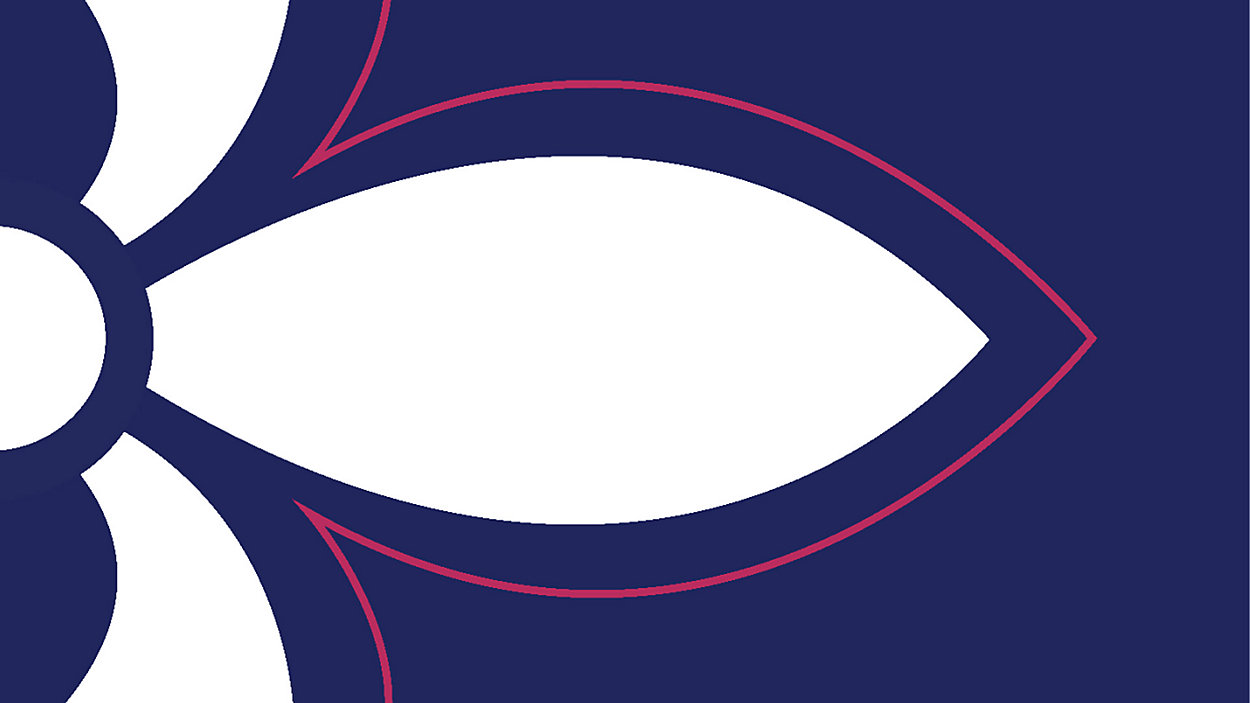
- Flag Seal Logo

- Location within the U.S. state of Missouri
- Coordinates: 38°38′26.477″N 90°26′45.862″W
- Country: United States
- State: Missouri
- Founded: October 1, 1812
- Seat: Clayton
- Largest city: Florissant

Government
  - County executive: Sam Page (D)

Area
  - Total: 523.366 sq mi (1,355.51 km^{2})
  - Land: 507.995 sq mi (1,315.70 km^{2})
  - Water: 15.371 sq mi (39.81 km^{2}) 2.9%

Population (2020)
  - Total: 1,004,125
  - Estimate (2025): 990,911 ▼
  - Density: 1,943.527/sq mi (750.400/km^{2})
- Time zone: UTC−6 (Central)
  - Summer (DST): UTC−5 (CDT)
- Congressional districts: 1st, 2nd
- Website: stlouiscountymo.gov

St. Louis County is located in eastern Missouri. It is bounded by the City of St. Louis and the Mississippi River to the east, the Missouri River to the north, and the Meramec River to the south. As of the 2020 census, the population was 1,004,125, making it the most populous county in Missouri, and was estimated to be 987,059 in 2023. Its county seat is Clayton, while the largest city is Florissant. The county is included in the St. Louis, MO–IL metropolitan statistical area.

After Great Britain took over former French territory east of the Mississippi River, many ethnic French colonists moved west. They settled the area of St. Louis County and founded the city of St. Louis in the late 1700s. The US acquired this territory in 1803 with the Louisiana Purchase.

In 1877 residents of the City of St. Louis voted to separate from the county and become an independent city. In the 1960s, with growing suburban development of Greater St. Louis, the county's population overtook that of the city for the first time. Restructuring of industry resulted in job and population declines in the city, and the county has continued to expand.

Through the decades, changing conditions have led many business and political leaders to propose merging the city and county as a single government. In 2019, efforts to put the issue to a statewide vote failed to get on a ballot.

== History ==
=== Colonial settlement and early government ===
During the 18th century, several European colonial settlements were established in the area that would become St. Louis County. French colonists moved from east of the Mississippi River after France ceded territory to Great Britain after losing the Seven Years' War. It also ceded much of its territory west of the River to Spain.

St. Louis was founded by Pierre Laclède and Auguste Chouteau on February 14, 1764; they became major fur traders in the city. Founded in about 1767 was Carondelet, to the south. It was annexed by the city in 1871. Florissant, then known as St. Ferdinand, was established in 1785 about twelve miles northwest of St. Louis on a tributary of the Missouri River. During the 1790s, the very small settlements known as Creve Coeur and Point Labadie were built north and west of St. Louis.

Upon the sale and transfer of French Louisiana to the United States on October 1, 1804, President Thomas Jefferson suggested the territory retain the districts drawn by Spanish officials during their decades-long rule of the territory after an arrangement with the French. During this time, the first governing body of St. Louis County was established (following the earlier Spanish governors).

This government, called the Court of Quarter Sessions, was composed of Charles Gratiot, Auguste Chouteau, Jacques Clamorgan, and David DeLaunay, all ethnic French or French Canadians; the court held judicial, executive, and legislative power. On October 1, 1812, the District of St. Louis was renamed St. Louis County (exactly eight years after its establishment) during a federal reorganization of the Louisiana Territory's status.

=== Antebellum growth and early education ===
After the transfer of Louisiana to the United States, the authority to grant incorporation to municipalities was delegated to the Territory and later was a state power. The first to gain municipal status in St. Louis County was St. Louis, which incorporated on November 9, 1809, under the territorial legislature. It gained city status on December 9, 1822. Only a handful of other municipal incorporations took place prior to the separation of the county and city: St. Ferdinand was granted incorporation in 1829 (and reincorporated as Florissant in 1843), while Bridgeton, a settlement along the Missouri River near Florissant, gained incorporation in 1843.

The towns of Pacific and Kirkwood grew substantially and incorporated in the 1850s, with their growth stimulated by construction of the Pacific Railroad (later the Missouri Pacific Railroad). Pacific, a community along the Meramec River first known as Franklin, straddles St. Louis and Franklin counties; it incorporated as Pacific in 1859. Kirkwood was settled in 1853 after Hiram Leffingwell and Richard Elliott platted and auctioned land along the railroad line; they named their settlement after James P. Kirkwood, who had planned the route of the railroad through the area. Leffingwell organized the town as a planned suburb (the first west of the Mississippi). Kirkwood was granted incorporation by the state in 1865.

Other areas of the county began to be settled during this period but did not incorporate as towns. Among these were Chesterfield, which was settled in the 1820s in west St. Louis County. Gravois and Affton were settled in south St. Louis County in the 1850s and 1860s.

The first St. Louis Public Schools were established in the major city in the 1830s. It was a decade and more before some of the settlements of St. Louis County began providing public education. In 1854, the School District of Maplewood was established. It included all of today's Maplewood district, part of what became Webster Groves, Missouri, along the south and southwest, a large part of St. Louis in the east, and to the north up to Clayton Road. The first school, originally called the Washington Institute and later renamed as Maplewood High School, opened as a one-room stone building at the crossing of Manchester Road over the Missouri Pacific Railroad tracks. Another antebellum school district was Rock Hill, which provided a one-room school across from the Rock Hill Presbyterian Church until about 1870.

The first school in Florissant opened in 1819 under the direction of the Religious of the Sacred Heart, a Roman Catholic religious congregation. The instructor, Rose Philippine Duchesne, was a French immigrant who has been described as "one of the foremost educators in the state of Missouri". A second school, initially an Indian school known as the St. Regis Academy, was operated for young boys from 1823 to 1829. The complex included the Jesuit St. Stanislaus Seminary, which continued to operate until 1971. The earliest public school in Florissant was the St. Ferdinand School, which was authorized by the General Assembly in 1845 and operated until 1871 when the Florissant School District was formed.

=== Government changes and early courthouses ===
From 1813 to 1830, the county initiated several changes to its government. By an act of the territorial legislature, the Court of Quarter Sessions was succeeded by a panel of three judges of common pleas in 1813. Two years later, this panel was succeeded by a newly created county court in 1815, composed of justices of the peace elected from the county to three-month terms. The St. Louis County Circuit Court (established in 1815 as the judicial branch of the county) was given authority in 1816 over the executive and legislative affairs of the county, superseding the court of justices of the peace.

In 1821, a hybrid County and Probate Court was established and given executive and legislative control, and in 1830, its probate functions ceased. This County Court operated as the government of St. Louis County until public scandals encouraged the state legislature to abolish it and replace it in 1859 with a Board of Commissioners.

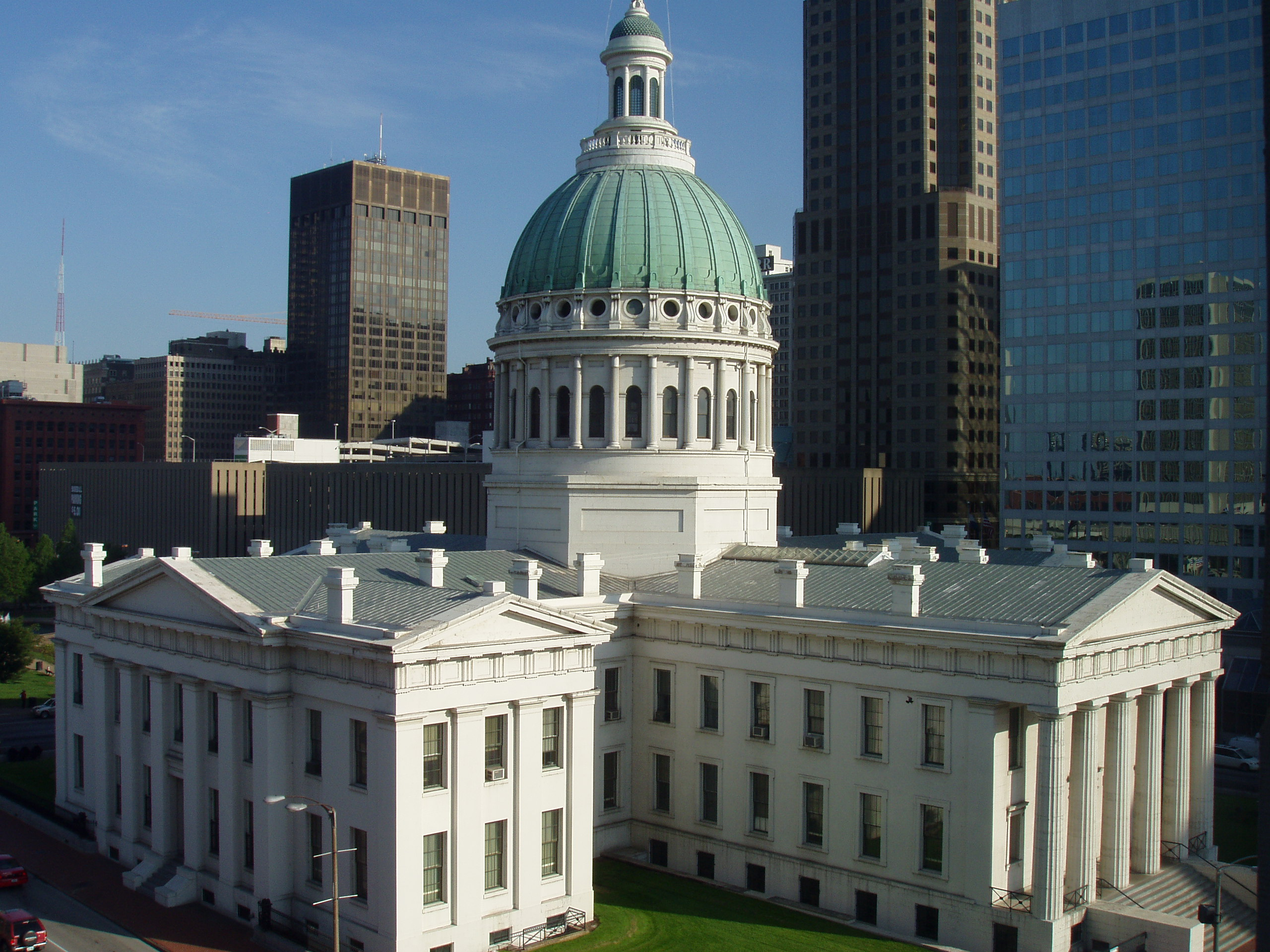
The Old Courthouse was built in downtown St. Louis from 1839 to 1856 as the second purpose-built county courthouse for St. Louis County.

Sessions of the County Court and other county governing bodies were held in a variety of locations during this early period. The Court of Quarter Sessions held its first meeting in 1804 at a tavern in St. Louis, then regularly at a building at Third and Plum until 1817. The county seat moved that year to a newly built one-story log cabin on Third Street between Elm and Spruce, followed by a move to the brick Baptist Church at Third and Market in 1820.

The County Court established a commission in 1822 to study a permanent courthouse (previous facilities were rented). In 1823, Auguste Chouteau and John Baptiste Charles Lucas donated two tracts of land that formed a vacant square bounded by Broadway, Fourth, Chestnut, and Market.

Between the summer of 1826 and 1833, a low-roofed two-story brick structure was built fronting Fourth Street; this was the first permanent courthouse for St. Louis County. Within a few years, however, the building's size was inadequate for the county government's needs; the original building was left in place during construction on the new building, which began in 1839. This new courthouse, now known as the Old Courthouse, included a finished rotunda, dome, and west wing by 1843; the 1833 courthouse was demolished in 1851, and by 1856, the east wing of the new courthouse was complete.

=== Separation of St. Louis and St. Louis County ===
During the antebellum period, some city leaders began to work to separate the city of St. Louis, the county's largest municipality, from the county. In 1843, a group of St. Louis city residents petitioned the state legislature to separate the two entities. The General Assembly passed a resolution calling for a referendum on the subject among county voters outside the city. This vote held on August 7, 1844, showed a majority of county voters opposed to separation.

Despite the vote, controversy continued and tension mounted between the county government and the city government during the 1840s and 1850s. Much of the dispute involved the double taxation of city residents and their proportionally lesser representation in county government. The reform of 1859, in which the County Court was abolished by the state government and replaced by a Board of Commissioners, was in large part a reaction to city outcry over mismanagement of tax money. More than a name change, the reform expanded the size of the county government council to seven members, with four seats reserved for city representation (but the city at that time had roughly ten times the population of the county, so was still underrepresented in county government). The reform temporarily ameliorated the tensions. In 1863, the General Assembly restored the name of the county government to its former name of County Court.

Despite some reforms, controversy returned and grew during the 1860s. This was largely due to what city residents considered double taxation: by the county and the city for services effectively provided by the city alone. Several plans began to circulate during the late 1860s that would relieve this burden, including home rule status for St. Louis, further reorganization of the County Court to ensure greater representation, city-county government consolidation, and separation of the two entities. The General Assembly considered several plans during this period. In March 1871, it passed a further reorganization of the County Court; the new Court would have an presiding judge elected at-large, four seats reserved to be elected by city residents, and two seats for county residents. This reform, however, pleased virtually no one pushing for reform, and it made little practical difference in the operation of the county government.

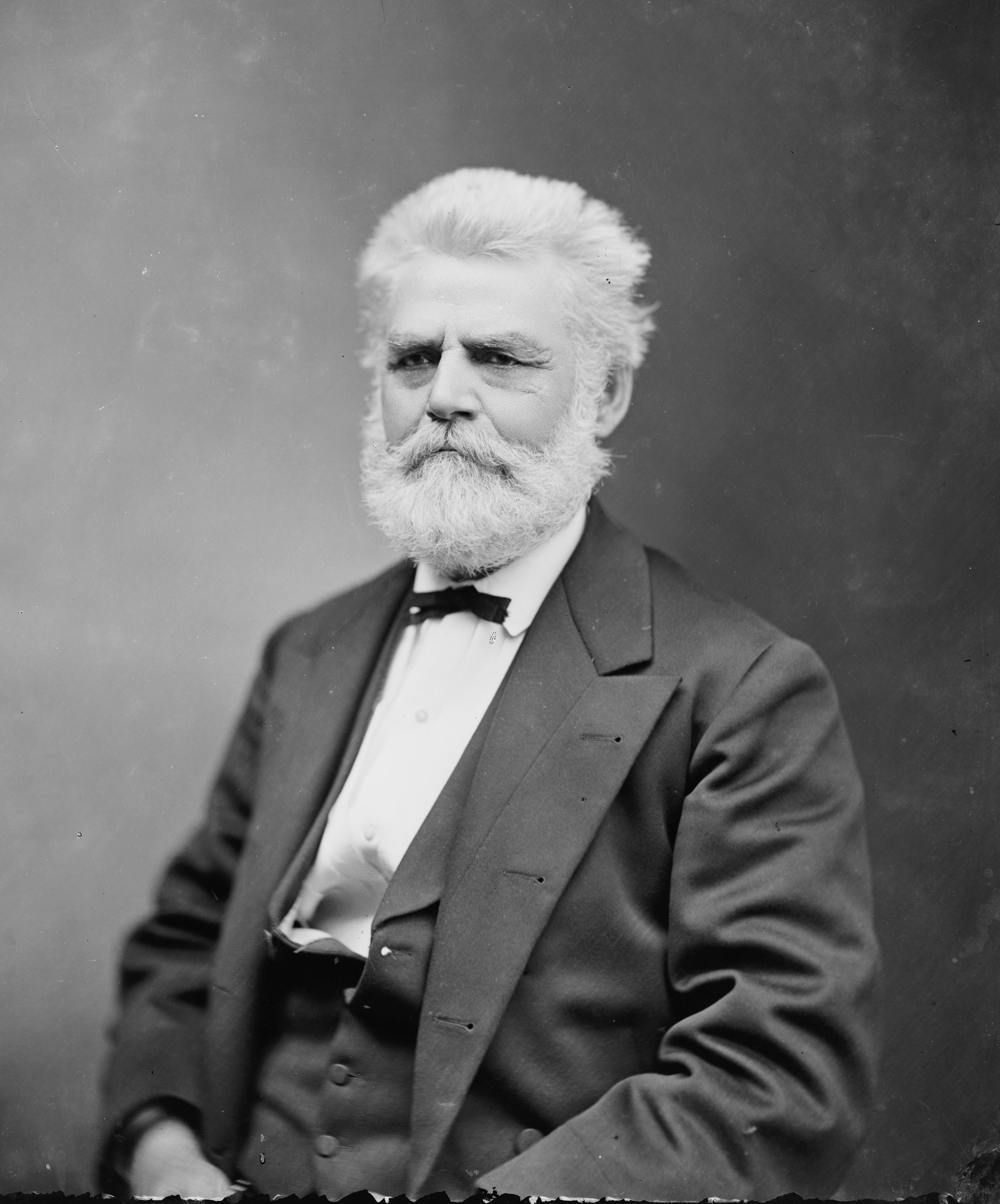
Local politician David H. Armstrong was a strong supporter of the separation of the city of St. Louis from St. Louis County.

A consolidation plan proceeded in the General Assembly in 1871, backed by city political leaders Anthony Ittner and Roderick E. Rombauer. The Missouri Republican newspaper strongly backed the approach, while the Missouri Democrat argued it would lead city leaders into corruption. The latter pressed for a separation plan, support for which was led by David H. Armstrong. The separation plan gained greater support when it became clear that the mistrust between city and county residents precluded consolidation. A citizen group known as the Taxpayers League formed in 1872 to advance the separation cause. City leaders looked to Baltimore, Maryland, which had separated from Baltimore County in 1853, as an example.

The mechanism by which separation took place began in 1875 at the state constitutional convention. At the convention, a committee examined the issues of the St. Louis government, and it summarized the two options facing the region as consolidation and separation. The full convention voted to include a provision in the constitution allowing for separation; the vote was 53 in favor, 4 opposed, 11 absent. Only one member of the St. Louis delegation opposed separation:

I am in favor of total consolidation of St. Louis County, but I am not in favor of dividing it, splitting and hacking it in this manner...I vote no.

— Nicolas A. Mortell, Cohn, 29.

In 1877, the City of St. Louis separated from the county, creating an independent city. The city in August 1876 narrowly approved the separation while county residents overwhelmingly opposed the separation. City residents had argued they wanted to be "rid of county taxes and state influence over county government". At the time the city had 350,000 residents while the rural county had 30,000. The rural county also had only 150 miles of gravel roads. Although the results were challenged in the courts, the two jurisdictions were formally separated in March 1877.

=== Postseparation political issues ===
The first meeting of the new County Court took place on January 22, 1877, at the home of James C. Sutton, in what is now Maplewood. The three judges appointed a new county clerk, sheriff, and treasurer. They also announced at that meeting that the new Court was functional (obviating the legal standing of the previous County Court, which continued to meet albeit without legal function until July 1877) and the transfer of all county buildings and property in the city of St. Louis to the city government. Thus the county's courthouse in St. Louis became city property. The Court also requested that the city of St. Louis continue to provide police protection to some areas of the county until the county could provide these services.

On January 29, 1877, the Court considered a report that recommended Kirkwood as the new county seat, but did not decide the issue at that time. The Court continued to meet at the Sutton House in Maplewood until February 1877, when it convened at the Des Peres Grange Hall. It agreed then to rent space at the Mount Olive Hotel, in what is now University City, until deciding on a new location for the courthouse. The Court continued to meet at the Mount Olive Hotel from March 1877 to 1879. Throughout 1877, the Court debated the question of the county seat; rejecting several sites, including Kirkwood and Florissant.

In September 1877 the Court accepted the donation of 100 acres of land on Hanley Road by a farmer named Ralph Clayton. In addition to the benefit of donated land, the site was chosen because it was on the route of the Hodiamont streetcar line, which connected from St. Louis to Florissant. An additional four acres were given by M. F. Hanley, and in May 1878, the cornerstone was laid for a new county courthouse. In October 1878 the courthouse donation and streets were platted in what would become the town of Clayton. The new courthouse and jail opened in December 1878, at a cost of $38,000. Two additions were made to the courthouse in 1912 and in 1926.

=== Growth of education and municipalities ===
In the years from the Civil War to World War I, relatively few new towns incorporated in St. Louis County; the first to incorporate after the war, Fenton, was incorporated in 1874 in southwest St. Louis County. Webster Groves incorporated in 1896, prompted by residents' demands for a police department after the murder of Bertram Atwater, a commercial artist from Chicago. Webster had earlier been settled in 1853 as a stop on the Missouri Pacific line.

Other incorporations before World War I included University City in 1906 near Washington University in St. Louis; Maplewood in 1908, also along the Missouri Pacific railroad line; Wellston in 1908 in the inner north county; Shrewsbury in 1913 east of Webster Groves; Clayton in 1913 south of University City; and Richmond Heights in 1913 south of Clayton. State law required only that 50% of residents agree to incorporation via a petition for a legal incorporation to take place; the county government had no ability to restrict the incorporation if the 50% threshold were met. Significant suburban growth in the early 20th century stimulated a rapid increase in the number of incorporations after 1935.

After the Civil War, dozens of school districts opened in St. Louis County to provide basic primary education. In Eureka, along the Missouri Pacific line to Pacific, a one-room log school opened in the town in 1870, which expanded to two stories and four rooms in about 1900. In the towns of Old Orchard and Webster Groves along the Missouri Pacific line, schools opened in 1867 and 1868, respectively. In Kirkwood, private schools began operating within a few years of the first settlers purchasing lots in 1853; in the early 1860s, these included the Kirkwood Seminary (which closed in 1889), the Kirkwood Military Academy, St. Peter Catholic School, and Concordia Lutheran School. The first public schools in Kirkwood opened in 1866 as part of the newly formed Kirkwood School District; the district provided two years of high school from 1873 and opened a four-year Kirkwood High School in 1896.

In some areas, formerly private schools became part of new public districts. In Florissant, the St. Ferdinand School (opened in 1845) became part of the Florissant School District in 1871, although it continued to be staffed by nuns. The first public school in the newly formed district opened in 1876 near St. Ferdinand and Washington Streets. In Ballwin, a school opened in 1855 by German Methodists was bought by a newly formed Ballwin School District in 1869. The one-room schoolhouse operated until 1900 when a two-room building opened as a replacement.

=== Postwar ===
A new courthouse was built in Clayton in 1945 (it serves as the 21st-century County Police headquarters). The original 1878 courthouse was torn down in 1971 to be replaced by county government plaza and modern six-story courthouse.

Several changes took place in St. Louis County education after World War II. The Florissant School District and the Ferguson School District merged in October 1951 to form the Ferguson-Florissant School District. As part of a court-ordered desegregation plan, in 1975 the Ferguson-Florissant district annexed the Kinloch and the Berkeley school districts to combine the schools.

In 1955, St. Louis County established the St. Louis County Police Department, with jurisdiction throughout the county. In 1977, St. Louis County was terrorized by three car bombings, which killed two people. The bomber was never caught.

In 1988 the Board of Freeholders proposed consolidating the county's 89 municipalities into 37 cities, eliminating all unincorporated areas. The vote in June 1989 was challenged by numerous groups on grounds questioning the board's constitutional authority. On June 25, days after the scheduled vote would have occurred, the U.S. Supreme Court unanimously overturned the Missouri Supreme Court, arguing the board's land ownership requirement violated the U.S. Constitution's Equal Protection Clause.

The county passed the city in population in the 1970 census when it had 951,353 compared to the city's 622,236. Industrial restructuring cost the city many jobs and residents. By the 2010 census, the city had fewer people than in the 19th century.

== Geography ==
According to the United States Census Bureau, the county has a total area of 523.366 square miles (1,355.51 km^{2}), of which 507.995 square miles (1,315.70 km^{2}) is land and 15.371 square miles (39.81 km^{2}) (2.9%) is water.

Colloquially, St. Louis County is often divided into Mid, North, West, and South sections. North County lies north of Interstate 70, West County lies west of Interstate 270, South County lies south of Interstate 44 and Mid County lies in the middle of the three main bordering highways (I-70, I-270 & I-44) and the St. Louis county-city line.

=== Natural boundaries ===
The Missouri River forms the northern border with St. Charles County, exclusive of a few areas where the river has changed its course. The Meramec River forms most of its southern border with Jefferson County. To the east is the City of St. Louis and the Mississippi River. The western boundary with Franklin County is the north–south line where the distance between the Meramec and Missouri rivers is the shortest, bisecting the city of Pacific, roughly two blocks east of Hwy OO/F (First street).

=== Topography ===
The foothills of the Ozark Mountains begin in southwestern St. Louis County, with most of the rest of the county being a fairly level plateau. This western part of the county is the least developed, due to rugged topography. Bluffs along the Mississippi in the south of the county rise about 200–300 feet above the river. A major floodplain area is the Chesterfield Valley, in the western part of the county, along the Missouri River. It was formerly called "Gumbo Flats" after its rich, dark soil; it was submerged by at least ten feet of water during the Great Flood of 1993. The Corps of Engineers constructed a higher levee, and the county has permitted construction in the floodplain.

The Columbia Bottom is a floodplain in the northeast of the county at the confluence of the Mississippi and Missouri rivers; this is preserved as a conservation area open to the public. The Missouri Bottom area between the two other floodplains had been developed for agriculture, but it is being increasingly developed for residential, business, and industry. The River des Peres drains the interior of the county before flowing into constructed underground channels into the City of St. Louis. It was allowed to resurface, where it forms the boundary between southern portions of St. Louis City and St. Louis County. Other streams include Coldwater Creek, Bonhomme Creek, and Creve Coeur Creek, flowing into the Missouri River; Keifer Creek, Fishpot Creek, and Grand Glaize Creek, flowing into the Meramec River; Deer Creek and Gravois Creek, flowing into the River des Peres; and Maline Creek, flowing into the Mississippi River. The highest elevation is 904 feet (276 meters).

=== Geology ===
The bedrock is mainly limestone and dolomite, and much of the county near the rivers is karst terrain, with numerous caves, sinkholes, and springs. No igneous or metamorphic rock is exposed on the surface. A major outcropping of the St. Peter Sandstone formation, a fine white sandstone used for making clear glass, is mined in the southwest corner of the county in Pacific. Brick clay mining was once a major industry in the county. The Charbonier Bluff along the Missouri River is an outcropping of coal and was used a fueling station for steamboats. The "St. Louis Anticline", an underground formation, has small petroleum deposits in the north part of the county.

=== Flora and fauna ===
Before European settlement, the area was prairie and open parklike forest, maintained by Native Americans via burning. Trees are mainly oak, maple, and hickory, similar to the forests of the Ozarks; common understory trees include eastern redbud, serviceberry, and flowering dogwood. Riparian areas are heavily forested with mainly American sycamore. By the 1920s most of the timber in the county was harvested. Since that time, large parks and undeveloped areas in the western and southern parts of the county have grown dense forest cover. Old pastures are usually colonized with eastern red cedar. Most of the residential area of the county is planted with large native shade trees. In autumn, the changing color of the trees is notable. St. Louis County has the most recorded native species of plants in the state, but this is probably due to the intensive botanical research done in the area. Most species here are typical of the Eastern Woodland, but some southern species are found in swampland, and typical northern species survive in sheltered hollows. Invasive species, most notably Japanese honeysuckle, are common in some homesteads converted to parks; these are actively removed.

Large mammals include growing populations of whitetail deer and coyotes, which are becoming increasingly urbanized. Eastern gray squirrel, cottontail rabbit, and other rodents are abundant, as well as opossum, beaver, muskrat, raccoon, and skunk. Large bird species include wild turkey, Canada goose, mallard duck, various raptors like the turkey vulture and red-tailed hawk, as well as shorebirds, including the great egret and great blue heron. Winter populations of bald eagles are found by the Mississippi River around the Chain of Rocks Bridge. The county is on the Mississippi Flyway, used by migrating birds, and has a large variety of small bird species, common to the eastern U.S. The Eurasian tree sparrow, an introduced species, is limited in North America to the counties surrounding St. Louis.

Frogs are commonly found in the springtime, especially after extensive wet periods. Common species include American toad and species of chorus frogs, commonly called "spring peepers", that are found in nearly every pond. Some years have outbreaks of cicadas or ladybugs. Mosquitos and houseflies are common insect nuisances; because of this, windows are nearly universally fitted with screens, and "screened-in" porches are common in homes of the area. Populations of honeybees have sharply declined in recent years, and numerous species of pollinator insects have filled their ecological niche.

=== Climate ===
St. Louis County

Climate chart (precipitation, max. and min. temperature)
J	F	M	A	M	J	J	A	S	O	N	D
66 4 −8	75 7 −4	85 17 4	204 24 10	108 26 15	128 37 20	47 31 22	113 31 20	97 29 17	90 21 10	46 15 4	81 5 −5
- █ Average max. and min. temperatures in °C
- █ Precipitation totals in mm
Imperial conversion
J	F	M	A	M	J	J	A	S	O	N	D
2.6 39 18	3 45 25	3.3 63 39	8 75 50	4.3 79 59	5 99 68	1.9 88 72	4.4 88 68	3.8 84 63	3.5 70 50	1.8 59 39	3.2 41 23
- █ Average max. and min. temperatures in °F
- █ Precipitation totals in inches

St. Louis County has a mix of a humid subtropical climate and a humid continental climate, with neither large mountains nor large bodies of water to moderate its temperature. The area is affected by both cold Canadian Arctic air, and also hot, humid air from the Gulf of Mexico. The county has four distinct seasons. Spring is the wettest season and produces erratic severe weather ranging from tornadoes to winter storms. Summers are hot, and the humidity can cause the heat index to rise to temperatures above 100 °F (38 °C). Fall is mild, with lower humidity and can produce intermittent bouts of heavy rainfall with the first snow flurries usually forming in late November. Winters are cool to cold with periodic snow and temperatures often below freezing. Winter storm systems, such as Alberta clippers, can bring days of heavy freezing rain, ice pellets, and snowfall.

The average annual temperature for the years 1971–2000, recorded at Lambert–St. Louis International Airport, is 56.3 °F (13.5 °C), and average precipitation is 36 inches (910 mm). The average high temperature in July is 88.4 °F (31.3 °C), and the average low temperature in January is 22.6 °F (−5.2 °C), although these values are often exceeded. Temperatures of 0 °F (−18 °C) or below occur three days per year on average. The highest temperature ever recorded in St. Louis was 115 °F (46 °C), on July 14, 1954, while the lowest temperature on record is −23 °F (−31 °C), on January 29, 1873.

Winter is the driest season, averaging about 6 inches of total precipitation. Springtime (March through May), is typically the wettest season, with under 10.5 inches. Dry spells of one or two weeks' duration are common during the growing seasons.

Thunderstorms can be expected on 40 to 50 days per year. A few of them will be severe with locally destructive winds and large hail, and occasionally accompanied by tornadoes. A period of unseasonably warm weather late in Autumn known as Indian summer is common—roses will still be in bloom as late as November or early December in some years.

=== Other geography ===
The largest natural lake in the county is Creve Coeur Lake. It was originally an oxbow of the nearby Missouri River and is now the centerpiece of a popular county park.

Manchester Road (Route 100) follows an ancient path westward out of St. Louis, following the boundary between the Missouri and Meramec watersheds. It is one of only two routes to leave the county without crossing any rivers (the other being State Highway T).

The Sinks is a karst area in the far northern part of the county, with numerous sinkholes.

== Demographics ==
Historical population
Census	Pop.	Note	%±
1820	10,049		—
1830	14,125		40.6%
1840	35,979		154.7%
1850	104,978		191.8%
1860	190,524		81.5%
1870	351,189		84.3%
1880	31,888		−90.9%
1890	36,307		13.9%
1900	50,040		37.8%
1910	82,417		64.7%
1920	100,737		22.2%
1930	211,593		110.0%
1940	274,230		29.6%
1950	406,349		48.2%
1960	703,532		73.1%
1970	951,353		35.2%
1980	973,896		2.4%
1990	993,529		2.0%
2000	1,016,315		2.3%
2010	998,954		−1.7%
2020	1,004,125		0.5%
2025 (est.)	990,911	▼	−1.3%
Independent City of St. Louis seceded from the County in 1876. Population of the City of St. Louis in 1880 was 350,518. U.S. Decennial Census; 1790–1960 1900–1990; 1990–2000 2010–2020

As of the third quarter of 2024, the median home value in St. Louis County was $288,970.

As of the 2023 American Community Survey, there are 414,739 estimated households in St. Louis County with an average of 2.36 persons per household. The county has a median household income of $81,340. Approximately 9.7% of the county's population lives at or below the poverty line. St. Louis County has an estimated 65.1% employment rate, with 46.9% of the population holding a bachelor's degree or higher and 66.9% holding a high school diploma.

The top five reported ancestries (people were allowed to report up to two ancestries, thus the figures will generally add to more than 100%) were English (88.5%), Spanish (3.0%), Indo-European (4.1%), Asian and Pacific Islander (3.0%), and Other (1.4%).

The median age in the county was 40.6 years.

=== Racial and ethnic composition ===
St. Louis County, Missouri – Racial and ethnic composition Note: the US Census treats Hispanic/Latino as an ethnic category. This table excludes Latinos from the racial categories and assigns them to a separate category. Hispanics/Latinos may be of any race.
Race / Ethnicity (NH = Non-Hispanic)	Pop 1980	Pop 1990	Pop 2000	Pop 2010	Pop 2020	% 1980	% 1990	% 2000	% 2010	% 2020
White alone (NH)	846,000	829,052	772,041	687,984	624,703	86.87%	83.45%	75.96%	68.87%	62.21%
Black or African American alone (NH)	108,984	138,786	192,544	231,801	245,168	11.19%	13.97%	18.95%	23.20%	24.42%
Native American or Alaska Native alone (NH)	1,104	1,358	1,557	1,632	1,474	0.11%	0.14%	0.15%	0.16%	0.15%
Asian alone (NH)	7,916	13,936	22,492	34,466	48,552	0.81%	1.40%	2.21%	3.45%	4.84%
Native Hawaiian or Pacific Islander alone (NH)	x	x	223	273	264	x	x	0.02%	0.03%	0.03%
Other race alone (NH)	1,615	586	1,315	1,187	4,736	0.17%	0.06%	0.13%	0.12%	0.47%
Mixed race or Multiracial (NH)	x	x	11,566	16,587	42,050	x	x	1.14%	1.66%	4.19%
Hispanic or Latino (any race)	8,277	9,811	14,577	25,024	37,178	0.85%	0.99%	1.43%	2.51%	3.70%
Total	973,896	993,529	1,016,315	998,954	1,004,125	100.00%	100.00%	100.00%	100.00%	100.00%

Racial / Ethnic Profile of places in St. Louis County, Missouri (2020 Census)
Following is a table of cities, villages, and census designated places in St. Louis County, Missouri. Data for the United States (with and without Puerto Rico), the state of Missouri, and St. Louis County itself have been included for comparison purposes.
The majority racial/ethnic group is coded per the key below. Communities that extend into an adjacent county or counties are delineated with a ‡ followed by an accompanying explanatory note. The full population of each community has been tabulated including the population in adjacent counties.

Majority minority with no dominant group
Majority White
Majority Black
Majority Hispanic
Majority Asian

Racial and ethnic composition of places in St. Louis County, Missouri (2020 Census) (NH = Non-Hispanic) Note: the US Census treats Hispanic/Latino as an ethnic category. This table excludes Latinos from the racial categories and assigns them to a separate category. Hispanics/Latinos may be of any race.
Place	Designation	Total Population	White alone (NH)	%	Black or African American alone (NH)	%	Native American or Alaska Native alone (NH)	%	Asian alone (NH)	%	Pacific Islander alone (NH)	%	Other race alone (NH)	%	Mixed race or Multiracial (NH)	%	Hispanic or Latino (any race)	%
United States of America (50 states and D.C.)	x	331,449,281	191,697,647	57.84%	39,940,338	12.05%	2,251,699	0.68%	19,618,719	5.92%	622,018	0.19%	1,689,833	0.51%	13,548,983	4.09%	62,080,044	18.73%
United States of America (50 states, D.C., and Puerto Rico)	x	334,735,155	191,722,195	57.28%	39,944,624	11.93%	2,252,011	0.67%	19,621,465	5.86%	622,109	0.19%	1,692,341	0.51%	13,551,323	4.05%	65,329,087	19.52%
Missouri	State	6,154,913	4,663,907	75.78%	692,774	11.26%	23,496	0.38%	132,158	2.15%	9,293	0.15%	22,377	0.36%	307,840	5.00%	303,068	4.92%
St. Louis County	County	1,004,125	624,703	62.21%	245,168	24.42%	1,474	0.15%	48,552	4.84%	264	0.03%	4,736	0.47%	42,050	4.19%	37,178	3.70%
Affton	CDP	20,417	17,362	85.04%	578	2.83%	32	0.16%	725	3.55%	6	0.03%	76	0.37%	946	4.63%	692	3.39%
Ballwin	City	31,103	24,974	80.29%	916	2.95%	45	0.14%	2,730	8.78%	8	0.03%	130	0.42%	1,327	4.27%	973	3.13%
Bella Villa	City	757	647	85.47%	15	1.98%	1	0.13%	18	2.38%	0	0.00%	1	0.13%	35	4.62%	40	5.28%
Bellefontaine Neighbors	City	10,740	1,396	13.00%	8,886	82.74%	27	0.25%	18	0.17%	1	0.01%	48	0.45%	230	2.14%	134	1.25%
Bellerive Acres	City	191	98	51.31%	84	43.98%	0	0.00%	0	0.00%	0	0.00%	0	0.00%	3	1.57%	6	3.14%
Bel-Nor	City	1,399	604	43.17%	635	45.39%	4	0.29%	50	3.57%	0	0.00%	11	0.79%	71	5.08%	24	1.72%
Bel-Ridge	City	2,132	244	11.44%	1,689	79.22%	7	0.33%	1	0.05%	0	0.00%	7	0.33%	90	4.22%	94	4.41%
Berkeley	City	8,228	906	11.01%	6,295	76.51%	19	0.23%	56	0.68%	6	0.07%	67	0.81%	337	4.10%	542	6.59%
Beverly Hills	City	475	18	3.79%	428	90.11%	1	0.21%	1	0.21%	0	0.00%	0	0.00%	22	4.63%	5	1.05%
Black Jack	City	6,634	631	9.51%	5,609	84.55%	18	0.27%	35	0.53%	4	0.06%	40	0.60%	216	3.26%	81	1.22%
Breckenridge Hills	City	4,458	1,541	34.57%	1,476	33.11%	15	0.34%	57	1.28%	0	0.00%	23	0.52%	232	5.20%	1,114	24.99%
Brentwood	City	8,233	6,674	81.06%	339	4.12%	15	0.18%	498	6.05%	1	0.01%	17	0.21%	389	4.72%	300	3.64%
Bridgeton	City	11,445	6,753	59.00%	2,781	24.30%	17	0.15%	368	3.22%	3	0.03%	46	0.40%	577	5.04%	900	7.86%
Calverton Park	City	1,143	434	37.97%	605	52.93%	0	0.00%	16	1.40%	0	0.00%	4	0.35%	58	5.07%	26	2.27%
Castle Point	CDP	2,815	119	4.23%	2,532	89.95%	4	0.14%	5	0.18%	0	0.00%	18	0.64%	83	2.95%	54	1.92%
Champ	Village	10	8	80.00%	0	0.00%	0	0.00%	0	0.00%	0	0.00%	0	0.00%	1	10.00%	1	10.00%
Charlack	City	1,304	548	42.02%	543	41.64%	5	0.38%	18	1.38%	0	0.00%	4	0.31%	75	5.75%	111	8.51%
Chesterfield	City	49,999	37,513	75.03%	1,571	3.14%	61	0.12%	7,178	14.36%	19	0.04%	150	0.30%	1,738	3.48%	1,769	3.54%
Clarkson Valley	City	2,609	2,316	88.77%	32	1.23%	4	0.15%	102	3.91%	0	0.00%	8	0.31%	62	2.38%	85	3.26%
Clayton	City	17,355	12,153	70.03%	1,376	7.93%	13	0.07%	2,226	12.83%	2	0.01%	74	0.43%	812	4.68%	699	4.03%
Concord	CDP	17,668	15,723	88.99%	156	0.88%	18	0.10%	535	3.03%	5	0.03%	48	0.27%	725	4.10%	458	2.59%
Cool Valley	City	1,039	102	9.82%	858	82.58%	3	0.29%	4	0.38%	0	0.00%	8	0.77%	28	2.69%	36	3.46%
Country Club Hills	City	1,014	62	6.11%	917	90.43%	0	0.00%	1	0.10%	0	0.00%	1	0.10%	24	2.37%	9	0.89%
Country Life Acres	Village	72	67	93.06%	0	0.00%	1	1.39%	0	0.00%	1	1.39%	1	1.39%	1	1.39%	1	1.39%
Crestwood	City	12,404	10,985	88.56%	213	1.72%	14	0.11%	269	2.17%	4	0.03%	70	0.56%	522	4.21%	327	2.64%
Creve Coeur	City	18,834	13,225	70.22%	1,690	8.97%	22	0.12%	2,356	12.51%	6	0.03%	154	0.82%	719	3.82%	662	3.51%
Crystal Lake Park	City	508	401	78.94%	21	4.13%	0	0.00%	45	8.86%	0	0.00%	7	1.38%	16	3.15%	18	3.54%
Dellwood	City	4,914	503	10.24%	4,160	84.66%	7	0.14%	39	0.79%	1	0.02%	14	0.28%	119	2.42%	71	1.44%
Des Peres	City	9,193	8,205	89.25%	109	1.19%	2	0.02%	293	3.19%	5	0.05%	22	0.24%	337	3.67%	220	2.39%
Edmundson	City	860	325	37.79%	290	33.72%	0	0.00%	14	1.63%	0	0.00%	9	1.05%	70	8.14%	152	17.67%
Ellisville	City	9,985	8,143	81.55%	246	2.46%	4	0.04%	729	7.30%	0	0.00%	43	0.43%	415	4.16%	405	4.06%
Eureka ‡	City	11,646	10,469	89.89%	95	0.82%	7	0.06%	181	1.55%	5	0.04%	11	0.09%	490	4.21%	388	3.33%
Fenton	City	3,989	3,625	90.87%	24	0.60%	0	0.00%	94	2.36%	1	0.03%	3	0.08%	140	3.51%	102	2.56%
Ferguson	City	18,527	3,926	21.19%	13,302	71.80%	29	0.16%	96	0.52%	8	0.04%	114	0.62%	685	3.70%	367	1.98%
Flordell Hills	City	724	28	3.87%	659	91.02%	0	0.00%	0	0.00%	0	0.00%	8	1.10%	16	2.21%	13	1.80%
Florissant	City	52,533	23,980	45.65%	23,377	44.50%	94	0.18%	519	0.99%	12	0.02%	347	0.66%	2,642	5.03%	1,562	2.97%
Frontenac	City	3,612	2,948	81.62%	84	2.33%	1	0.03%	337	9.33%	0	0.00%	25	0.69%	124	3.43%	93	2.57%
Glasgow Village	CDP	4,584	357	7.79%	4,032	87.96%	8	0.17%	2	0.04%	2	0.04%	5	0.11%	140	3.05%	38	0.83%
Glendale	City	6,176	5,706	92.39%	41	0.66%	3	0.05%	57	0.92%	0	0.00%	12	0.19%	179	2.90%	178	2.88%
Grantwood Village	Village	941	879	93.41%	6	0.64%	0	0.00%	9	0.96%	0	0.00%	1	0.11%	31	3.29%	15	1.59%
Green Park	City	2,705	2,341	86.54%	46	1.70%	4	0.15%	120	4.44%	0	0.00%	8	0.30%	84	3.11%	102	3.77%
Greendale	City	642	125	19.47%	437	68.07%	2	0.31%	27	4.21%	0	0.00%	3	0.47%	25	3.89%	23	3.58%
Hanley Hills	Village	2,009	210	10.45%	1,642	81.73%	1	0.05%	5	0.25%	0	0.00%	13	0.65%	78	3.88%	60	2.99%
Hazelwood	City	25,458	11,314	44.44%	11,103	43.61%	52	0.20%	388	1.52%	10	0.04%	210	0.82%	1,321	5.19%	1,060	4.16%
Hillsdale	Village	1,216	23	1.89%	1,130	92.93%	5	0.41%	1	0.08%	0	0.00%	6	0.49%	33	2.71%	18	1.48%
Huntleigh	City	361	320	88.64%	1	0.28%	0	0.00%	10	2.77%	0	0.00%	1	0.28%	13	3.60%	16	4.43%
Jennings	City	12,895	675	5.23%	11,695	90.69%	20	0.16%	29	0.22%	1	0.01%	38	0.29%	316	2.45%	121	0.94%
Kinloch	City	263	78	29.66%	147	55.89%	1	0.38%	7	2.66%	0	0.00%	2	0.76%	10	3.80%	18	6.84%
Kirkwood	City	29,461	25,180	85.47%	1,662	5.64%	15	0.05%	457	1.55%	10	0.03%	91	0.31%	1,226	4.16%	820	2.78%
Ladue	City	8,989	7,748	86.19%	101	1.12%	8	0.09%	510	5.67%	0	0.00%	29	0.32%	378	4.21%	215	2.39%
Lemay	CDP	17,117	13,655	79.77%	837	4.89%	51	0.30%	671	3.92%	4	0.02%	55	0.32%	998	5.83%	846	4.94%
Lakeshire	City	1,554	1,340	86.23%	52	3.35%	6	0.39%	20	1.29%	0	0.00%	9	0.58%	85	5.47%	42	2.70%
Manchester	City	18,333	14,719	80.29%	647	3.53%	16	0.09%	1,241	6.77%	2	0.01%	48	0.26%	920	5.02%	740	4.04%
Maplewood	City	8,269	6,001	72.57%	1,084	13.11%	14	0.17%	269	3.25%	6	0.07%	42	0.51%	505	6.11%	348	4.21%
Marlborough	Village	2,221	1,594	71.77%	279	12.56%	1	0.05%	107	4.82%	0	0.00%	10	0.45%	104	4.68%	126	5.67%
Maryland Heights	City	28,284	16,318	57.69%	4,314	15.25%	66	0.23%	4,629	16.37%	18	0.06%	262	0.93%	1,313	4.64%	1,364	4.82%
Mehlville	CDP	28,955	24,199	83.57%	1,313	4.53%	32	0.11%	915	3.16%	5	0.02%	95	0.33%	1,366	4.72%	1,030	3.56%
Moline Acres	City	2,156	68	3.15%	2,011	93.27%	5	0.23%	1	0.05%	0	0.00%	12	0.56%	41	1.90%	18	0.83%
Normandy	City	4,287	758	17.68%	3,010	70.21%	10	0.23%	243	5.67%	0	0.00%	24	0.56%	125	2.92%	117	2.73%
Northwoods	City	3,687	113	3.06%	3,420	92.76%	3	0.08%	6	0.16%	2	0.05%	16	0.43%	90	2.44%	37	1.00%
Norwood Court	Village	890	26	2.92%	829	93.15%	3	0.34%	2	0.22%	1	0.11%	0	0.00%	14	1.57%	15	1.69%
Oakland	City	1,390	1,268	91.22%	39	2.81%	4	0.29%	17	1.22%	0	0.00%	5	0.36%	32	2.30%	25	1.80%
Oakville	CDP	36,301	32,580	89.75%	598	1.65%	53	0.15%	711	1.96%	7	0.02%	97	0.27%	1,368	3.77%	887	2.44%
Old Jamestown	CDP	19,790	4,832	24.42%	13,531	68.37%	26	0.13%	307	1.55%	3	0.02%	132	0.67%	636	3.21%	323	1.63%
Olivette	City	1,390	1,268	91.22%	39	2.81%	4	0.29%	17	1.22%	0	0.00%	5	0.36%	32	2.30%	25	1.80%
Overland	City	15,955	8,676	54.38%	3,597	22.54%	36	0.23%	514	3.22%	1	0.01%	122	0.76%	920	5.77%	2,089	13.09%
Pacific ‡	City	7,414	5,984	80.71%	734	9.90%	29	0.39%	54	0.73%	1	0.01%	26	0.35%	359	4.84%	227	3.06%
Pagedale	City	2,554	78	3.05%	2,324	90.99%	1	0.04%	3	0.12%	0	0.00%	5	0.20%	68	2.66%	75	2.94%
Pasadena Hills	City	912	247	27.08%	597	65.46%	3	0.33%	10	1.10%	0	0.00%	0	0.00%	41	4.50%	14	1.54%
Pasadena Park	Village	435	129	29.66%	293	67.36%	0	0.00%	2	0.46%	0	0.00%	3	0.69%	6	1.38%	2	0.46%
Pine Lawn	City	2,754	44	1.60%	2,600	94.41%	0	0.00%	2	0.07%	2	0.07%	27	0.98%	71	2.58%	8	0.29%
Richmond Heights	City	9,286	7,155	77.05%	800	8.62%	9	0.10%	543	5.85%	0	0.00%	30	0.32%	381	4.10%	368	3.96%
Riverview	City	2,397	417	17.40%	1,821	75.97%	11	0.46%	9	0.38%	3	0.13%	13	0.54%	89	3.71%	34	1.42%
Rock Hill	City	7,414	5,984	80.71%	734	9.90%	29	0.39%	54	0.73%	1	0.01%	26	0.35%	359	4.84%	227	3.06%
Sappington	CDP	7,995	6,987	87.39%	151	1.89%	7	0.09%	241	3.01%	1	0.01%	15	0.19%	318	3.98%	275	3.44%
Shrewsbury	City	6,406	5,410	84.45%	325	5.07%	15	0.23%	195	3.04%	0	0.00%	24	0.37%	233	3.64%	204	3.18%
Spanish Lake	CDP	18,413	2,107	11.44%	15,145	82.25%	63	0.34%	56	0.30%	1	0.01%	159	0.86%	550	2.99%	332	1.80%
St. Ann	City	13,019	7,027	53.97%	3,806	29.23%	43	0.33%	361	2.77%	7	0.05%	103	0.79%	770	5.91%	902	6.93%
St. John	City	6,643	3,266	49.16%	2,090	31.46%	17	0.26%	124	1.87%	0	0.00%	34	0.51%	400	6.02%	712	10.72%
St. George	CDP	1,553	1,381	88.92%	39	2.51%	0	0.00%	25	1.61%	0	0.00%	11	0.71%	53	3.41%	44	2.83%
Sunset Hills	City	9,198	8,223	89.40%	77	0.84%	7	0.08%	278	3.02%	0	0.00%	25	0.27%	357	3.88%	231	2.51%
Sycamore Hills	Village	561	394	70.23%	100	17.83%	0	0.00%	5	0.89%	0	0.00%	1	0.18%	32	5.70%	29	5.17%
Town and Country	City	11,640	8,862	76.13%	300	2.58%	6	0.05%	1,262	10.84%	3	0.03%	54	0.46%	391	3.36%	762	6.55%
Twin Oaks	City	605	527	87.11%	12	1.98%	1	0.17%	22	3.64%	0	0.00%	1	0.17%	27	4.46%	15	2.48%
University City	City	35,065	16,876	48.13%	12,774	36.43%	35	0.10%	2,256	6.43%	16	0.05%	264	0.75%	1,464	4.18%	1,380	3.94%
Uplands Park	Village	312	3	0.96%	299	95.83%	2	0.64%	0	0.00%	0	0.00%	1	0.32%	4	1.28%	3	0.96%
Valley Park	City	6,885	5,473	79.49%	296	4.30%	3	0.04%	357	5.19%	1	0.01%	22	0.32%	377	5.48%	356	5.17%
Velda City	City	1,188	29	2.44%	1,090	91.75%	3	0.25%	2	0.17%	0	0.00%	9	0.76%	34	2.86%	21	1.77%
Velda Village Hills	City	881	16	1.82%	830	94.21%	1	0.11%	2	0.23%	0	0.00%	6	0.68%	19	2.16%	7	0.79%
Vinita Park	City	1,970	469	23.81%	1,230	62.44%	3	0.15%	19	0.96%	0	0.00%	21	1.07%	73	3.71%	155	7.87%
Warson Woods	City	6,885	5,473	79.49%	296	4.30%	3	0.04%	357	5.19%	1	0.01%	22	0.32%	377	5.48%	356	5.17%
Webster Groves	City	24,010	20,677	86.12%	1,146	4.77%	20	0.08%	391	1.63%	3	0.01%	87	0.36%	953	3.97%	733	3.05%
Wellston	City	1,537	35	2.28%	1,430	93.04%	5	0.33%	1	0.07%	0	0.00%	10	0.65%	31	2.02%	25	1.63%
Westwood	Village	316	247	78.16%	10	3.16%	0	0.00%	34	10.76%	0	0.00%	0	0.00%	9	2.85%	16	5.06%
Wildwood	City	35,417	30,044	84.83%	549	1.55%	40	0.11%	2,113	5.97%	7	0.02%	110	0.31%	1,388	3.92%	1,166	3.29%
Wilbur Park	Village	439	392	89.29%	14	3.19%	0	0.00%	1	0.23%	1	0.23%	1	0.23%	17	3.87%	13	2.96%
Winchester	City	1,447	1,142	78.92%	51	3.52%	4	0.28%	37	2.56%	2	0.14%	4	0.28%	107	7.39%	100	6.91%
Woodson Terrace	City	3,950	1,763	44.63%	1,086	27.49%	16	0.41%	78	1.97%	3	0.08%	31	0.78%	245	6.20%	728	18.43%

=== 2020 census ===
As of the 2020 census, there were 1,004,125 people, 411,076 households, and 261,646 families in the county. The population density was 1,977.1 inhabitants per square mile (763.4/km^{2}). There were 444,653 housing units at an average density of 875.5 per square mile (338.0/km^{2}). The racial makeup of the county was 62.97% White, 24.56% African American, 0.24% Native American, 4.86% Asian, 0.03% Pacific Islander, 1.61% from some other races and 5.73% from two or more races. Hispanic or Latino people of any race were 3.70% of the population.

There were 411,076 households, out of which 53.46% had children under the age of 18 living with them, 44.55% were married couples living together, 14.55% had a female householder with no husband present, and 36.35% were non-families. 30.78% of all households were made up of individuals, and 5.57% had someone living alone who was 65 years of age or older. The average household size was 2.36 and the average family size was 3.05.

In the county, the age distribution of the population shows 21.88% under the age of 18, _% from 18 to 24, _% from 25 to 44, _% from 45 to 64, and _% who were 65 years of age or older. The median age was 40 years. For every 100 females, there were 90.00 males. For every 100 females age 18 and over, there were 85.70 males.

The median income for a household in the county was $58,532, and the median income for a family was $72,680. Males had a median income of $45,714 versus $30,278 for females. The per capita income for the county was $27,595. About 5.00% of families and 6.90% of the population were below the poverty line, including 9.30% of those under age 18 and 5.30% of those age 65 or over.

The 2020 census reported that 98.6% of residents lived in urban areas while 1.4% lived in rural areas.

== Economy ==
=== Top employers ===
According to the county's 2023 Annual Comprehensive Financial Report, the largest employers in the county are:

#	Employer	# of Employees	Percentage
1	Washington University in St. Louis	19,617	3.7%
2	Boeing Defense, Space & Security	15,796	3.0%
3	Mercy Healthcare	15,084	2.9%
4	SSM Healthcare	14,226	2.7%
5	Schnucks Markets, Inc.	8,768	1.7%
6	Charter Communications	6,230	1.2%
7	Special School District of St. Louis County	5,890	1.1%
8	Edward Jones	5,514	1.0%
9	St. Louis County Government	4,994	0.9%
10	Centene Corporation	4,677	0.9%
—	Total	100,796	19.1%

=== Unemployment rate ===
The United States Department of Labor's Bureau of Labor Statistics unemployment rate (not seasonally adjusted).

Unemployment in St. Louis County
Calendar 2024	Labor Force	Employment	Unemployment	Unemployment Rate
December	542,369	525,422	16,947	3.1%
November	545,225	527,758	17,467	3.2%
October	547,919	529,681	18,238	3.3%
September	544,309	527,810	16,499	3.0%
August	550,976	529,958	21,018	3.8%
July	557,776	533,387	24,389	4.4%
June	548,648	526,436	22,212	4.0%
May	546,209	525,458	20,751	3.8%
April	543,967	526,791	17,176	3.2%
March	537,868	518,706	19,162	3.6%
February	533,156	513,339	19,817	3.7%
January	530,612	512,118	18,494	3.5%

== Parks and recreation ==
St. Louis County owns and maintains more than 40 parks as part of its county park system, including playgrounds and nature preserves. It also operates several recreation centers, the National Museum of Transportation, and the Affton Community Center. In addition to parks owned by St. Louis County, the county is home to three Missouri state parks: Babler, Castlewood, and Route 66 State Park, and part of the Big Muddy National Fish and Wildlife Refuge and the Ulysses S. Grant National Historic Site. Several municipalities in the county also own and maintain their own park systems.

Parks owned by St. Louis County
Name	Area (acres)	Region of St. Louis County†
Bee Tree Park	199	South
Bella Fontaine Park	300	North
Bissell House	9.3	North
Black Forest Park	4.3	South
Bohrer Park	16	South
Bon Oak Park	15	North
Buder Park	75	South
Castlepoint Park	11	North
Cliff Cave Park	560	South
Clydesdale Park	117	South
Creve Coeur Park	2,114	West
Ebsworth Park	10.5	West
Endicott Park	24	North
Faust Park	197	West
Endicott Park	24	North
Fort Bellefontaine Park	305.6	North
Greensfelder County Park	1,646	West
Jefferson Barracks Park	426	South
King Park	4	North
Kinloch Park	9	North
Laumeier Sculpture Park	105	South
Larimore Park	22	North
Lemay Park	18.5	South
Lone Elk County Park	546	West
Love Park	89	West
Mathilda-Welmering Park	6	South
McDonnell Park	133	North
Memorial Park	2.7	North
Ohlendorf Park	10	South
Queeny Park	564	West
Sioux Passage Park	188	North
Simpson Park	206	South
Spanish Lake Park	245	North
Stacy Park	35	West
St. Vincent Park	133	North
Suson Park	98	South
Sylvan Springs Park	70	South
Tilles Park	75	West
Unger Park	140	South
Veterans Memorial Park	250	North
West Tyson County Park	670	West
Winter Park	160	South
† Regions of St. Louis County as defined by the St. Louis County Parks and Recreation Department.

== Government ==
St. Louis County government is divided between executive power vested in the County Executive and legislative power vested in the County Council. The current county executive is Sam Page, who was appointed on April 29, 2019. The county executive's term is four years without term limits, and the position is elected by the population of the entire county. The council consists of seven members elected from separate districts within the county, with four-year terms beginning on January 1 following elections. In 1950, St. Louis County became the first Missouri county to adopt a home-rule charter under the Missouri Constitution, and the current charter was adopted by voters on November 6, 1979.

St. Louis County, Missouri

Elected countywide officials
Assessor	Jake Zimmerman	Democratic
County Executive	Sam Page	Democratic
Prosecuting Attorney	Melissa Price Smith	Democratic

=== Public safety ===
The St. Louis County Police Department operates under the authority of the St. Louis County Board of Police Commissioners and is the largest law enforcement agency in St. Louis County. Although it is directly responsible for law enforcement in unincorporated areas of the county, several municipalities contract with the county police for public safety services. Municipalities that maintain service agreements with the county police are Black Jack, Fenton, Ferguson, Grantwood Village, Green Park, Hanley Hills, Jennings, Marlborough, Norwood Court, Pasadena Hills, Twin Oaks, Valley Park, Wilbur Park, and Wildwood. A total of 58 of the 90 municipalities in the county maintain their own police departments. Eighty-one of the local towns run their own courts.

St. Louis County fire services are provided by 20 municipal fire departments and 23 fire protection districts. The fire protection districts exist as independent, taxing governments that are unrelated to the St. Louis County government, while the municipal fire departments are funded through municipal taxes and are administered by their respective cities.

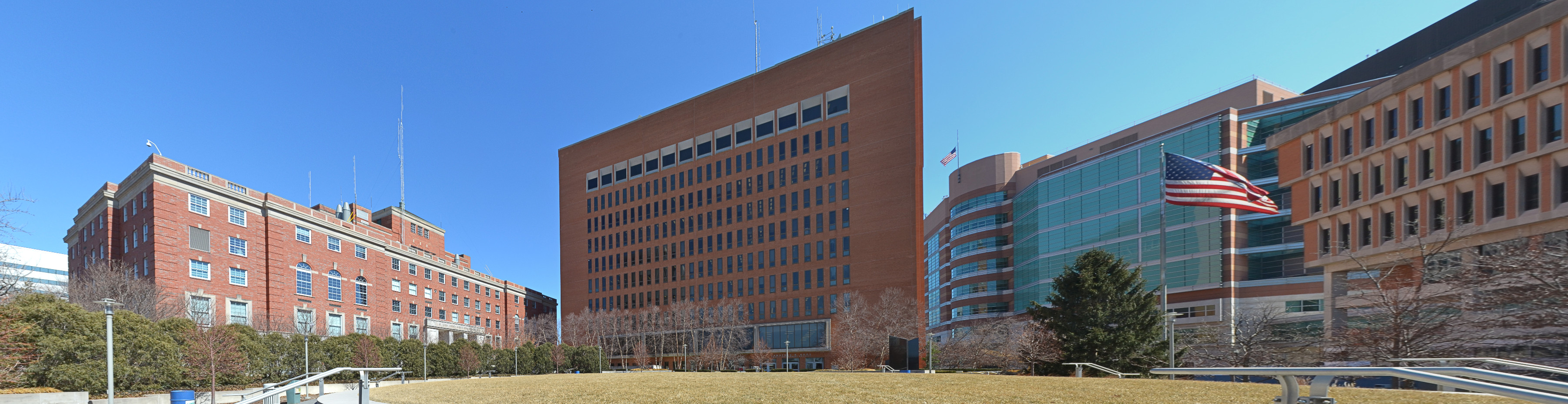
County government buildings in Clayton. From left to right: County Police headquarters, the Lawrence K. Roos County Government Building, the Buzz Westfall Justice Center, and the Courts Building

Past gubernatorial election results
Year	Republican	Democratic	Third Parties
2024	40.25% 201,181	57.81% 288,946	1.94% 9,694
2020	38.77% 207,535	59.28% 317,327	1.95% 10,413
2016	38.76% 199,827	58.40% 301,115	2.77% 14,299
2012	35.62% 185,704	62.30% 324,748	3.85% 19,652
2008	32.92% 180,278	65.32% 357,649	1.71% 9,396
2004	44.09% 238,783	54.77% 296,624	1.13% 6,127
2000	48.01% 233,031	49.31% 239,341	2.68% 12,997
1996	45.09% 208,184	53.12% 245,275	1.79% 8,259

=== Politics ===
United States presidential election results for St. Louis County, Missouri
Year	Republican		Democratic		Third party(ies)	
Year	No.	%	No.	%	No.	%
1888	4,416	61.54%	2,707	37.72%	53	0.74%
1892	4,367	57.83%	3,116	41.26%	69	0.91%
1896	6,210	64.09%	3,403	35.12%	76	0.78%
1900	6,537	61.83%	3,864	36.55%	172	1.63%
1904	7,375	69.45%	2,870	27.03%	374	3.52%
1908	10,177	66.40%	4,522	29.51%	627	4.09%
1912	6,177	39.78%	5,409	34.84%	3,940	25.38%
1916	12,485	60.41%	7,587	36.71%	594	2.87%
1920	25,008	63.57%	12,438	31.62%	1,896	4.82%
1924	26,669	55.75%	16,075	33.61%	5,090	10.64%
1928	42,572	55.53%	33,802	44.09%	293	0.38%
1932	35,872	36.51%	59,044	60.09%	3,341	3.40%
1936	45,541	40.63%	63,226	56.40%	3,333	2.97%
1940	66,909	55.88%	52,380	43.74%	458	0.38%
1944	64,131	52.45%	57,780	47.26%	355	0.29%
1948	69,592	52.17%	62,684	47.00%	1,107	0.83%
1952	116,821	54.98%	95,457	44.93%	202	0.10%
1956	138,111	53.12%	121,881	46.88%	0	0.00%
1960	157,992	48.69%	166,508	51.31%	0	0.00%
1964	134,962	38.71%	213,658	61.29%	0	0.00%
1968	180,355	46.80%	165,786	43.02%	39,234	10.18%
1972	264,147	62.16%	160,801	37.84%	0	0.00%
1976	246,988	54.57%	196,915	43.51%	8,723	1.93%
1980	263,518	54.35%	192,796	39.77%	28,517	5.88%
1984	307,684	63.99%	173,144	36.01%	0	0.00%
1988	262,784	54.67%	216,534	45.05%	1,364	0.28%
1992	188,285	35.21%	235,760	44.09%	110,718	20.70%
1996	196,096	42.42%	225,524	48.79%	40,658	8.80%
2000	224,689	46.15%	250,631	51.48%	11,564	2.38%
2004	244,969	45.12%	295,284	54.38%	2,730	0.50%
2008	221,705	39.60%	333,123	59.50%	5,026	0.90%
2012	224,742	42.39%	297,097	56.04%	8,277	1.56%
2016	202,434	38.95%	286,704	55.17%	30,548	5.88%
2020	199,493	37.19%	328,151	61.17%	8,802	1.64%
2024	187,982	37.39%	305,635	60.79%	9,121	1.81%

As of March 2016, there were 648,073 registered voters in St. Louis County, down from 708,283 registered voters in April 2013. At the federal level, the county is represented by Democrat Wesley Bell of the 1st district, and Republican Ann Wagner of the 2nd district.

Since 1992, the county has favored Democratic candidates in the presidential elections. Democrats are generally strongest in the northern portion of the county, which has a high Black population, while Republicans have historically dominated the western and southern parts of the county. In recent years however, Republicans have seen the western and southern portion of the county, made up of suburbs, become much more competitive. St. Louis County is a diverse, college-educated, suburban, and affluent county, with a large Black population, as well as a new influx of Asian Americans. These factors in recent years have pushed the county to become safer for Democrats. Historically, the Republican voters in this area were more moderate voters, fiscally conservative yet socially liberal. St Louis County overall is a Democratic stronghold, having voted for the Democratic presidential nominee in each election since 1992, and with increasing margins since 2000. In 2004, 2012, 2016, and 2020, it was only one of four counties in the state to vote Democratic. In 2020, Joe Biden won the county with over 60% of the vote, the best ever showing for a Democrat in the county.

As of the 2022 elections, of the five senators (who have residences in St. Louis County) elected to the Missouri Senate, four are Democrats and one is a Republican. Of the 27 representatives elected to the Missouri House of Representatives, 19 are Democrats and 8 are Republicans. All of North County elects Democrats to the Missouri General Assembly, most of Mid County also elect Democrats, while most of West County and South County elects Republicans.

== Education ==
Education in St. Louis County is provided by 23 public school districts, 20 private high schools, both a unified public library system and several municipal libraries, and several colleges and universities. Several of the school districts in the county also maintain a voluntary student transfer agreement with the St. Louis Public Schools that allows county residents to attend magnet schools in the city of St. Louis.

=== Public schools ===
School districts include:

- Affton School District
- Bayless School District
- Brentwood School District
- School District of Clayton
- Ferguson-Florissant School District
- Hancock Place School District
- Hazelwood School District
- Jennings School District
- Kirkwood School District
- Ladue School District
- Lindbergh Schools
- Maplewood Richmond Heights School District
- Mehlville School District
- Meramec Valley R-III School District
- Normandy Schools Collaborative
- Parkway School District
- Pattonville School District
- Ritenour School District
- Riverview Gardens School District
- Rockwood School District
- School District of University City
- Valley Park School District
- Webster Groves School District

Special School District of St. Louis County (SSD) operates schools for disabled students.

The Berkeley and Kinloch districts merged into Ferguson-Florissant in 1975. Wellston School District closed in 2010 and was consolidated into the Normandy district.

=== Private schools ===
- Barat Academy
- Chaminade College Preparatory School (All Boys)
- Christian Brothers College High School (All Boys)
- Cor Jesu Academy (All Girls)
- De Smet Jesuit High School (All Boys)
- Incarnate Word Academy (All Girls)
- John Burroughs School
- Lutheran High School North
- Lutheran High School South
- Mary Institute and St. Louis Country Day School
- Nerinx Hall High School (All Girls)
- The Principia
- Saint Louis Priory School (All Boys)
- St. John Vianney High School (All Boys)
- St. Joseph's Academy (All Girls)
- Ursuline Academy (All Girls)
- Villa Duchesne (All Girls)
- Visitation Academy of St. Louis (All Girls)
- Westminster Christian Academy
- Whitfield School

=== Higher education ===
- Concordia Seminary
- Eden Theological Seminary
- Fontbonne University
- Kenrick–Glennon Seminary
- Logan University
- Maryville University
- Missouri Baptist University
- St. Louis Christian College
- Saint Louis University
- St. Louis Community College
- University of Missouri–St. Louis
- Washington University in St. Louis
- Webster University

=== Library ===
St. Louis County libraries include the unified St. Louis County Library and several municipal library systems.

== Infrastructure ==
=== Transportation ===
==== Major freeways and highways ====
- I-44
  - I-44 BL (Pacific)
- I-55
- I-64 / US 40
- I-70
- I-170
- I-255
- I-270
- US 50
- US 61
- US 67
- Route 21
- Route 30
- Route 100
- Route 115
- Route 141
- Route 180
- Route 231
- Route 267
- Route 340
- Route 364
- Route 366
- Route 367
- Route 370

=== Health care ===
In 1927, a $1 million bond was issued allocating funds for the construction of the first St. Louis County Hospital. Construction of the 200-bed, the non-segregated hospital began in 1929 in the city of Clayton. The hospital opened in July 1931 and ran until June 1986.

Current list of hospitals in St. Louis County:

- Barnes–Jewish West County Hospital
- Christian Hospital
- dePaul Health Center - Bridgeton
- Des Peres Hospital - Des Peres
- DuBuis Hospital of St. Louis
- Mercy Hospital South - Mehlville
- Mercy Hospital Creve Coeur
- Missouri Baptist Medical Center - Town & Country
- Northwest HealthCare
- Ranken Jordan Pediatric Bridge Hospital - Maryland Heights
- St. Clare Hospital - Fenton
- St. John's Mercy Medical Center - Creve Coeur
- St. Luke's Hospital - Chesterfield
- St. Mary's Hospital - Richmond Heights

== Communities ==
One-third of the county population lives in unincorporated areas, for which the county government provides services such as zoning, code enforcement, refuse disposal, and police protection. In addition to the county-level government, there are 87 municipal governments in St. Louis County that also provide services. These vary widely in population and area. The smallest towns in population are Champ with a 2020 population of 10, Country Life Acres (population 74), and Mackenzie (population 134); 14 county municipalities have a 2010 population under 500, and fewer than a third exceed 10,000. In area, the smallest town is Mackenzie (12.8 acres (5.2 ha)) while 14 other towns are 0.1 square miles (0.26 km^{2}) or less. At the other end of the scale, Florissant has a population over 50,000, and Wildwood at the far west of the county is 66 square miles (170 km^{2}).

St. Louis County municipalities include:

=== Cities ===
- Ballwin
- Bella Villa
- Bellefontaine Neighbors
- Bellerive Acres
- Bel-Nor
- Bel-Ridge
- Berkeley
- Beverly Hills
- Black Jack
- Breckenridge Hills
- Brentwood
- Bridgeton
- Calverton Park
- Charlack
- Chesterfield
- Clarkson Valley
- Clayton (county seat)
- Cool Valley
- Country Club Hills
- Crestwood
- Creve Coeur
- Crystal Lake Park
- Dellwood
- Des Peres
- Edmundson
- Ellisville
- Eureka (Partly in Jefferson County)
- Fenton
- Ferguson
- Flordell Hills
- Florissant
- Frontenac
- Glendale
- Green Park
- Greendale
- Hazelwood
- Huntleigh
- Jennings
- Kinloch
- Kirkwood
- Ladue
- Lakeshire
- Manchester
- Maplewood
- Maryland Heights
- Moline Acres
- Normandy
- Northwoods
- Oakland
- Olivette
- Overland
- Pacific (mostly in Franklin County)
- Pagedale
- Pasadena Hills
- Pine Lawn
- Richmond Heights
- Riverview
- Rock Hill
- Shrewsbury
- St. Ann
- St. John
- Sunset Hills
- Town and Country
- Twin Oaks
- University City
- Valley Park
- Velda City
- Velda Village Hills
- Vinita Park
- Warson Woods
- Webster Groves
- Wellston
- Wildwood
- Winchester
- Woodson Terrace

=== Villages ===
- Champ
- Country Life Acres
- Grantwood Village
- Hanley Hills
- Hillsdale
- Marlborough
- Norwood Court
- Pasadena Park
- Sycamore Hills
- Uplands Park
- Westwood
- Wilbur Park

=== Census-designated places ===
- Affton
- Castle Point
- Concord
- Glasgow Village
- Lemay
- Mehlville
- Oakville
- Old Jamestown
- St. George
- Sappington
- Spanish Lake

=== Townships ===
- Airport
- Bonhomme
- Chesterfield
- Clayton
- Concord
- Creve Coeur
- Ferguson
- Florissant
- Gravois
- Hadley
- Jefferson
- Lafayette
- Lemay
- Lewis and Clark
- Maryland Heights
- Meramec
- Midland
- Missouri River
- Normandy
- Northwest
- Norwood
- Oakville
- Queeny
- Spanish Lake
- St. Ferdinand
- Tesson Ferry
- University
- Wildhorse

=== Unincorporated communities ===
- Ascalon
- Carsonville
- Earth City
- Fort Belle Fontaine
- Glencoe
- Grover
- Mackenzie
- Peerless Park
- Pond
- Sherman
- Times Beach

== See also ==
- List of counties in Missouri
- National Register of Historic Places listings in St. Louis County, Missouri
