= Keifer Creek =

Stream in the American state of Missouri

Coordinates: 38.548387°N 90.535123°W

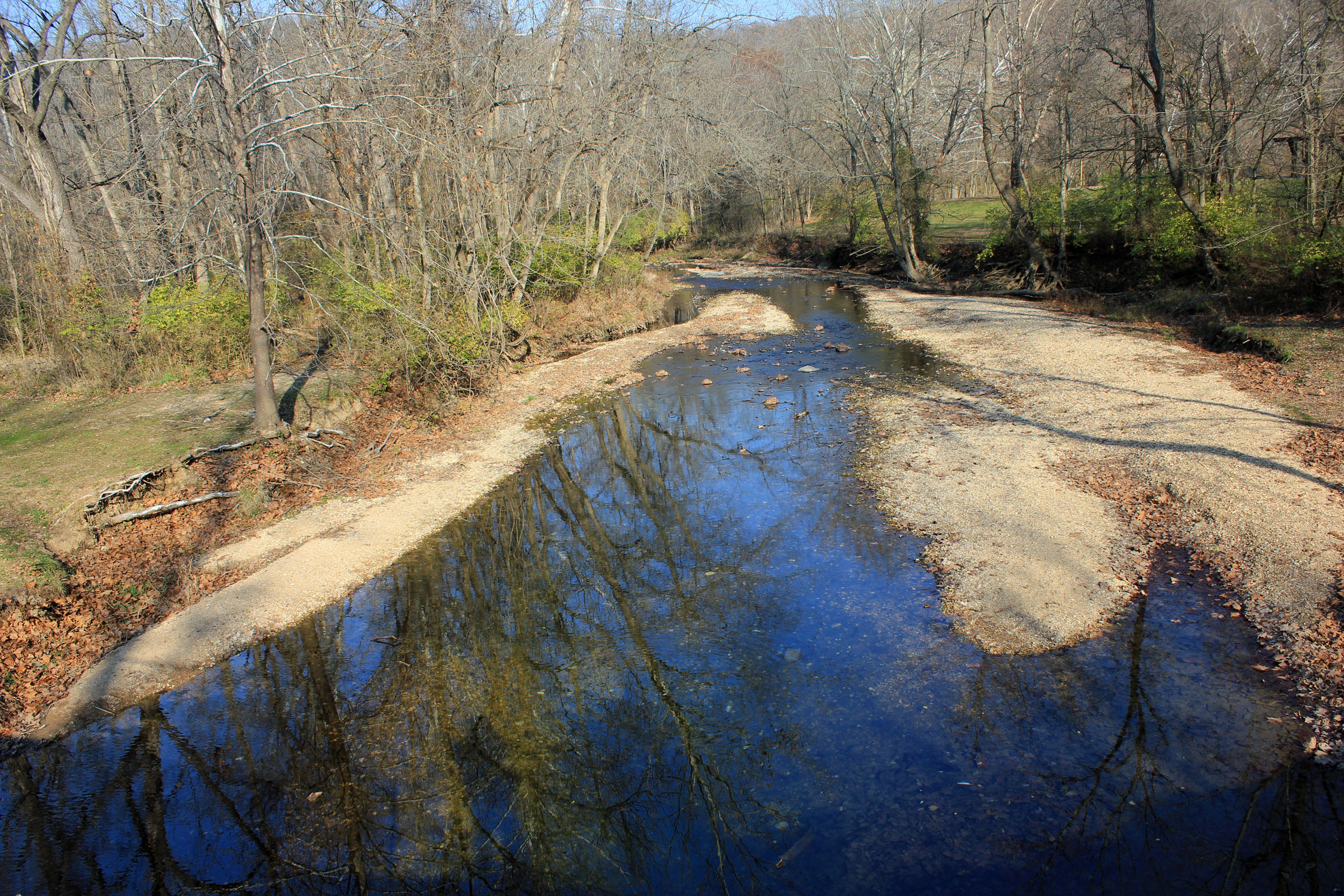
Keifer Creek at Castlewood State Park, November 2012

Keifer Creek is a stream in St. Louis County in the U.S. state of Missouri. It is a tributary of the Meramec River.

A variant spelling was "Keefer Creek". The creek has the name of the local Keefer family.

== See also ==
- List of rivers of Missouri
