= Special School District of St. Louis County =

School district in Missouri, United States

Special School District of St. Louis County (SSD) is a county-wide school district for children with disabilities and for vocational studies in St. Louis County, Missouri. Its headquarters are in Town and Country.

== History ==
It was created in 1957 because county parents wanted their children with disabilities to be educated; accordingly county residents voted for the creation of the district. Additionally, state-level politicians approved the district's creation. Holly K. Hacker of the St. Louis Post-Dispatch wrote that because children with disabilities were not guaranteed a public education at the time, the creation of the SSD "was a bold" action.

The district was aiming to fully establish itself circa 1960-1961.

In 1965 it also began establishing career and technical education programs for all residents in the county.

By 1999 the majority of students with disabilities received some services from the SSD but were primarily students of local school districts. The differences in operations and scheduling between the entities complicated the education of that group of students with disabilities.

The Special School District of St. Louis County collaborates with local public school districts to provide special education services, including individualized education programs (IEPs), speech therapy, and behavioral support. This partnership model allows students with disabilities to remain in their home schools while receiving specialized services, promoting inclusion and access to general education environments. Research on cooperative special education models suggests that such arrangements can improve academic outcomes and social integration for students with disabilities.

== Schools ==
Special Education Schools

- Ackerman School (Florissant) - Ages 5–14.
  - Its students come from the Ferguson-Florissant, Hazelwood, Jennings, and Riverview Gardens school districts.
- Litzsinger School (Ladue) - Ages 5–14.
  - Its students come from the Brentwood, Clayton, Kirkwood, Ladue, Maplewood-Richmond Heights, Normandy, Pattonville, Ritenour, and University City school districts. Additionally its service area includes portions of the Parkway and Rockwood school districts.
- Neuwoehner High School (Town and Country) - Ages 14–21.
  - Its service area is the same as that of Litzsinger.
- Northview High School (Florissant) - Ages 14–21.
  - Its service area is the same as that of Ackerman.
- Southview School (Sunset Hills) - Ages 5–21.
  - Its service area is the Affton, Bayless, Hancock Place, Lindbergh, Mehlville, Valley Park, and Webster Groves school districts. Additionally its service area includes portions of the Parkway and Rockwood school districts.

Career and technical education schools

- North Technical High School (North Tech) (Florissant)
- South Technical High School (South Tech) (Sunset Hills, St. Louis post office address)
