= South County car bomber =

Unidentified American murderer

The South County car bomber was a person (or persons) who terrorized south St. Louis County, Missouri, with a series of fatal car bombings in 1977.

== Event ==
Two people – Shirley Marie Flynn and Robert Curtis Jackson – were killed in bombings on October 18, 1977, and November 3, 1977, respectively. A third victim, Ronald Sterghos, escaped injury in an earlier attack on October 7, 1977.

The bombings ceased after that and were never solved, despite an extensive effort by police. The bombings have been described as random, and some investigators believed that they were the work of a deranged individual. Some authorities have, however, noted similarities between the St. Louis County bombings and a car bombing on March 7, 1978, in Paducah, Kentucky, in which William Ohlhausen, who had been Shirley Flynn's boyfriend, was seriously injured.

== See also ==
- List of fugitives from justice who disappeared
- List of unsolved murders (1900–1979)
