= Velda City, Missouri =

- City
- Location of Velda City, Missouri
- Coordinates: 38°41′39″N 90°17′36″W
- Country: United States
- State: Missouri
- County: St. Louis

Government
  - Mayor: Melda Bernard Collins
  - City Clerk: Valarie Gardner

Area
  - Total: 0.16 sq mi (0.42 km^{2})
  - Land: 0.16 sq mi (0.42 km^{2})
  - Water: 0 sq mi (0.00 km^{2})
- Elevation: 607 ft (185 m)

Population (2020)
  - Total: 1,188
  - Density: 7,287.8/sq mi (2,813.83/km^{2})
- Time zone: UTC-6 (Central (CST))
  - Summer (DST): UTC-5 (CDT)
- ZIP code: 63121
- Area code: 314
- FIPS code: 29-75796
- GNIS feature ID: 2397122
- Website: https://veldacity.org

Velda City is a city in St. Louis County, Missouri, United States. As of the 2020 census, Velda City had a population of 1,188.

== Geography ==
According to the United States Census Bureau, the city has a total area of 0.16 square miles (0.41 km^{2}), all land.

Velda City has the highest population density of any municipality in Missouri.

== Demographics ==
Historical population
| Census | Pop. | Note | %± |
|---|---|---|---|
| 1940 | 495 | | — |
| 1950 | 480 | | −3.0% |
| 1960 | 524 | | 9.2% |
| 1970 | 2,112 | | 303.1% |
| 1980 | 1,979 | | −6.3% |
| 1990 | 1,597 | | −19.3% |
| 2000 | 1,616 | | 1.2% |
| 2010 | 1,420 | | −12.1% |
| 2020 | 1,188 | | −16.3% |
U.S. Decennial Census

=== 2020 census ===
Velda City, Missouri – Racial and ethnic composition Note: the US Census treats Hispanic/Latino as an ethnic category. This table excludes Latinos from the racial categories and assigns them to a separate category. Hispanics/Latinos may be of any race.
| Race / Ethnicity (NH = Non-Hispanic) | Pop 2000 | Pop 2010 | Pop 2020 | % 2000 | % 2010 | % 2020 |
|---|---|---|---|---|---|---|
| White alone (NH) | 49 | 42 | 29 | 3.03% | 2.96% | 2.44% |
| Black or African American alone (NH) | 1,543 | 1,353 | 1,090 | 95.48% | 95.28% | 91.75% |
| Native American or Alaska Native alone (NH) | 0 | 1 | 3 | 0.00% | 0.07% | 0.25% |
| Asian alone (NH) | 0 | 1 | 2 | 0.00% | 0.07% | 0.17% |
| Native Hawaiian or Pacific Islander alone (NH) | 0 | 0 | 0 | 0.00% | 0.00% | 0.00% |
| Other race alone (NH) | 0 | 0 | 9 | 0.00% | 0.00% | 0.76% |
| Mixed race or Multiracial (NH) | 10 | 16 | 34 | 0.62% | 1.13% | 2.86% |
| Hispanic or Latino (any race) | 14 | 7 | 21 | 0.87% | 0.49% | 1.77% |
| Total | 1,616 | 1,420 | 1,188 | 100.00% | 100.00% | 100.00% |

=== 2010 census ===
As of the census of 2010, there were 1,420 people, 578 households, and 363 families living in the city. The population density was 8,875.0 inhabitants per square mile (3,426.7/km^{2}). There were 654 housing units at an average density of 4,087.5 per square mile (1,578.2/km^{2}). The racial makeup of the city was 3.0% White, 95.4% African American, 0.1% Native American, 0.1% Asian, 0.4% from other races, and 1.1% from two or more races. Hispanic or Latino of any race were 0.5% of the population.

There were 578 households, of which 34.6% had children under the age of 18 living with them, 18.7% were married couples living together, 37.2% had a female householder with no husband present, 6.9% had a male householder with no wife present, and 37.2% were non-families. 32.5% of all households were made up of individuals, and 11.4% had someone living alone who was 65 years of age or older. The average household size was 2.46 and the average family size was 3.10.

The median age in the city was 37 years. 25.7% of residents were under the age of 18; 9.8% were between the ages of 18 and 24; 23.4% were from 25 to 44; 26.6% were from 45 to 64; and 14.6% were 65 years of age or older. The gender makeup of the city was 43.6% male and 56.4% female.

=== 2000 census ===
As of the census of 2000, there were 1,616 people, 610 households, and 428 families living in the city. The population density was 9,872.8 inhabitants per square mile (3,811.9/km^{2}). There were 670 housing units at an average density of 4,093.3 per square mile (1,580.4/km^{2}). The racial makeup of the city was 96.04% African American, 3.09% White, and 0.87% from two or more races. Hispanic or Latino of any race were 0.87% of the population.

There were 610 households, out of which 28.4% had children under the age of 18 living with them, 29.5% were married couples living together, 35.9% had a female householder with no husband present, and 29.7% were non-families. 27.5% of all households were made up of individuals, and 9.0% had someone living alone who was 65 years of age or older. The average household size was 2.65 and the average family size was 3.20.

In the city, the population was spread out, with 27.0% under the age of 18, 9.4% from 18 to 24, 26.5% from 25 to 44, 24.6% from 45 to 64, and 12.5% who were 65 years of age or older. The median age was 36 years. For every 100 females, there were 76.8 males. For every 100 females age 18 and over, there were 68.7 males.

The median income for a household in the city was $30,000, and the median income for a family was $31,652. Males had a median income of $27,768 versus $26,083 for females. The per capita income for the city was $15,009. About 15.9% of families and 17.5% of the population were below the poverty line, including 19.8% of those under age 18 and 23.3% of those age 65 or over.

== Education ==
It is in the Normandy Schools Collaborative school district. The comprehensive high school of the district is Normandy High School.
