= Missouri River Township, St. Louis County, Missouri =

Township in the US state of Missouri

Coordinates: 38°40′0″N 90°29′49″W

Missouri River Township is a township in St. Louis County, in the U.S. state of Missouri. Its population was 34,992 as of the 2010 census.
