= Mackenzie, Missouri =

- Unincorporated Community
- Location of Mackenzie, Missouri
- Coordinates: 38°34′51″N 90°18′59″W
- Country: United States
- State: Missouri
- County: St. Louis

Area
  - Total: 0.019 sq mi (0.05 km^{2})
  - Land: 0.019 sq mi (0.05 km^{2})
  - Water: 0 sq mi (0 km^{2})
- Elevation: 427 ft (130 m)

Population (2010)
  - Total: 134
  - Estimate (2016): 132
  - Density: 6,900/sq mi (2,700/km^{2})
- Time zone: UTC-6 (Central (CST))
  - Summer (DST): UTC-5 (CDT)
- FIPS code: 29-45110
- GNIS feature ID: 2399216

Mackenzie is an unincorporated community in St. Louis County, Missouri, United States. The population was 134 at the 2010 census.

In April 2018, the village of Mackenzie voted to dissolve, reverting to unincorporated St. Louis County, effective midnight June 25, 2018.

== Geography ==
According to the United States Census Bureau, the village has a total area of 0.02 square miles (0.05 km^{2}), all land.

== Demographics ==
Historical population
Census	Pop.	Note	%±
1950	247		—
1960	283		14.6%
1970	224		−20.8%
1980	186		−17.0%
1990	148		−20.4%
2000	137		−7.4%
2010	134		−2.2%
2016 (est.)	132		−1.5%
U.S. Decennial Census

=== 2010 census ===
As of the census of 2010, there were 134 people, 65 households, and 35 families living in the village. The population density was 6,700.0 inhabitants per square mile (2,586.9/km^{2}). There were 69 housing units at an average density of 3,450.0 per square mile (1,332.1/km^{2}). The racial makeup of the village was 99.3% White and 0.7% from two or more races. Hispanic or Latino of any race were 0.7% of the population.

There were 65 households, of which 23.1% had children under the age of 18 living with them, 38.5% were married couples living together, 10.8% had a female householder with no husband present, 4.6% had a male householder with no wife present, and 46.2% were non-families. 38.5% of all households were made up of individuals, and 7.7% had someone living alone who was 65 years of age or older. The average household size was 2.06 and the average family size was 2.69.

The median age in the village was 35.5 years. 14.2% of residents were under the age of 18; 7.4% were between the ages of 18 and 24; 43.4% were from 25 to 44; 23.9% were from 45 to 64; and 11.2% were 65 years of age or older. The gender makeup of the village was 46.3% male and 53.7% female.

=== 2000 census ===
As of the census of 2000, there were 137 people, 64 households, and 35 families living in the village. The population density was 5,316.4 inhabitants per square mile (2,052.7/km^{2}). There were 66 housing units at an average density of 2,561.2 per square mile (988.9/km^{2}). The racial makeup of the village was 97.08% White and 2.92% Asian. Hispanic or Latino of any race were 2.19% of the population.

There were 64 households, out of which 23.4% had children under the age of 18 living with them, 40.6% were married couples living together, 12.5% had a female householder with no husband present, and 45.3% were non-families. 39.1% of all households were made up of individuals, and 12.5% had someone living alone who was 65 years of age or older. The average household size was 2.14 and the average family size was 2.89.

In the village, the population was spread out, with 20.4% under the age of 18, 5.1% from 18 to 24, 40.1% from 25 to 44, 21.2% from 45 to 64, and 13.1% who were 65 years of age or older. The median age was 36 years. For every 100 females, there were 85.1 males. For every 100 females age 18 and over, there were 78.7 males.

The median income for a household in the village was $45,357, and the median income for a family was $46,250. Males had a median income of $31,719 versus $34,250 for females. The per capita income for the village was $29,732. There were 7.3% of families and 5.1% of the population living below the poverty line, including 25.0% of under eighteens and none of those over 64.
