= Snow flurry =

Light snowfall with little accumulation

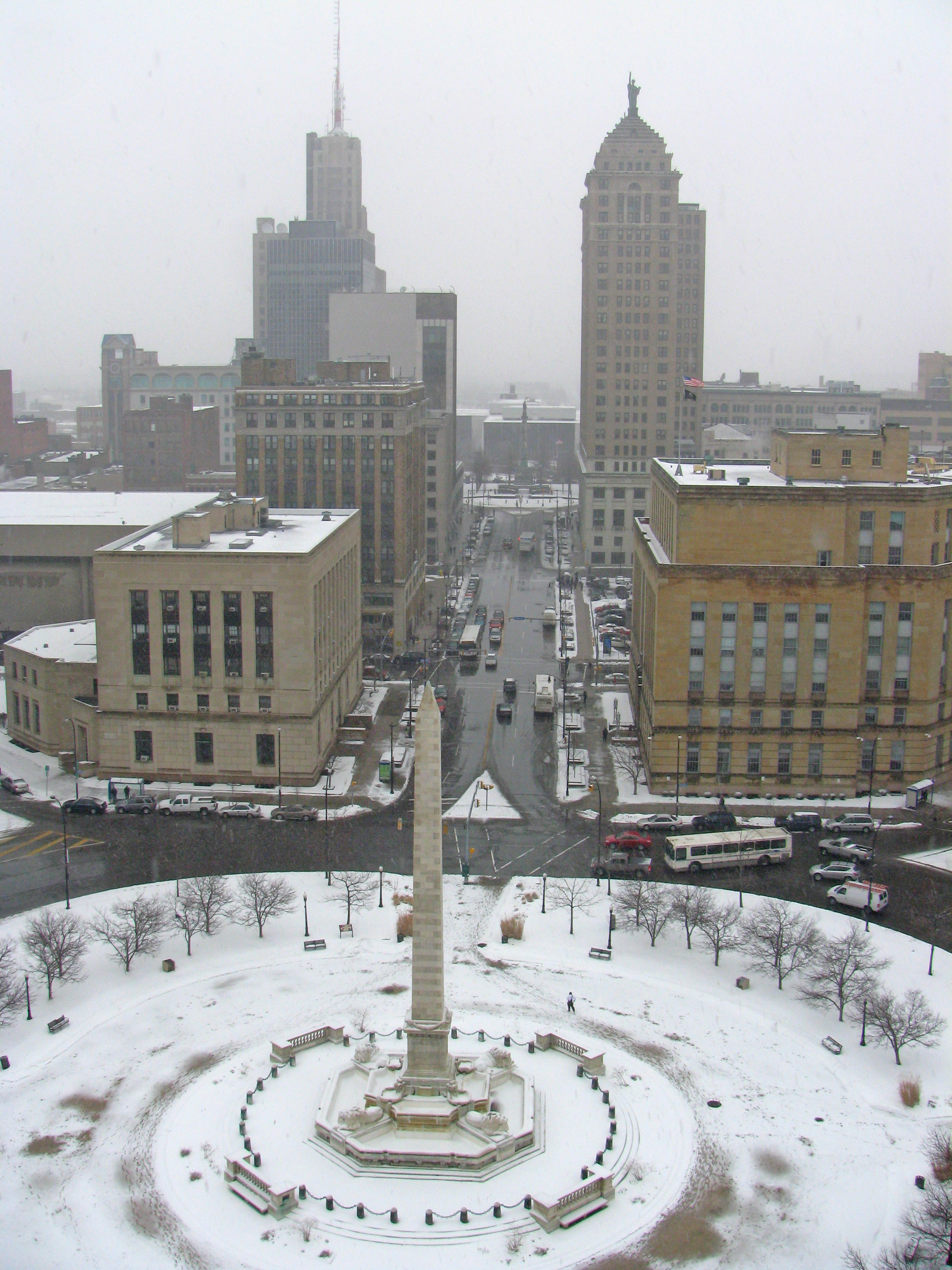
Snow flurry in Buffalo, New York

A snow flurry is a light snowfall that results in little or no snow accumulation. The US National Weather Service defines snow flurries as intermittent light snow that produces no measurable precipitation (trace amounts). In contrast, bursts of snowfall that do result in measurable snow accumulation are called snow showers. Environment Canada uses a different definition for flurries, approximately equivalent to 'snow shower'.

== See also ==
- Drizzle
