= Ritenour High School =

Public high school in Breckenridge Hills, Missouri, US

Location
- 9100 St. Charles Rock Road; Breckenridge Hills, Missouri 63114; United States; 38.7116°N 90.3570°W

Information
- School type: Public comprehensive high school
- Established: 1911
- School district: Ritenour School District
- Superintendent: Chris Kilbride
- NCES School ID: 292664001573
- Principal: Bruce Green
- Faculty: 100.35 (FTE)
- Grades: 9–12
- Enrollment: 2,033 (2023–2024)
- Student to teacher ratio: 20.26
- Campus: Suburban
- Colors: Orange and Black
- Athletics conference: Suburban Conference
- Mascot: Husky
- Rival: Pattonville High School
- Website: rhs.ritenourschools.org

Ritenour High School is a public high school in Breckenridge Hills, St. Louis County, Missouri that is part of the Ritenour School District.

The school district includes all of Breckenridge Hills, Edmundson, Overland, Sycamore Hills, and Woodson Terrace. It also includes most of most of Charlack and St. John, much of St. Ann and Vinita Park, and parts of Bridgeton.

== Activities ==
For the 2013–2014 school year, the school offered 25 activities approved by the Missouri State High School Activities Association (MSHSAA): baseball, boys and girls basketball, sideline cheerleading, boys and girls cross country, dance team, 11-man football, boys and girls golf, music activities, boys and girls soccer, softball, speech and debate, boys and girls swimming and diving, boys and girls tennis, boys and girls track and field, boys and girls volleyball, and wrestling. In addition to its MSHSAA-sanctioned activities, the school offers students an opportunity to participate in a variety of school-sponsored clubs. The school also maintains the only fully operational high school radio station in Missouri.

Ritenour students have won several state championships, including:

- Baseball: 1957, 1966, 1967
- Boys track and field: 1985, 1989
- Wrestling: 1948, 1949, 1950, 1951, 1952, 1953, 1954, 1955, 1956, 1957, 1958, 1959, 1960, 1961, 1963, 1974

Ritenour High School is one of two high schools in the St. Louis Area to operate its own functional radio station, KRHS 90.1 FM.

== Alumni ==
- Ron Hunt: Major League Baseball player
- Jerry Reuss: Major League Baseball player
- Bill Chott: actor
- Justin Hicks, Missouri state representative elected in 2022
- Wendell Bryant: NFL player
- DeRon Jenkins: NFL player
- Cal Heeter: professional hockey player
- Bob Scheffing: Major League Baseball player
