= Vinita Park, Missouri =

- City
- Location of Vinita Park, Missouri
- Coordinates: 38°41′20″N 90°20′21″W
- Country: United States
- State: Missouri
- County: St. Louis

Area
  - Total: 0.78 sq mi (2.02 km^{2})
  - Land: 0.78 sq mi (2.02 km^{2})
  - Water: 0 sq mi (0.00 km^{2})
- Elevation: 594 ft (181 m)

Population (2020)
  - Total: 1,970
  - Density: 2,527/sq mi (975.6/km^{2})
- Time zone: UTC-6 (Central (CST))
  - Summer (DST): UTC-5 (CDT)
- FIPS code: 29-76246
- GNIS feature ID: 2397148
- Website: Website from the St. Louis County website

Vinita Park is a city in St. Louis County, Missouri, United States, located just east of I-170 and south of St. Charles Rock Road. The population was 1,970 at the 2020 census.

== Geography ==
According to the United States Census Bureau, the city has a total area of 0.72 square miles (1.86 km^{2}), all land.

Charlack
Overland Unincorporated Midland township
Overland Hanley Hills
University City Pagedale
University City

== Demographics ==
Historical population
Census	Pop.	Note	%±
1950	1,801		—
1960	2,204		22.4%
1970	3,684		67.2%
1980	2,283		−38.0%
1990	2,001		−12.4%
2000	1,924		−3.8%
2010	1,880		−2.3%
2020	1,970		4.8%
U.S. Decennial Census

=== Racial and ethnic composition ===
Vinita Park, Missouri – Racial and ethnic composition Note: the US Census treats Hispanic/Latino as an ethnic category. This table excludes Latinos from the racial categories and assigns them to a separate category. Hispanics/Latinos may be of any race.
Race / Ethnicity (NH = Non-Hispanic)	Pop 2000	Pop 2010	Pop 2020	% 2000	% 2010	% 2020
White alone (NH)	626	524	469	32.54%	27.87%	23.81%
Black or African American alone (NH)	1,184	1,217	1,230	61.54%	64.73%	62.44%
Native American or Alaska Native alone (NH)	6	4	3	0.31%	0.21%	0.15%
Asian alone (NH)	21	4	19	1.09%	0.21%	0.96%
Native Hawaiian or Pacific Islander alone (NH)	0	0	0	0.00%	0.00%	0.00%
Other race alone (NH)	9	4	21	0.47%	0.21%	1.07%
Mixed race or Multiracial (NH)	49	39	73	2.55%	2.07%	3.71%
Hispanic or Latino (any race)	29	88	155	1.51%	4.68%	7.87%
Total	1,924	1,880	1,970	100.00%	100.00%	100.00%

=== 2020 census ===
As of the 2020 census, Vinita Park had a population of 1,970. The median age was 38.7 years. 20.8% of residents were under the age of 18 and 15.6% of residents were 65 years of age or older. For every 100 females there were 90.7 males, and for every 100 females age 18 and over there were 83.9 males age 18 and over.

100.0% of residents lived in urban areas, while 0.0% lived in rural areas.

There were 880 households in Vinita Park, of which 27.8% had children under the age of 18 living in them. Of all households, 27.7% were married-couple households, 22.5% were households with a male householder and no spouse or partner present, and 41.8% were households with a female householder and no spouse or partner present. About 32.5% of all households were made up of individuals and 10.0% had someone living alone who was 65 years of age or older.

There were 973 housing units, of which 9.6% were vacant. The homeowner vacancy rate was 1.8% and the rental vacancy rate was 10.1%.

=== 2010 census ===
As of the census of 2010, there were 1,880 people, 761 households, and 496 families living in the city. The population density was 2,611.1 inhabitants per square mile (1,008.2/km^{2}). There were 849 housing units at an average density of 1,179.2 per square mile (455.3/km^{2}). The racial makeup of the city was 30.1% White, 64.9% African American, 0.5% Native American, 0.2% Asian, 2.0% from other races, and 2.2% from two or more races. Hispanic or Latino of any race were 4.7% of the population.

There were 761 households, of which 33.6% had children under the age of 18 living with them, 34.0% were married couples living together, 24.6% had a female householder with no husband present, 6.6% had a male householder with no wife present, and 34.8% were non-families. 29.7% of all households were made up of individuals, and 8.1% had someone living alone who was 65 years of age or older. The average household size was 2.46 and the average family size was 3.06.

The median age in the city was 33.6 years. 24.6% of residents were under the age of 18; 9.4% were between the ages of 18 and 24; 31.2% were from 25 to 44; 24.9% were from 45 to 64; and 9.8% were 65 years of age or older. The gender makeup of the city was 48.6% male and 51.4% female.

=== 2000 census ===
As of the census of 2000, there were 1,924 people, 752 households, and 515 families living in the city. The population density was 2,628.7 inhabitants per square mile (1,014.9/km^{2}). There were 841 housing units at an average density of 1,149.0 per square mile (443.6/km^{2}). The racial makeup of the city was 61.75% African American, 33.00% White, 1.09% Asian, 0.36% Native American, 1.04% from other races, and 2.75% from two or more races. Hispanic or Latino of any race were 1.51% of the population.

There were 752 households, out of which 34.3% had children under the age of 18 living with them, 36.8% were married couples living together, 25.1% had a female householder with no husband present, and 31.4% were non-families. 26.3% of all households were made up of individuals, and 7.0% had someone living alone who was 65 years of age or older. The average household size was 2.56 and the average family size was 3.10.

In the city the population was spread out, with 29.6% under the age of 18, 9.3% from 18 to 24, 33.2% from 25 to 44, 18.0% from 45 to 64, and 9.9% who were 65 years of age or older. The median age was 31 years. For every 100 females, there were 87.3 males. For every 100 females age 18 and over, there were 80.4 males.

The median income for a household in the city was $29,482, and the median income for a family was $33,523. Males had a median income of $27,228 versus $23,951 for females. The per capita income for the city was $15,274. About 15.1% of families and 16.5% of the population were below the poverty line, including 25.0% of those under age 18 and 9.8% of those age 65 or over.

== History ==
The City of Vinita Park—along with the Village of Vinita Terrace—gets its name from "Vinita Station", an electric rail car station that was located at the intersection of Midland and Page. The Vinita Park subdivision was laid out in 1905 by A.C. Stewart and was later marketed by Everett Davis, of the Davis Realty Development Company. A map titled "Vinita Park -- "The Next Reach", by the Davis Realty Development Company, is dated 1909 and can be found in the Library of Congress. On November 3, 1941, Vinita Park was incorporated as a village, including the northern subdivisions of Spring Avenue Heights and part of Midland Heights, the Atherton (south of Page Boulevard), and the Vinita Industrial Park. On March 13, 1950, Vinita Park changed its status to a City of the 4th Class. Voters of both Vinita Park and neighboring Vinita Terrace voted on November 8, 2016, to consolidate into one municipality, to be called the City of Vinita Park. The merger took effect on May 10, 2017.

== Education ==
Vinita Park is divided between three different school districts: Normandy, Ritenour, and University City. The comprehensive high schools of these districts are Normandy, Ritenour, and University City, respectively.

Washington Elementary School, of the Normandy district, is in Vinita Park and Hanley Hills. It began operations in 1930.

Harrison Elementary School, of the Normandy district, had a Vinita Park postal address though it was not in the city limits. Lucas Crossing Elementary School, of the Normandy district, scheduled to open in 2001, took students formerly at Harrison Elementary.

St. Louis County Library operates the Indian Trails Branch in Vinita Park.

== Government ==
Vinita Park has a mayor and a board of aldermen. The mayor is elected to a four-year term and aldermen are elected to two-year terms. There are three ward divisions which each elect two alderman as required by Missouri law. Therefore, there are six aldermen in Vinita Park. If there is ever a tie vote in the board of aldermen, the mayor casts a tie-breaking vote but otherwise does not vote.

== Police department ==
On June 1, 2015, Vinita Park initiated the North County Police Cooperative. They have partnered with nearby cities, Vinita Terrace and Wellston in providing police services to their communities. The cooperative currently has 30 police officers providing police protection in the area.
