= St. John, Missouri =

- City
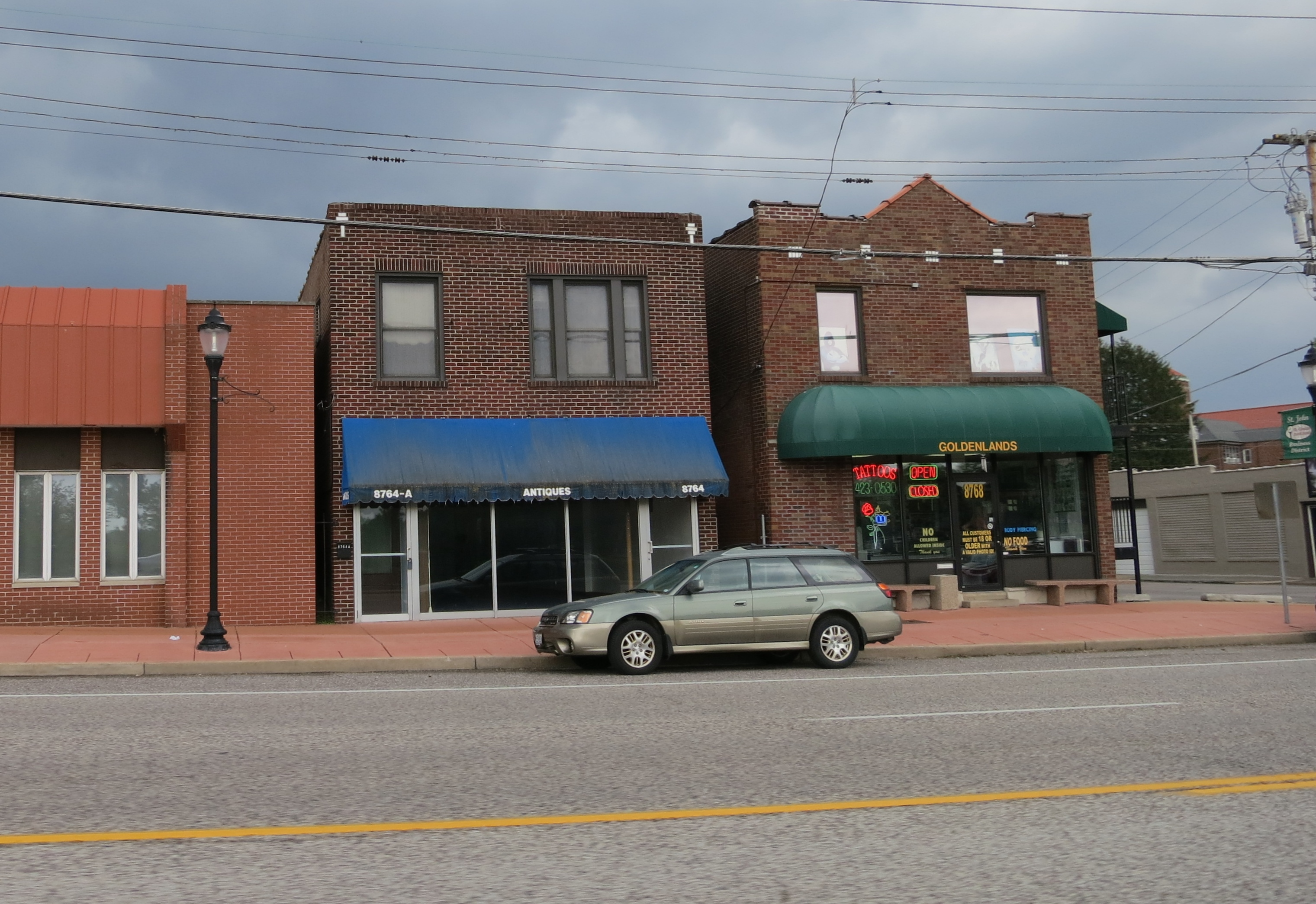
- St. Charles Rock Rd., St. John, May 2013

- Location of St. John, Missouri
- Coordinates: 38°42′53″N 90°20′47″W
- Country: United States
- State: Missouri
- County: St. Louis
- Named for: John the Apostle

Area
  - Total: 1.42 sq mi (3.69 km^{2})
  - Land: 1.42 sq mi (3.69 km^{2})
  - Water: 0 sq mi (0.00 km^{2})
- Elevation: 646 ft (197 m)

Population (2020)
  - Total: 6,643
  - Density: 4,665.2/sq mi (1,801.26/km^{2})
- Time zone: UTC-6 (Central (CST))
  - Summer (DST): UTC-5 (CDT)
- FIPS code: 29-64478
- GNIS feature ID: 2396495
- Website: www.cityofstjohn.org

St. John or Saint John is a city in St. Louis County, Missouri, United States, with its commercial district centered along St. Charles Rock Road. It is a few miles southeast of Lambert-St. Louis International Airport.

As of the 2020 census, the city population was 6,643.

== Geography ==
According to the United States Census Bureau, the city has a total area of 1.42 square miles (3.68 km^{2}), all land.

=== Adjacent communities ===
Berkeley
Woodson Terrace Berkeley
Breckenridge Hills Bel-Ridge
Overland Unincorporated Midland township
Charlack

== Demographics ==
Historical population
Census	Pop.	Note	%±
1880	149		—
1950	2,499		—
1960	7,342		193.8%
1970	8,960		22.0%
1980	7,854		−12.3%
1990	7,466		−4.9%
2000	6,871		−8.0%
2010	6,517		−5.2%
2020	6,643		1.9%
U.S. Decennial Census

=== Racial and ethnic composition ===
St. John city, Missouri – Racial and ethnic composition Note: the US Census treats Hispanic/Latino as an ethnic category. This table excludes Latinos from the racial categories and assigns them to a separate category. Hispanics/Latinos may be of any race.
Race / Ethnicity (NH = Non-Hispanic)	Pop 2000	Pop 2010	Pop 2020	% 2000	% 2010	% 2020
White alone (NH)	5,518	4,189	3,266	80.31%	64.28%	49.16%
Black or African American alone (NH)	960	1,566	2,090	13.97%	24.03%	31.46%
Native American or Alaska Native alone (NH)	16	20	17	0.23%	0.31%	0.26%
Asian alone (NH)	85	113	124	1.24%	1.73%	1.87%
Pacific Islander or Native Hawaiian alone (NH)	0	3	0	0.00%	0.05%	0.00%
Other race alone (NH)	16	12	34	0.23%	0.18%	0.51%
Mixed race or Multiracial (NH)	113	171	400	1.64%	2.62%	6.02%
Hispanic or Latino (any race)	163	443	712	2.37%	6.80%	10.72%
Total	6,871	6,517	6,643	100.00%	100.00%	100.00%

=== 2020 census ===
As of the 2020 census, St. John had a population of 6,643. The median age was 36.2 years. 23.9% of residents were under the age of 18 and 13.2% were 65 years of age or older. For every 100 females, there were 91.2 males, and for every 100 females age 18 and over, there were 86.5 males age 18 and over.

The racial makeup of the city was 50.9% White, 31.9% Black or African American, 0.4% American Indian and Alaska Native, 1.9% Asian, 0.0% Native Hawaiian and Other Pacific Islander, 6.3% from some other race, and 8.6% from two or more races. Hispanic or Latino residents of any race were 10.7% of the population.

100.0% of residents lived in urban areas, while 0.0% lived in rural areas.

There were 2,646 households in St. John, of which 31.8% had children under the age of 18 living in them. Of all households, 30.6% were married-couple households, 22.5% were households with a male householder and no spouse or partner present, and 38.1% were households with a female householder and no spouse or partner present. About 32.5% of all households were made up of individuals, and 10.5% had someone living alone who was 65 years of age or older.

There were 2,960 housing units, of which 10.6% were vacant. The homeowner vacancy rate was 3.5% and the rental vacancy rate was 11.5%.

=== 2010 census ===
As of the census of 2010, there were 6,517 people, 2,624 households, and 1,658 families living in the city. The population density was 4,589.4 inhabitants per square mile (1,772.0/km^{2}). There were 2,953 housing units at an average density of 2,079.6 per square mile (802.9/km^{2}). The racial makeup of the city was 67.4% White, 24.3% African American, 0.4% Native American, 1.8% Asian, 0.1% Pacific Islander, 2.8% from other races, and 3.3% from two or more races. Hispanic or Latino of any race were 6.8% of the population.

There were 2,624 households, of which 32.1% had children under the age of 18 living with them, 37.8% were married couples living together, 19.1% had a female householder with no husband present, 6.3% had a male householder with no wife present, and 36.8% were non-families. 30.0% of all households were made up of individuals, and 8.8% had someone living alone who was 65 years of age or older. The average household size was 2.45 and the average family size was 3.03.

The median age in the city was 36.3 years. 24.1% of residents were under the age of 18; 8.8% were between the ages of 18 and 24; 28.7% were from 25 to 44; 26.2% were from 45 to 64; and 12.3% were 65 years of age or older. The gender makeup of the city was 48.0% male and 52.0% female.

=== 2000 census ===
As of the census of 2000, there were 6,871 people, 2,774 households, and 1,767 families living in the city. The population density was 4,825.8 inhabitants per square mile (1,863.3/km^{2}). There were 2,978 housing units at an average density of 2,091.6 per square mile (807.6/km^{2}). The racial makeup of the city was 81.79% White, 13.99% African American, 1.27% Asian, 0.23% Native American, 0.77% from other races, and 1.95% from two or more races. Hispanic or Latino of any race were 2.37% of the population.

There were 2,774 households, out of which 30% had children under the age of 18 living with them, 43% were married couples living together, 16% had a female householder with no husband present, and 36.3% were non-families. 29.2% of all households were made up of individuals, and 10.7% had someone living alone who was 65 years of age or older. The average household size was 2.44 and the average family size was 3.03.

In the city, the population was spread out, with 25.2% under the age of 18, 7.8% from 18 to 24, 32.0% from 25 to 44, 19.9% from 45 to 64, and 15.1% who were 65 years of age or older. The median age was 37 years. For every 100 females, there were 91.6 males. For every 100 females age 18 and over, there were 88.2 males.

The median income for a household in the city was $37,754, and the median income for a family was $43,922. Males had a median income of $31,304 versus $25,646 for females. The per capita income for the city was $18,581. About 6.4% of families and 7.8% of the population were below the poverty line, including 9.3% of those under age 18 and 6.2% of those age 65 or over.

== Education ==
Ritenour School District includes most of St. John, while a piece is in the Normandy Schools Collaborative school district. The respective comprehensive high schools are Ritenour High School and Normandy High School.
