= Missouri Route 115 =

State highway in Missouri, U.S.

Route 115
- MO 115 highlighted in red

Route information
- Maintained by MoDOT
- Length: 10.255 mi (16.504 km)

Major junctions
- West end: I-70 in Berkeley
- I-170 in Bel-Ridge
- East end: I-70 in St. Louis

Location
- Country: United States
- State: Missouri

Highway system
- Missouri State Highway System; Interstate; US; State; Supplemental
← Route 114	→ Route 116

Route 115 is a highway in the St. Louis, Missouri area. Its western terminus is at exit 237 of Interstate 70 (I-70) in Berkeley near Lambert-St. Louis International Airport. Route 115's eastern terminus is also at I-70, at exit 248A, in St. Louis, near the McKinley Bridge. The road is locally known as Natural Bridge Road, Natural Bridge Avenue, and Salisbury Street. It is one of two Missouri Highways that has an odd-numbered designation, yet runs in an east–west direction.

== History ==
West of I-70 exit 237, the name Natural Bridge Road continues westward for two sections of road: 1.4 miles (2.25 km) as the southern service road of I-70, and 2.8 miles (4.51 km) as Route B (connected by way of Lambert International Boulevard). Prior to the construction of I-70 and several phases of expansion of Lambert Airport, Route 115 continued west as far as St. Charles, which included a portion of Natural Bridge Road in Bridgeton which has been significantly impacted by recent airport expansion. Portions of the same right-of-way exist as a section of St. Charles Rock Road (which is now Route 180) west of I-270. This route was once part of Route 115.

After the Discovery Bridge on the eastern portion of Route 370 opened in 1992, the portions of Route 115 west of the airport were removed from the state highway system. In 1998, the former Route 115 bridge across the Missouri River was demolished.

== Major intersections ==
County	Location	mi	km	Destinations	Notes
St. Louis	Berkeley	0.000	0.000	I-70 – Airport	Exit 237 on I-70
St. Louis	Berkeley	0.208	0.335	Natural Bridge Road west	Continuation beyond I-70
St. Louis	Bel-Ridge	1.417	2.280	I-170 to I-70 east	Exit 6 on I-170
St. Louis	Normandy	3.740	6.019	Route N north (Florissant Road)	Southern terminus of Route N
St. Louis	Northwoods	4.014	6.460	Route U (Lucas–Hunt Road)	
City of St. Louis		6.847	11.019	Kingshighway Boulevard	
City of St. Louis		9.017	14.511	Grand Boulevard	
City of St. Louis		10.225	16.456	I-70 / McKinley Street to McKinley Bridge / IL 3	Exit 248A on I-70
1.000 mi = 1.609 km; 1.000 km = 0.621 mi

== See also ==
- Old St. Charles Bridge
- McKinley Bridge
