= Ritenour School District =

School district in Missouri, US

Location
- 2420 Woodson Road St. Louis, MO 63114 United States

District information
- Motto: Every Student, Every Day
- Established: 1846
- Superintendent: Dr. Christopher Kilbride
- Schools: 10
- Budget: $71,255,000 (2015-16)
- NCES District ID: 1931680

Students and staff
- Students: 6449 (2018-19)
- Teachers: 386.36 FTE
- Staff: 251.60 FTE
- Student–teacher ratio: 16.69
- Athletic conference: Suburban XII
- District mascot: Huskies
- Colors: Orange and Black

Other information
- Website: www.ritenourschools.org

Ritenour School District is a school district located in St. Louis County, Missouri. For the 2016-2017 school year, RSD served 6,289 students.

The school district includes all of Breckenridge Hills, Edmundson, Overland, Sycamore Hills, and Woodson Terrace. It also includes most of most of Charlack and St. John, much of St. Ann and Vinita Park, and parts of Bridgeton.

== History ==
Ritenour School District was founded in 1846, and in 1867, it became the first school district in the St. Louis Metropolitan Area to serve African American students when it was founded. In 1913, Ritenour started educating African Americans in a separate high school as well. In 1968, RSD was a fully integrated school district teaching white and black students in the same schools. In 1981, RSD accepted a St. Louis Court issued desegregation plan and transported 50 inner city students to be educated at RSD schools. The current headquarters of Ritenour School district is located at the location of where the first school was founded. RSD's operating budget in the 2013-2014 was $66,115,000 while its expenditures was $66,965,000 equating to more than 10,000 dollars spent per student.

== Demographics ==
The student body for the 2016-2017 school year was 40% African American, 32% Caucasian, 18% Hispanic, 3% Asian and 7% Other/Multiracial. About 800 students in the district are English Language Learners prompting RSD to start Adult ESL classes and creating an inclusive environment for foreign students by having international cuisine events and hiring more teachers capable of handling students learning English.

== Academics ==
The average ACT score is 18. 48% of students matriculate to college.

== Schools ==
=== Pre-K ===
- Ritenour Early Childhood Center

=== Elementary schools ===
- Buder Elementary
- Iveland Elementary
- Kratz Elementary
- Marion Elementary
- Marvin Elementary
- Wyland Elementary

=== Middle schools ===
- Hoech Middle
- Ritenour Middle

=== High schools ===
- Ritenour Senior High
