= St. Charles Rock Road =

Arterial road in St. Louis County, Missouri, USA

- Former names: St. Charles Street, St. Charles Road
- Part of: Route 180
- Owner: City of Bridgeton and State of Missouri
- Maintained by: City of Bridgeton Public Works Department, Street Maintenance Division and MoDOT
- Length: 12.1 mi (19.5 km)
- Location: Bridgeton–Wellston, Missouri, United States
- Nearest metro station: Rock Road
- West end: Missouri Bottom Road in Bridgeton
- Major junctions: Route 141 in Bridgeton; I-270 in Bridgeton; I-70 in Bridgeton; US 67 in Bridgeton; I-170 in Charlack
- East end: Route 180 / Route U in Wellston

Construction
- Completion: 1815

St. Charles Rock Road is the current name of what was the first road to traverse present-day St. Louis County, Missouri, United States, between St. Louis City and St. Charles. For most of its length it is also known as Route 180.

== Route description ==
Its present-day origin is at the border of the cities of Wellston (to the east) and Pagedale, starting as a co-signed road with pre-existing Route 180 at a T intersection with Lucas-Hunt Road. Route 180, up to this transition point, is co-signed with Dr. Martin Luther King Drive, from Route 180's eastern terminus in St. Louis' Kingsway East neighborhood; Dr. Martin Luther King Drive originates farther east than Route 180, where the Martin Luther King Bridge crosses the Mississippi River into central St. Louis. St. Charles Rock Road/Route 180 proceeds northwest past several cemeteries, crosses under I-170 within St. John, then continues through Breckenridge Hills and St. Ann. As it enters Bridgeton, it crosses over I-70 and then under I-270. From I-270 it continues northwest towards the banks of the Missouri River, ending opposite St. Charles at Missouri Bottom Road.

== History ==
In the 1760s, St. Louis (on the Mississippi River) and St. Charles (on the Missouri) were the two major European settlements in the lower Missouri River Valley. A path between the two came to be known as King’s Highway, a name used in colonial times by the Spanish and then the French for many frequently used roads. The southeastern end of the road became known as St. Charles Street.

On May 20, 1804, Capt. Meriwether Lewis reached St. Charles, the expedition's last "civilized" stop, via St. Charles Rock Road to meet up with Lt. William Clark. The Lewis and Clark Expedition then officially began with 40 to 50 men – the precise number is unknown.

In 1819, St. Charles Road was established as a post road and stagecoach road; by 1837 it became a turnpike. The road furnished access to the Santa Fe Trail and Oregon Trail for the many westbound wagon trains that were outfitted in St. Louis. After passage of the Missouri Plank Road Law in 1851, it became an oak plank road. In 1865, St. Charles Road was rebuilt with macadam and renamed St. Charles Rock Road. In 1921, it became the first concrete state highway in St. Louis County. In 1953, St. Charles Rock Road was completed as a divided two-lane highway along much of its length.

== Transportation ==
A major influence in the route's location today was construction of an electric interurban railway, the St. Louis, St. Charles and Western Railway, west from Easton Avenue (which had been St. Charles Road and became Dr. Martin Luther King Drive) and Hodiamont, in stages, to St. Charles. From Wellston to the current location of Lindbergh Boulevard the line ran in a straight shot while the road meandered around St. John and Breckenridge Hills. Eventually the road was relocated to adjoin the streetcar line, which ran to its north. Many portions of the original road are now side streets in the area. Running west, streetcar line diverged from the Rock Road at the present location of Lindbergh and headed northwest for Bridgeton, which brought it just west of where the Rock Road swung south away from its present route to join Fee Fee Creek and head west. The route was winding, the creek prone to flooding but the land acquisition was easiest along the Creek. When the interurban line stopped running in the 1930s, the Road Rock was reconstructed on the railroad right-of-way for a direct shot into St. Charles. The former route was named Old St. Charles Rock Road, now Boenker Road. Today, a portion of the streetcar right-of-way, complete with poles, has survived intact on the south side of the Rock Road just east of Earth City Expressway.
