= St. Ann, Missouri =

City in St. Louis County, Missouri, United States

- City
- City of St. Ann
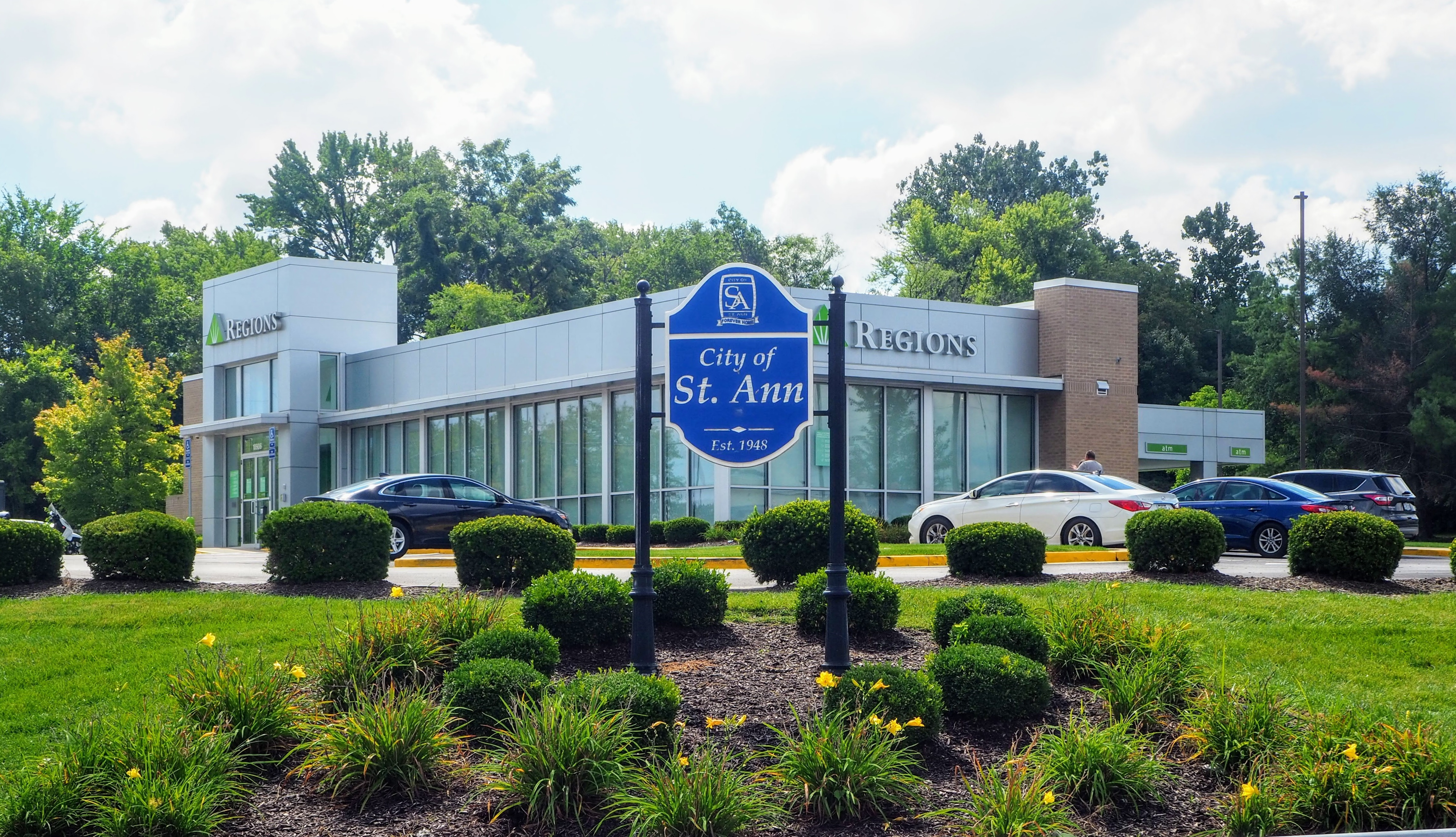
- Entrance to St. Ann Along East Bound St. Charles Rock Road (MO Route 180)

- Location of St. Ann, Missouri
- Coordinates: 38°43′36″N 90°23′14″W
- Country: United States
- State: Missouri
- County: St. Louis

Government
  - Mayor: Amy M. Poelker

Area
  - Total: 3.15 sq mi (8.17 km^{2})
  - Land: 3.15 sq mi (8.17 km^{2})
  - Water: 0 sq mi (0.00 km^{2})
- Elevation: 594 ft (181 m)

Population (2020)
  - Total: 13,019
  - Density: 4,126.2/sq mi (1,593.13/km^{2})
- Time zone: UTC-6 (Central (CST))
  - Summer (DST): UTC-5 (CDT)
- ZIP code: 63074
- Area code: 314
- FIPS code: 29-63956
- GNIS feature ID: 2396469
- Website: City of St. Ann official website

St. Ann or Saint Ann is a city in northwest St. Louis County, Missouri, United States. The population was 13,019 at the 2020 census.

== History ==
The city was established in 1948 but began to develop six years before it was granted the petition of incorporation. Charles F. Vatterott, the developer and builder of most of the residential and commercial properties in St. Ann, started the community as a housing project for families of workers employed in nearby defense plants. It was one of the few defense housing projects in the country to develop into a permanent town. The original homesite was dedicated in honor of Saint Ann, the mother of the Virgin Mary.

== Geography ==
St. Ann is located in the north-central part of the St. Louis area. St. Ann also borders Lambert-St. Louis International Airport. Municipal neighbors to St. Ann are Bridgeton, Edmundson, Woodson Terrace, Breckenridge Hills, Overland, and a large portion of unincorporated St. Louis County that lies between Maryland Heights and Creve Coeur.

According to the United States Census Bureau, the city has a total area of 3.18 square miles (8.24 km^{2}), all land.

== Demographics ==
=== Racial and ethnic composition ===
St. Ann city, Missouri – Racial and ethnic composition Note: the US Census treats Hispanic/Latino as an ethnic category. This table excludes Latinos from the racial categories and assigns them to a separate category. Hispanics/Latinos may be of any race.
Race / Ethnicity (NH = Non-Hispanic)	Pop 2000	Pop 2010	Pop 2020	% 2000	% 2010	% 2020
White alone (NH)	10,974	8,768	7,027	80.65%	67.34%	53.97%
Black or African American alone (NH)	1,529	2,846	3,806	11.24%	21.86%	29.23%
Native American or Alaska Native alone (NH)	35	34	43	0.26%	0.26%	0.33%
Asian alone (NH)	267	286	361	1.96%	2.20%	2.77%
Native Hawaiian or Pacific Islander alone (NH)	2	1	7	0.01%	0.01%	0.05%
Other race alone (NH)	30	32	103	0.22%	0.25%	0.79%
Mixed race or Multiracial (NH)	210	308	770	1.54%	2.37%	5.91%
Hispanic or Latino (any race)	560	745	902	4.12%	5.72%	6.93%
Total	13,607	13,020	13,019	100.00%	100.00%	100.00%

Historical population
Census	Pop.	Note	%±
1950	4,557		—
1960	12,155		166.7%
1970	18,215		49.9%
1980	15,523		−14.8%
1990	14,489		−6.7%
2000	13,607		−6.1%
2010	13,020		−4.3%
2020	13,019		0.0%
U.S. Decennial Census

=== 2020 census ===
As of the 2020 census, St. Ann had a population of 13,019. The median age was 37.9 years. 21.3% of residents were under the age of 18 and 14.8% of residents were 65 years of age or older. For every 100 females there were 88.8 males, and for every 100 females age 18 and over there were 85.9 males age 18 and over.

100.0% of residents lived in urban areas, while 0.0% lived in rural areas.

There were 6,018 households in St. Ann, of which 26.4% had children under the age of 18 living in them. Of all households, 27.2% were married-couple households, 25.1% were households with a male householder and no spouse or partner present, and 39.1% were households with a female householder and no spouse or partner present. About 40.3% of all households were made up of individuals and 13.1% had someone living alone who was 65 years of age or older. The city had 3,344 families.

There were 6,514 housing units, of which 7.6% were vacant. The homeowner vacancy rate was 1.4% and the rental vacancy rate was 6.9%.

=== Income and poverty ===
The 2016–2020 5-year American Community Survey estimates show that the median household income was $47,994 (with a margin of error of +/- $4,287) and the median family income was $60,712 (+/- $2,520). Males had a median income of $32,585 (+/- $6,794) versus $27,965 (+/- $3,058) for females. The median income for those above 16 years old was $29,691 (+/- $3,459). Approximately, 10.0% of families and 11.1% of the population were below the poverty line, including 21.6% of those under the age of 18 and 7.4% of those ages 65 or over.

=== 2010 census ===
At the 2010 census there were 13,020 people, 5,894 households, and 3,259 families living in the city. The population density was 4,094.3 inhabitants per square mile (1,580.8/km^{2}). There were 6,496 housing units at an average density of 2,042.8 per square mile (788.7/km^{2}). The racial makeup of the city was 69.5% White, 22.1% African American, 0.3% Native American, 2.2% Asian, 3.0% from other races, and 2.8% from two or more races. Hispanic or Latino of any race were 5.7%.

Of the 5,894 households 28.3% had children under the age of 18 living with them, 31.6% were married couples living together, 17.9% had a female householder with no husband present, 5.8% had a male householder with no wife present, and 44.7% were non-families. 38.4% of households were one person and 12% were one person aged 65 or older. The average household size was 2.21 and the average family size was 2.93.

The median age was 37.1 years. 22.4% of residents were under the age of 18; 9.2% were between the ages of 18 and 24; 28% were from 25 to 44; 27.4% were from 45 to 64; and 13% were 65 or older. The gender makeup of the city was 47.5% male and 52.5% female.

=== 2000 census ===
At the 2000 census there were 13,607 people, 6,190 households, and 3,447 families living in the city. The population density was 4,352.8 inhabitants per square mile (1,680.6/km^{2}). There were 6,554 housing units at an average density of 2,096.6 per square mile (809.5/km^{2}). The racial makeup of the city was 82.71% White, 11.44% African American, 0.28% Native American, 1.99% Asian, 0.01% Pacific Islander, 1.79% from other races, and 1.78% from two or more races. Hispanic or Latino of any race were 4.12%.

Of the 6,190 households 25.8% had children under the age of 18 living with them, 37.4% were married couples living together, 14.3% had a female householder with no husband present, and 44.3% were non-families. 37.3% of households were one person and 13.2% were one person aged 65 or older. The average household size was 2.19 and the average family size was 2.90.

The age distribution was 22.3% under the age of 18, 9.5% from 18 to 24, 31.8% from 25 to 44, 20.2% from 45 to 64, and 16.2% 65 or older. The median age was 37 years. For every 100 females, there were 93.5 males. For every 100 females age 18 and over, there were 87.8 males.

The median household income was $32,351 and the median family income was $41,135. Males had a median income of $31,091 versus $24,064 for females. The per capita income for the city was $18,318. About 10.4% of families and 12.8% of the population were below the poverty line, including 19.0% of those under age 18 and 6.8% of those age 65 or over.

== Education ==
The city is served by two school districts, Pattonville School District and Ritenour School District.

St. Louis County Library operates the Rock Road Branch in St. Ann.

== Business ==
Northwest Plaza, the largest enclosed shopping mall in Missouri, was located in St. Ann. However, the mall was closed in October 2010. At its peak, the mall contained 9 anchor stores and 210 smaller stores. Northwest Plaza was mostly demolished in 2013 to make way for the Crossings at Northwest a mixed-use retail and office project. Menard's Home Improvement Stores opened a 150,000SF store in August 2015, their 4th store in the St. Louis Metro Area at the Crossings. Charter Communications leased 135,000SF of an old Macy's Department Store and renovated it into a call/technology center that employs over a 1,000 employees. Save-a-Lot Corporation maintains its corporate headquarters at the Crossings at Northwest.

== City Services ==
Parks & Recreation - The city maintains a 50,000 SF Community Center, 34-par, 9-hole golf course on 55 acres (220,000 m^{2}) The city's six parks are Tiemeyer, Livingston & Wright, Buder, St. Ann, Schafer and Mary Ridge. The city is currently building a multi-million dollar outdoor state-of-the-art outdoor Aquatic Center in Tiemeyer Park to replace a pool that was built in 1988.

Public Services - The city's Public Services Department consists of the Building & Zoning Divisions and Street Maintenance. The Street Maintenance Division oversees 42 miles of City maintained streets and administers an annual street maintenance capital improvement program with an annual budget of over $1,000,000.

Police - The city maintains its own municipal police department consisting of 47 sworn officers and 17 civilian employees. The department is certified as a through the Commission on Accreditation for Law Enforcement Agencies (CALEA) The department provides 911 Dispatching Services through the North Central Dispatch Cooperative to multiple neighboring police agencies under contract. North Central Dispatch is also certified through CALEA's Public Safety Communications Accreditation Program and is one of only two municipal police dispatch centers in the entire State of Missouri to be Certified through CALEA. The department has a close working relationship with the two public school districts (Ritenour and Pattonville) that serve St. Ann and places School Resource Officers in all public schools in St. Ann as well as Ritenour High School.

== See also ==
- List of cities in Missouri
- Murder of Angie Housman
