= Murder of Angie Housman =

1993 child murder in Missouri, United States

The murder of Angie Housman was a long-running crime investigation spanning more than 26 years. Angie Housman was a nine-year old student who disappeared from her home town on November 18, 1993. Her dead body was found eight days later. In 2019, DNA evidence led to the arrest and conviction of Earl Cox for her kidnapping, sexual assault and murder.

== Angie Housman ==
Angela Marie Housman
- Born: February 18, 1984; St. Louis, Missouri, U.S.
- Disappeared: November 18, 1993
- Died: November 27, 1993 (aged 9); St. Charles County, Missouri, U.S.

Angela Marie Housman, called Angie, was born on February 18, 1984 in St. Louis, Missouri, to Diane M. Housman and Angelo D’Andrea. Her parents separated some time after her birth and her mother married another man, Ronald Walter Bone Sr., who would become her step father. The couple would eventually have three sons.

At the time of her disappearance, Housman was 9 years old and lived with her mother, step father and a two year old half brother in St. Ann, Missouri. She attended the 4th grade at Buder Elementary School in the Ritenour School District. A neighbor, where Housman often used to play after school, described her as "just a happy-go-lucky little girl".

== Disappearance and investigation ==
Key locations relevant to the murder.
1 Housman's home
2 Bus stop
3 Location of Housman's body
4 Home associated with Cox

Housman was last seen alive at around 4:00 p.m. on November 18, 1993, when she got off the school bus and set off for home. According to reports, a woman would usually watch the children as they left the bus and make sure they arrived home safely. However, on that day, the woman was not there. Although her parents' duplex was only half a block away, she never made it there.

The St. Ann Police Department was notified of her disappearance on the same day at 7:10 p.m. and large scale search efforts began. When she could not be located after four days of searching, the Major case squad of Greater St. Louis was contacted. In the following days, hundreds of volunteers helped police in the search.

Her body was eventually located on November 27, nine days after her disappearance, at approximately 10:30 a.m., by a hunter in the Busch Wildlife Area in St. Charles County. When she was found, she was tied to a tree and her partially nude body was covered with snow. In addition, she was gagged with her own underwear and her eyes and mouth were taped shut with duct tape.

The forensic examination revealed that she had died only a few hours before she was found. During the days she was missing, she had endured prolonged sexual assault. In addition, her body showed signs of physical abuse, dehydration, and starvation. Her ultimate cause of death, however, was determined to be hypothermia, due to being exposed to low temperatures for several hours.

Although ultimately unrelated, the disappearance of a 10-year-old girl, Cassidy Senter, the following month caused great concern in the community. Schools in the St. Louis area would for instance institute buddy systems to make sure children would not walk alone. Police were able to recover a fingerprint from the duct tape that was used to restrain her. They also investigated thousands of tips from the public. However, none of the investigative leads were successful and the case remained unsolved for more than 25 years.

== Arrest and trial ==
It was not until 2019, that progress in forensic science led to the identification of the perpetrator. Investigators were able to derive a DNA profile from Housman's clothing, which had been stored back in 1993. This DNA profile matched a sample in the CODIS database, prompting authorities to identify a man they had not previously suspected: Earl Webster Cox.

By the time the authorities finally linked Cox to Housman's murder, he already had an extensive criminal record. In the 1970s, he served in the US Air Force, but in 1982 he was court-martialed for sexually abusing four minors and dishonorably discharged. As a result of the accusations, he served several years in prison. After he was released on parole, he was soon accused again of inappropriate contact with children and sent back to prison in 1991. He was released again in December 1992. When he committed the kidnapping, assault and murder of Housman in November 1993, he was 39 years old and lived in Ferguson, Missouri. His sister, however, lived close to the bus stop, where Housman disappeared from. In 2003, he was arrested again during an FBI sting operation for solicitation of a minor. In the ensuing investigation, it turned out that he was involved in an international child pornography ring. The operation led to the arrest of 60 people in 11 countries in total. Cox was sentenced to ten years in prison. After serving his prison sentence, however, he was declared too dangerous to be released and kept in a North Carolina federal prison under the Adam Walsh Act.

In June 2019, the St. Charles County Prosecuting Attorney's Office opened their case against Cox. He was charged by Prosecutor Tim Lohmar with first-degree murder, first-degree kidnapping and sodomy in the case of Angie Housman. During the trial, Cox accepted a plea agreement, where he admitted guilt to first-degree murder and child molestation in return for avoiding the death penalty. He was indicted by a St. Charles County grand jury in October 2019 and sentenced to life in prison without the possibility of parole. In December 2024, Earl Cox died in prison of natural causes at age 67.
