= Sexual abuse scandal in the Roman Catholic Archdiocese of Saint Louis =

Clergy abuse scandal in Saint Louis, United States

The sexual abuse scandal in the Roman Catholic Archdiocese of Saint Louis was part of the large abuse scandal in the United States during the late 20th and early 21st centuries. The Archdiocese of Saint Louis is located in the State of Missouri.

An investigation by the State of Missouri in 2019 found accusations of sexual abuse against 163 clerics over the past several decades and recommended the prosecution of 12 individuals. At least nine priests and one religious brother were convicted of sexual abuse crimes in the archdiocese. The charges included possession of child pornography, sodomy and sexual assault to rape. The sentences for these crimes ranged from probation to ten years in prison. The male victims ranged in age from 11 to 14.

== Actions by Archdiocese of St. Louis ==
Archbishop Robert Carlson in August 2018 announced that the archdiocese was voluntarily opening all of its personnel files on priests to the Missouri attorney general for his investigation of sexual abuse in the Catholic dioceses in the state. This was in response to the Pennsylvania Grand Jury Report of sexual abuse in that state, released that same month. In July 2019, the archdiocese released the names of 64 clergy who were credibly accused of committing acts of sexual abuse.

In July 2024, 25 alleged victims of sexual abuse by clerics sued the archdiocese, stating that its leadership knew about rampant incidents of sexual abuse over the past several decades.

== Actions by State of Missouri ==
In September 2019, Missouri Attorney General Eric Schmitt released a report on the sexual abuse of children within the four Catholic dioceses of Missouri. Schmitt found accusations of sexual abuse against 163 clerics across the state and recommended the criminal prosecution of 12 of them. The investigation was base on diocesan personnel files along with reports from over 100 victims.

== Sexual abuse convictions ==
=== Reverend James T. Beighlie ===
In 2021, Beighlie, a member of the Congregation of the Mission religious order, was assigned as an assistant pastor at St. Vincent de Paul Parish in St. Louis. In May 2021, staff at the Congregation office in St. Louis found printouts of nude pictures of him at their printer. A police search of Beighlie's electronic devices found 6,200 images of child pornography. He pleaded guilty in October 2022 to two counts of possession of child pornography. He was sentenced in January 2023 to five years in prison and $4,750 in restitution to a victim in one of the images.

=== Brother Felix Bland ===
The DeLasalle Brothers, an organization of lay brothers, was operating the LaSalle Institute in Wildwood, a residential school for delinquent boys. While serving as a counselor there in 1988, Bland sexually assaulted an 11-year-old boy. A few years later, the victim reported the assault, but by that time Bland was serving in Africa.

When Bland returned to the United States in 1995, police asked the first victim to set up a meeting with him. With the victim wearing a recording device, Bland implicated himself. That same year, Bland pleaded guilty of six counts of statutory sodomy. He was sentenced to 15 years in prison, but 14 years of the sentence were suspended. The judge also allowed Bland to participate in a work release program, only spending nights in jail. In 1997, the archdiocese settled a lawsuit by a family with two other boys who had also been abused by Bland.

=== Reverend James A Funke ===
In 1986, Funke was an assistant pastor at St. Bernadette Parish in Lemay and a biology teacher at Bishop DuBourg High School in St. Louis. That year, he established a sexual relationship with Stephen Hippe, a 16-year-old boy at the parish. Funke gave him money for a car, beer and other gifts. In October, after discovering the abuse, Hippe's mother, Mary Ellen Kruger, contacted police. Funke was arrested and charged with sexual assault. While searching his residence, police uncovered child pornography. By the time of his trial, a second victim had come forward and Funke received more charges. In April 1987, he pleaded guilty to ten counts of second-degree deviate sexual assault of the two boys and was sentenced to ten years in prison. Hippe, unable to recover from the abuse, committed suicide in 1991. The archdiocese paid a financial settlement to Funke's victims in July 2008.

=== Reverend James Patrick Grady ===
In 1999, Grady was assigned as a pastor at Holy Innocents Parish in St. Louis. During that period, he was alleged to have sexually assaulted a young girl in the special education program run by the parish school.

Grady, a pastor in July 2009 at St. Raphael the Archangel Parish in St. Louis, answered a Craigslist ad that offered massages and other services from underage girls. He set up a meeting with a 16-year-girl at her house. Arriving at the location, Grady suspected a police sting operation and tried to walk away, but was arrested. He was charged with attempting to obtain a minor for a commercial sex act. A charge of processing child pornography was added in November 2009. In March 2010, Grady pleaded guilty to a child pornography charge and admitted to soliciting sex from a minor. He was sentenced in June 2010 to 6.7 years in prison.

In August 2024, the alleged victim from Holy Innocents sued the diocese, claiming sexual abuse by Grady. She also said that she had been abused by a Sister Annette, but this individual could not be identified.

=== Reverend Donald Henry Heck ===
In October 1990, while serving as a pastor at Our Lady Queen of Peace Parish in House Springs, Heck sexually assaulted an 11-year-old boy. The assault took place in the church sacristy after a mass. Without knowing about this incident, the archdiocese removed him a few days later from Our Lady due to a previous abuse allegation. Heck was sent for treatment to St. Michael's Center, a spiritual healing center in St. Louis. In March 1991, while Heck was at St. Michael's, he revealed the assault from October; the archdiocese immediately notified police.

Heck was indicted in November 1991 on one charge of charge of first-degree sexual abuse. In May 1992, Heck entered an Alford plea in court and was sentenced in August 1992 to four years in prison.

=== Reverend John P. Hess ===
In March 2002, the FBI was conducting Operation Candyman, a national campaign against child pornography. That month, the FBI seized Hess' computer at the rectory of Most Sacred Heart Parish in Florissant, where he was serving as pastor. A search of the computer hard drive found child pornography. However, a false statement in the search warrant used by the FBI prevented prosecutors from charging Hess with possession of child pornography. Instead, Hess pleaded guilty in February 2003 to possession of obscene materials, a lesser charge, and was sentenced to probation and three months in a halfway house.

=== Reverend Bryan M. Kuchar ===
Kuchar in 1995 was serving as an associate pastor at Assumption Parish in Mattese. During a six-month period that year, he sexually assaulted a 14-year-old boy from the parish school while acting as his tutor. The victim told his parents about it when he was in drug treatment in 1997, but they did not notify police. Between 1999 and 2002, Kuchar worked at an overnight camp at Kenrick Glennon Seminary in Shrewsbury. During that time, he assaulted a young teenage boy on multiple occasions. The victim committed suicide at age 21.

In 2002, the victim from Assumption Parish finally reported his assault to police. Kuchar, now an associate director of the Vocations Office for the archdiocese, was indicted in April 2002 on six counts of second-degree statutory sodomy. The victim sued the archdiocese in July 2002. In May 2003, Kuchar's trial ended in a hung jury, despite his having confessed to police. In a second trial in September 2003, Kuchar was convicted on three counts of statutory sodomy. He was sentenced to three years in prison.

Kuchar's sexual abuse victim from Assumption Parish received a financial settlement from the archdiocese in August 2004. In May 2013, the parents of the victim from Kenrick-Glennon sued the archdiocese.

=== Reverend Joseph D. Ross ===
In 1972, while serving at Immacolata Parish in Richmond Heights, police arrested Ross after they found him masturbating with two other men in a department store restroom. By 1975, he was serving as a teacher at St. Williams School in Woodson Terrace. Matthew Layton, a student at St. Williams, said that Ross started grooming him in 1975 and sodomized him in 1977 in a closet.

Ross in 1988 was serving as a pastor at Christ the King Parish in University City when a boy accused him of sexual molestation. In December 1986, when the victim was 11-years-old, Ross kissed the boy several times and tried to pull him onto his lap. During the police interrogation, Ross volunteered that he was accused of molesting a boy in 1977 and that he was arrested during the 1970s for propositioning a policeman in a restroom.

Ross in 1988 pleaded guilty to misdemeanor sexual abuse and was sentenced to probation. Bishop John L. May then sent Ross to Washington, D.C. for seven months of treatment. In 1991, May assigned Ross to St. Cronan Parish in St. Louis without informing the parish about his criminal record. In March 2002, after updating its policy on sexual abuse, Archbishop Justin Rigali removed Ross from St. Cronan. The Vatican laicized Ross in August 2002. Layton sued the archdiocese in November 2002 after reading about the Christ the King case in the newspaper. Ross was arrested in Arkansas in October 2008 on eleven counts of statutory rape, statutory sodomy and child molestation for allegedly abusing a child at St. Cronan, but they were all dismissed in August 2010.

=== Reverend William “Bill” Vatterott ===
One former altar boy says he was sexually abused between 2008 and 2011 by Reverend William Vatterott, who was later convicted of possession of child pornography. After serving 3 years in prison, he returned to St. Louis and was married. Vatterott was named by at least one victim of clergy sexual abuse in a 2024 suit against the archdiocese. He was arrested again in September 2026 for parole violations.

=== Reverend Gary Wolken ===
In June 2023, the archdiocese agreed to pay $1 million to settle a lawsuit by a man who alleged he was raped when an altar boy from fourth through sixth grade by a since-defrocked priest who has been required to register as a sex offender. In 2004, the Archdiocese of St. Louis paid $1.7 million to settle sexual abuse claims.

== See also ==
- Archdiocese of St. Louis
- Sexual abuse
