= Bob Scheffing =

American baseball player, coach, and manager (1913–1985)

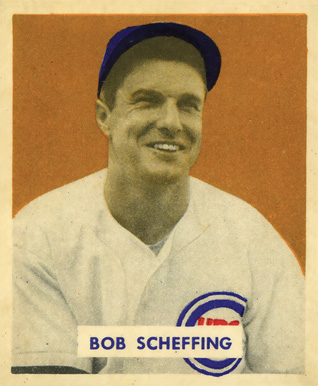
- Catcher / Manager
- Born: August 11, 1913; Overland, Missouri, U.S.
- Died: October 26, 1985 (aged 72); Phoenix, Arizona, U.S.
- Batted: Right Threw: Right

MLB debut
- April 27, 1941, for the Chicago Cubs

Last MLB appearance
- September 11, 1951, for the St. Louis Cardinals

MLB statistics
- Batting average: .263
- Home runs: 20
- Runs batted in: 187
- Games managed: 849
- Managerial record: 418–427
- Winning %: .495
- Stats at Baseball Reference

Teams
- As player: Chicago Cubs (1941–1942, 1946–1950); Cincinnati Reds (1950–1951); St. Louis Cardinals (1951); As manager: Chicago Cubs (1957–1959); Detroit Tigers (1961–1963)

Robert Boden Scheffing (August 11, 1913 – October 26, 1985) was an American professional baseball player, coach, manager and front-office executive. Nicknamed "Grumpy", the native of Overland, Missouri, is most often identified with the Chicago Cubs, for whom he played as a catcher (1941–42, 1946–50), coached (1954–55), and managed (1957–59). Scheffing threw and batted right-handed; he was listed as 6 feet 2 inches (1.88 m) tall and 180 pounds (82 kg).

== Playing career ==
He started playing baseball at Ritenour High School. His professional career began in 1935 in the St. Louis Cardinals' farm system, but he was unable to crack the Major Leagues until he was selected by the Cubs in the 1940 Rule 5 draft. En route, he spent the 1939 season as the 25-year-old playing manager of the Washington Red Birds of the Class D Pennsylvania State Association. He also served in the United States Navy between 1943 and 1945 in World War II's Pacific Theatre.

Over the course of his eight-year MLB playing career, Scheffing batted .263 with 357 hits in 517 games with the Cubs, Cincinnati Reds (1950–51) and Cardinals (1951).

== Manager of Cubs and Tigers ==
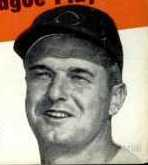
Scheffing with the Cubs, circa 1957

As a full-time manager, Scheffing led the Los Angeles Angels of the Pacific Coast League to 107 victories and the 1956 PCL championship, and was promoted to skipper of the parent Cubs the following season. In three full years at the Cubs' helm, Scheffing compiled a 208–254 (.450) record. His 1957 team finished 62–92 and tied for seventh place in the eight-team National League, but his 1958 and 1959 clubs won 72 and 74 games respectively and finished tied for fifth place each season.

Scheffing also spent 21/2 years (1961–June 16, 1963) as manager of the Detroit Tigers. Taking over a sixth-place team, he led the 1961 Tigers to 101 victories and second place in the American League. Although the Tigers eventually finished eight games out of first place, they led the league until July 25 and battled the world champion New York Yankees for the pennant until a devastating three-game sweep at Yankee Stadium in early September. The 1962 Tigers, handicapped by Al Kaline's prolonged absence due to a broken collarbone, won 16 fewer games than 1961's team, and finished fourth. Then the 1963 club got off to a poor start (24–36) and was in ninth place in the ten-team league when Scheffing was replaced on June 18 by Chuck Dressen. Although Scheffing's mark with the Tigers was 210–173 (.548), his career managerial record fell nine games short of .500, at 418–427 (.495).

As a coach, Scheffing also served with the St. Louis Browns (1952–53) and Milwaukee Braves (1960, under Dressen), in addition to his tenure with the Cubs.

== Mets' general manager ==
After working as a Detroit scout and radio broadcaster, Scheffing succeeded Eddie Stanky as player personnel director with the New York Mets in December 1965. He was promoted to general manager on January 19, 1970, five days after the death of his predecessor Johnny Murphy. The Mets won the 1973 National League pennant during his tenure, then fell in a seven-game World Series to the Oakland Athletics.

Scheffing's tenure as Mets general manager is most noted for his trade in which Nolan Ryan was one of four players sent to the California Angels for Jim Fregosi on December 10, 1971. Ryan went on to set the all-time career strikeout record and earn a place in the Baseball Hall of Fame, while Fregosi struggled in New York. Scheffing was replaced by Joe McDonald as Mets' GM on October 2, 1974, although he continued in the organization as a scout.

He died in Phoenix, Arizona, at the age of 72.

== See also ==
- 1961 Detroit Tigers season

Sporting positions
Preceded by Jack Warner	Los Angeles Angels (PCL) manager 1955–1956	Succeeded by Clay Bryant
Preceded by Johnny Murphy	New York Mets general manager 1970–1975	Succeeded by Joe McDonald
