= Missouri Route 180 =

State highway in Missouri, U.S.

Route 180
- MO 180 highlighted in red

Route information
- Maintained by MoDOT
- Length: 13.895 mi (22.362 km)

Major junctions
- West end: Pennridge Drive in Bridgeton
- I-270 in Bridgeton; I-70 in Bridgeton; I-170 in Charlack
- East end: Route D in St. Louis

Location
- Country: United States
- State: Missouri
- Counties: St. Louis

Highway system
- Missouri State Highway System; Interstate; US; State; Supplemental
| ← Route 179 | → Route 181 |

Route 180 is a highway in the St. Louis, Missouri area. Its western terminus is at Interstate 270 (I-270) in Bridgeton, running east into the western neighborhoods of St. Louis to its eastern terminus at Kingshighway Boulevard, the border of the St. Louis neighborhoods of Kingsway West and Kingsway East.

== Route description ==
Route 180 is co-signed with Dr. Martin Luther King Drive, where the Drive (which originates farther east, where the Martin Luther King Bridge crosses the Mississippi River into central St. Louis) continues through to join Route 180's eastern terminus at Kingshighway Boulevard, in St. Louis. Route 180 is co-signed with Dr. Martin Luther King Drive, as both travel east, until it crosses the border between the cities of Wellston (to the east) and Pagedale, at a T intersection with Lucas-Hunt Road, where Route 180 becomes co-signed with St. Charles Rock Road through Pagedale and continuing west.

== Major intersections ==
| County | Location | mi | km | Destinations | Notes |
|---|---|---|---|---|---|
| St. Louis | Bridgeton | 0.000 | 0.000 | Pennridge Drive | Western terminus |
| St. Louis | Bridgeton | 0.137 | 0.220 | I-270 to I-70 | Exit 20A on I-270 |
| St. Louis | Bridgeton | 0.258 | 0.415 | Route B east (Natural Bridge Road) | Western terminus of Route B |
| St. Louis | Bridgeton | 1.645 | 2.647 | I-70 – Wentzville, St. Louis | Exit 234 on I-70 |
| St. Louis | Bridgeton | 2.495 | 4.015 | US 67 (Lindbergh Boulevard) | Interchange |
| St. Louis | Charlack | 6.417 | 10.327 | I-170 | Exit 5 on I-170 |
| St. Louis | Pagedale | 8.287 | 13.337 | Route 180 Spur south (Pennsylvania Avenue) | Northern terminus of Route 180 Spur |
| St. Louis | Wellston | 9.341 | 15.033 | Route U north (Lucas–Hunt Road) | Southern terminus of Route U |
| City of St. Louis | | 11.540 | 18.572 | Kingshighway Boulevard | |
| City of St. Louis | | 13.895 | 22.362 | Route D (Page Avenue / Dr. Martin Luther King Jr. Boulevard) | Eastern terminus; Dr. MLK Jr. Boulevard continues east as Route D |
1.000 mi = 1.609 km; 1.000 km = 0.621 mi

== Auxiliary route ==
Route 180 Spur
- Location: Pagedale
- Length: 0.867 mi (1,395 m)

Route 180 Spur, also known as Pennsylvania Avenue, starts at an intersection with Route 180 and proceeds south to terminate at Route D (Page Avenue) in Pagedale.
