= Interstate 170 =

Auxiliary Interstate Highway in St. Louis County, Missouri, United States

Interstate 170
- Inner Belt Expressway
- I-170 highlighted in red

Route information
- Auxiliary route of I-70
- Maintained by MoDOT
- Length: 11.17 mi (17.98 km)
- Existed: 1956–present
- NHS: Entire route

Major junctions
- South end: I-64 / US 40 in Richmond Heights
- I-70 in Berkeley
- North end: I-270 in Hazelwood

Location
- Country: United States
- State: Missouri
- Counties: St. Louis

Highway system
- Interstate Highway System; Main; Auxiliary; Suffixed; Business; Future; Missouri State Highway System; Interstate; US; State; Supplemental
← US 169	→ Route 171

Interstate 170 (I-170), also known as the Inner Belt Expressway, is an 11.17-mile (17.98 km) north–south auxiliary Interstate Highway in Greater St. Louis, Missouri. I-170 connects to I-270 at its northern terminus and I-64 at its southern terminus. I-170 crosses its parent, I-70, near St. Louis Lambert International Airport.

== History ==
I-170 was originally intended to provide an inner beltway within I-270 through St. Louis County extending to I-55 in the southern part of the county, commonly called South County; however, the portion of the route south of I-64/US Route 40 (US 40) was canceled due to local opposition. The portion of MetroLink's Cross County Extension south of I-64 runs roughly along the proposed alignment.

The southern portion of I-170 was built using St. Louis County funds in the 1960s through a shallow valley. It was signed as Route 725.

=== Recent construction ===
The southern two interchanges on I-170 (at I-64/US 40 and Galleria Parkway) were rebuilt during the first phase of the New I-64 project. The project added direct access to I-170 from eastbound I-64, eliminated access to Galleria Parkway from northbound I-170, and revised Eager Road access to and from I-170.

== Southern extension ==
Proposals have been made to extend I-170 south beyond its termination at I-64/US 40, and so connect to I-55, I-270, and I-44, and to towns such as Richmond Heights, Brentwood, Maplewood, and Marlborough. These towns currently lack direct access to the Interstates, St. Louis Lambert International Airport, South County, and to each other. Many commuters travel on slower surface streets, such as Hanley Road or River Des Peres Boulevard, raising traffic in Shrewsbury and other residential towns. These proposals had been postponed due to lack of funding.

== Exit list ==
The entire route is in St. Louis County.

Location	mi	km	Exit	Destinations	Notes
Richmond Heights	0.00	0.00	1	I-64 / US 40 / Lewis and Clark Trail – Wentzville, St. Louis	Signed as exits 1A (east) and 1B (west)
Richmond Heights	0.438	0.705	1C	Brentwood Boulevard north / Eager Road	Southbound exit and northbound entrance
Clayton	0.809	1.302	1D	Brentwood Boulevard south	Southbound exit and northbound entrance (via Galleria Parkway)
Clayton	1.170	1.883	1E	Forest Park Parkway east	Western terminus of the Forest Park Parkway
Ladue	1.611	2.593	1F	Ladue Road	
University City	2.374	3.821	2	Delmar Boulevard	
Olivette	3.336	5.369	3	Route 340 (Olive Boulevard)	
Overland	4.325	6.960	4	Route D (Page Avenue)	
St. John	5.865	9.439	5	Route 180 (St. Charles Rock Road)	
Bel-Ridge	7.027	11.309	6	Route 115 (Natural Bridge Road) – Cargo City	Access to the University of Missouri-St. Louis
Berkeley	7.654	12.318	7	I-70 – St. Louis, Kansas City	Signed as exit 7A (east) and 7B (west); exit 235
Berkeley	7.771	12.506	7C	Lambert–St. Louis International Airport	Southbound exit is via exit 7B
Berkeley	8.577	13.803	8	Scudder Road / North Hanley Road	No northbound entrance
Berkeley	9.167	14.753	9A	Airport Road – Cargo City	
Berkeley	9.236	14.864	9B	Boeing	Northbound exit and southbound entrance
Berkeley	9.780	15.739	9C	North Hanley Road	Northbound exit and southbound entrance
Hazelwood	10.894– 11.255	17.532– 18.113	10	I-270 – Kansas City, Chicago	Signed as exits 10A (west) and 10B (east)
1.000 mi = 1.609 km; 1.000 km = 0.621 mi: Incomplete access
