= Edmundson, Missouri =

- City (since January 4, 1993)
- Motto: "Front Door to Saint Louis Lambert; International Airport"
- Location of Edmundson, Missouri
- Coordinates: 38°44′06″N 90°21′57″W
- Country: United States
- State: Missouri
- County: St. Louis
- Township: Airport

Government
  - Type: Mayor and Board of Aldermen
  - Mayor: John Gwaltney

Area
  - Total: 0.27 sq mi (0.71 km^{2})
  - Land: 0.27 sq mi (0.71 km^{2})
  - Water: 0 sq mi (0.00 km^{2})
- Elevation: 591 ft (180 m)

Population (2020)
  - Total: 860
  - Density: 3,135.5/sq mi (1,210.61/km^{2})
- Time zone: UTC-6 (Central (CST))
  - Summer (DST): UTC-5 (CDT)
- FIPS code: 29-21376
- GNIS feature ID: 2394624
- Website: www.cityofedmundson.com

Edmundson is a city in Airport Township, St. Louis County, Missouri, United States. The population was estimated to be 860 at the time of the 2020 census.

== Geography ==
According to the United States Census Bureau, the city has a total area of 0.26 square miles (0.67 km^{2}), all land.

== History ==
In 1941, four days before the events of Pearl Harbor, a subdivision of 156 homes named "Edmundson Terrace" was offered for sale to the public. This was one of St. Louis County's first subdivisions. On May 12, 1948, Edmundson Terrace was incorporated as the Village of Edmundson, a village under Missouri law. By 1965, Edmundson had tripled or quadrupled in area; it had a population of 2500, which included 415 single-family homes, a row of duplexes, and 315 units at the Bobbie Downs Apartments. On the ballot for the 1992 election, Edmundson residents chose to become a fourth class city, effective January 4, 1993.

== Demographics ==
Historical population
Census	Pop.	Note	%±
1950	621		—
1960	1,428		130.0%
1970	2,298		60.9%
1980	1,374		−40.2%
1990	1,111		−19.1%
2000	840		−24.4%
2010	834		−0.7%
2020	860		3.1%
U.S. Decennial Census

=== 2020 census ===
Edmundson city, Missouri – Racial and ethnic composition Note: the US Census treats Hispanic/Latino as an ethnic category. This table excludes Latinos from the racial categories and assigns them to a separate category. Hispanics/Latinos may be of any race.
Race / Ethnicity (NH = Non-Hispanic)	Pop 2000	Pop 2010	Pop 2020	% 2000	% 2010	% 2020
White alone (NH)	599	453	325	71.31%	54.32%	37.79%
Black or African American alone (NH)	158	220	290	18.81%	26.38%	33.72%
Native American or Alaska Native alone (NH)	4	5	0	0.48%	0.60%	0.00%
Asian alone (NH)	10	13	14	1.19%	1.56%	1.63%
Native Hawaiian or Pacific Islander alone (NH)	5	1	0	0.60%	0.12%	0.00%
Other race alone (NH)	0	1	9	0.00%	0.12%	1.05%
Mixed race or Multiracial (NH)	17	41	70	2.02%	4.92%	8.14%
Hispanic or Latino (any race)	47	100	152	5.60%	11.99%	17.67%
Total	840	834	860	100.00%	100.00%	100.00%

As of the 2020 census, there were 860 people and 397 households living in the city. The racial makeup of the city was 42.7% White (37.8% non-Hispanic white), 44.0% African American, 1.7% Asian, 0.1% Pacific Islander, 10.2% from other races, and 11.4% from two or more races. Hispanic or Latino of any race were 17.7% of the population.

=== 2010 census ===
As of the census of 2010, there were 834 people, 310 households, and 197 families living in the city. The population density was 3,207.7 inhabitants per square mile (1,238.5/km^{2}). There were 345 housing units at an average density of 1,326.9 per square mile (512.3/km^{2}). The racial makeup of the city was 56.5% White (54.3% non-Hispanic white), 26.4% African American, 1.6% Native American, 1.6% Asian, 0.1% Pacific Islander, 8.6% from other races, and 5.3% from two or more races. Hispanic or Latino of any race were 12.0% of the population.

There were 310 households, of which 40.0% had children under the age of 18 living with them, 32.9% were married couples living together, 24.2% had a female householder with no husband present, 6.5% had a male householder with no wife present, and 36.5% were non-families. 29.4% of all households were made up of individuals, and 11.6% had someone living alone who was 65 years of age or older. The average household size was 2.69 and the average family size was 3.37.

The median age in the city was 30.1 years. 31.3% of residents were under the age of 18; 8.9% were between the ages of 18 and 24; 30.5% were from 25 to 44; 19.6% were from 45 to 64; and 9.8% were 65 years of age or older. The gender makeup of the city was 48.7% male and 51.3% female.

=== 2000 census ===
As of the census of 2000, there were 840 people, 330 households, and 211 families living in the city. The population density was 3,018 inhabitants per square mile (1,165/km^{2}). There were 356 housing units at an average density of 1,279.1 per square mile (493.9/km^{2}). The racial makeup of the city was 73.81% White, 18.81% African American, 1.19% Asian, 0.60% Pacific Islander, 0.48% Native American, 2.62% from other races, and 2.50% from two or more races. Hispanic or Latino of any race were 5.60% of the population.

There were 330 households, out of which 35.2% had children under the age of 18 living with them, 42.1% were married couples living together, 19.1% had a female householder with no husband present, and 35.8% were non-families. 28.8% of all households were made up of individuals, and 9.1% had someone living alone who was 65 years of age or older. The average household size was 2.55 and the average family size was 3.16.

In the city the population was spread out, with 28.5% under the age of 18, 10.0% from 18 to 24, 28.3% from 25 to 44, 22.6% from 45 to 64, and 10.6% who were 65 years of age or older. The median age was 34 years. For every 100 females, there were 88.3 males. For every 100 females age 18 and over, there were 86.6 males.

The median income for a household in the city was $37,083, and the median income for a family was $39,531. Males had a median income of $29,417 versus $25,000 for females. The per capita income for the city was $14,123. About 20.6% of families and 20.3% of the population were below the poverty line, including 29.5% of those under age 18 and 10.8% of those age 65 or over.

== Education ==
All students attend schools in the Ritenour School District.

== Public safety ==
Edmundson is served by the Edmundson Police Department, located at 4440 Holman Lane. Nine full-time officers protect this city. Community Fire Protection District operates fire and EMS from its stations in neighboring Saint Ann and Woodson Terrace that serve Edmundson residents.

In April 2014, Edmundson Mayor John Gwaltney suggested in a letter to the city's police officers to write more tickets in order to fund the city's budget, while reminding officers that their pay adjustments would also be affected.
