= Ann Purzner =

American politician

Ann Purzner was the mayor of Overland, Missouri, having been elected by five votes in April 2006. She was the subject of some controversy and was eventually recalled from office.

== Controversy ==
Immediately after taking office, Mayor Purzner attempted to replace police chief James Herron and city attorney Robert Herman without the consent of the city council. Mayor Purzner also ran into trouble over where to hold city council meetings. A group of citizens brought suit, asserting that Mayor Purzner deliberately scheduled the meetings in a room too small to accommodate Overland citizens who wanted to attend, and that this violated Missouri's Sunshine Law.

Mayor Purzner was later found to have misrepresented herself during her mayoral campaign by claiming to have been a registered nurse. Mayor Purzner's false claims were made four years after a 2002 investigation by Missouri's nursing board, which found that Mayor Purzner was a medical assistant who had previously pretended to be a registered nurse and lied about attending the nursing school at Maryville University. At the end of this investigation Mayor Purzner was banned from practicing as or representing herself as a nurse.

In May 2006, St. Louis County prosecutor Bob McCulloch labeled Mayor Purzner a "liar" with "zero credibility", and sued her for exceeding her power as mayor. A judge later ruled against Mayor Purzner over the dismissal of the police chief and attorney and both were reinstated.

== Recall ==
Largely due to these controversies, a group of Overland residents began a recall campaign in June 2006. In response to criticism, Mayor Purzner stated, "I have always tried to do the best for the community...I am like an angel."

Mayor Purzner attempted to block the recall effort by filing suit against the election board, claiming there was no legal basis for the recall, but lost the case. Mayor Purzner was recalled on April 3, 2007, having received 1170 votes to retain her in office and 3167 votes for recall. She served just 11 months of her term.

The City of Overland set August 7, 2007 as the date for an election to choose a new mayor.

Councilman Jerry May, the City Council President Pro Tem, fulfilled the mayoral duties following the ouster of Ann Purzner in the recall election. City councilman Michael Schneider won the August 2007 election and served as mayor of Overland until 2022.

== Death ==
Ann Purzner died on 5 February 2012 at the age of 73.
