= Ron Hunt =

American baseball player (1941–2026)

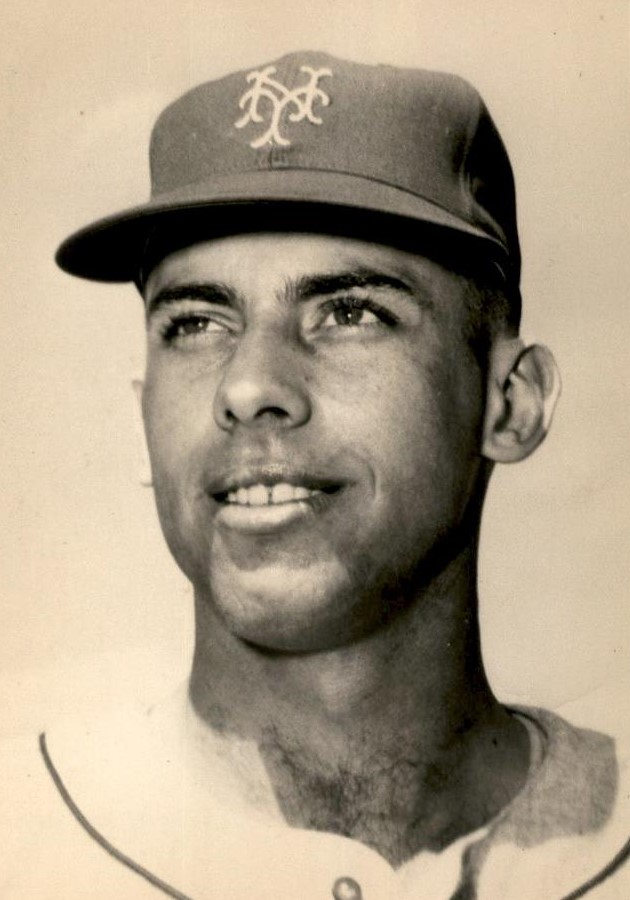
- Second baseman
- Born: February 23, 1941; St. Louis, Missouri, U.S.
- Died: July 15, 2026 (aged 85); Wentzville, Missouri, U.S.
- Batted: Right Threw: Right

MLB debut
- April 16, 1963, for the New York Mets

Last MLB appearance
- September 28, 1974, for the St. Louis Cardinals

MLB statistics
- Batting average: .273
- Home runs: 39
- Runs batted in: 370
- Stats at Baseball Reference

Teams
- New York Mets (1963–1966); Los Angeles Dodgers (1967); San Francisco Giants (1968–1970); Montreal Expos (1971–1974); St. Louis Cardinals (1974)

Career highlights and awards
- 2× All-Star (1964, 1966); Montreal Expos Hall of Fame

Ronald Kenneth Hunt (February 23, 1941 – July 15, 2026) was an American professional baseball second baseman. He played 12 seasons in Major League Baseball from 1963 to 1974 for the New York Mets, Los Angeles Dodgers, San Francisco Giants, Montreal Expos, and St. Louis Cardinals. Hunt batted and threw right-handed.

In 1971 Hunt set a modern era single-season record for hit by pitches.

== Early life ==
Hunt was born in St. Louis on February 23, 1941. He graduated from Ritenour High School in Breckenridge Hills, Missouri, where he played football and baseball.

== Career ==
After graduating, he signed with the Milwaukee Braves, with whom he spent four years in the minor leagues. The Mets purchased his contract in October 1962 and added him to the major league roster.

Hunt broke into the major leagues in 1963 as the Mets' regular second baseman, batting .272 with 10 home runs, which would be his career high, and 42 runs batted in, which he would tie in 1964. Hunt had been the bullpen catcher until he approached manager Casey Stengel and asked to be sent to the minor leagues to play second base, if the Mets were not going to play him. Stengel responded by making Hunt the second baseman.

That year, he also finished runner-up to Pete Rose for the National League Rookie of the Year honors. In something that would highlight his career, Stengel had offered a bonus to players willing to be hit by pitches (HBP) if it won a game. Hunt was hit by pitches 13 times that year.

In 1964 he batted .303 and became an NL All-Star representative. The game was played in Hunt's home ballpark, the newly opened Shea Stadium. He got one hit in three at bats in the game. He was also an All-Star representative in 1966. Hunt had no hits in one official at bat, but had a sacrifice bunt in the bottom of the 10th inning that moved Tim McCarver to second base to set up the winning run when Maury Wills' single drove McCarver home for the NL win. He was hit by 11 pitches that year.

He was injured in 1965, and played in only 57 games. He was hit by pitches 6 times, the only time in his twelve year career he was not hit by at least 10 pitches. In 1966, Hunt's last year with the Mets, he had a .288 batting average, scored 63 runs, and was hit by 11 pitches. In November 1966, Hunt and Jim Hickman were traded to the Los Angeles Dodgers for Tommy Davis and Derrell Griffith. After batting .263 during the 1967 season, a year in which he was injured again, and being hit by 10 pitches, Hunt was traded with Nate Oliver to the San Francisco Giants for Tom Haller and Frank Kasheta.

In his first season with the Giants in 1968, Hunt batted .250 with two home runs, and scored 79 runs. He was hit by pitches 25 times, leading the league. This was the first of seven consecutive years he led the NL in being hit by pitches. His second home run came off Bob Gibson in the first inning of the Giants' September 17 game against the St. Louis Cardinals, and accounted for the only run in Gaylord Perry's no-hitter.

After two more seasons in San Francisco (batting .262 and .281, and being hit by pitches 25 and 26 times respectively), Hunt was traded to the Montreal Expos after the 1970 season. In 1971, he hit .279 and scored 89 runs. He was hit by pitches a remarkable 50 times, a post-1900 record.

In nearly four seasons in Montreal, he batted .277, including a career high .309 in 1973. After his record of being hit 50 times in 1971, he would follow that up with 26, 24, and 16 (14 with the Expos) in the next three years. Late in the 1974 season, the struggling Expos, seeking to turn over their roster, made Hunt the first to go by placing him on waivers. He was claimed by his hometown St. Louis Cardinals, with whom he closed out his career after playing 12 games. The Cardinals brought Hunt to Spring training in 1975, but released him in March, after which he retired.

In his 12-year career Hunt batted .273 with 39 home runs and 370 RBIs in 1483 games played. He was also one of the most difficult batters to strike out, fanning 382 times in 5235 at-bats, or once in every 13.70 at-bats (tied for 369th best as of 2024). In 1973, he set an Expos record by striking out only 19 times in 401 at-bats, the fewest ever in franchise history by a player who had at least 400 at-bats on the season.

Hunt hit his last major league home run on September 21, 1971, in the first game of a doubleheader against the Phillies as a member of the Expos at Jarry Park. He then went 1,302 at-bats, 1,571 plate appearances and 378 games without hitting another when he closed out his career at the end of the 1974 season with a brief stint with the St. Louis Cardinals.

== Hit by pitches ==
Hunt, whose motto was, "Some people give their bodies to science; I give mine to baseball," was hit by pitches more often than anyone during his playing days. He led the National League in getting hit by pitches in each of his final seven Major League seasons, and the entire Major Leagues in all of those years but his final season (1974, when the Orioles' Bobby Grich was hit 20 times). He was hit by 25 pitches in 1968, 25 in 1969, 26 in 1970, 50 in 1971, 26 in 1972 and 24 in 1973, and 16 in 1974.

He said in a July 2000 interview with Baseball Digest that he really began to get hit by pitches after being traded to San Francisco. "But," Hunt asked, "why would you hit me to face Willie Mays, Willie McCovey, and Jim Ray Hart?"

It was when Hunt was with the Giants that he made a close study of how to be hit by pitches. He knew the rules required that a batter had to "attempt" to get out of the way of a pitched ball. He would practice by standing in front of a mirror, aligning his shoulders, elbows, hips, and ankles exactly where the corner of home plate would be, and practice twisting his body toward the catcher. He was not actually moving out of the way of the pitched ball, but he made an appearance of moving that he could contend met the rule's definition of an "attempt".

In 1971, as a member of the Montreal Expos, he set a single-season record for being hit by more pitches (50) than any player since 1900. This was the most since the 19th century Baltimore Orioles' shortstop Hughie Jennings was hit 51 times in 1896 (At the time Hunt was hit by his fiftieth, Jennings was credited with only 49 HBPs in 1896. Hunt was therefore credited in 1971 with setting a new all-time record. Years later, further historical research gave Jennings credit for two more HBPs in 1896, restoring the all-time record to Jennings.). As of 2024, the closest post-1900 player to Hunt in being hit by pitches in a season is Don Baylor, with 35 in 1986.

Hunt, who batted right-handed, would stand with his "left arm hanging over the plate" and allow himself to be hit to make up for his lack of hitting power. On June 25, 1971, he was hit three times during a doubleheader. He had the habit of tossing back the ball that had hit him to the pitcher.

On September 29, 1971, against the Chicago Cubs at Jarry Park, Hunt was hit by a Milt Pappas pitch to give him 50 on the season, obliterating the post-1900 record of 31 by Steve Evans. Pappas, furious at Hunt, argued to home plate umpire Ken Burkhart that the pitch was directly over the plate, that Hunt got hit by the ball without even trying to get out of the way. Earlier in the year, Pappas had also contributed #27 in the Hunt collection, prompting Cub manager Leo Durocher to cry foul after home plate umpire Augie Donatelli awarded Hunt first base on that pitch. Cincinnati Reds manager Sparky Anderson had a similar complaint after Hunt was hit by a Jim McGlothlin pitch on August 7 of that year; the HBP was Hunt's 32nd of the season, which broke the National League record set by Steve Evans of the 1910 St. Louis Cardinals.

On April 29, 1969, Hunt tied a Major League record with three HBPs in a game against the Cincinnati Reds. At the time, he was only the fifth player to be hit by a pitch three times in one game. As of 2024, the feat has been done over 30 times.

Upon his retirement, his 243 HBPs were a post-dead-ball era career record. Hughie Jennings holds the all-time record with 287. Don Baylor broke the live-ball record in 1987 and retired with 267 HBPs. Craig Biggio broke Baylor's record in 2005 and retired at the end of the 2007 season with 285 HBPs.

== Personal life and death ==
After baseball, Hunt owned a liquor store and a sporting goods store in Wentzville, Missouri. Hunt later raised cattle. He founded The Ron Hunt Eagles Baseball Association, a non-profit corporation. It is a live-in training program for 14-18 year olds from the United States, Canada, and overseas come to learn and play team baseball, and to prepare them for college. The players live on site in dorms and play on a field Hunt built, competing in around 40 games over the summer with teams across the Midwest.

As of 2018, he was reportedly suffering from Parkinson's disease. Doctors attributed his Parkinson’s-like symptoms to head trauma sustained during his baseball career.

Ron Hunt died from Parkinson's disease and cancer in St. Louis on July 15, 2026, at the age of 85.
