= Bel-Ridge, Missouri =

- City
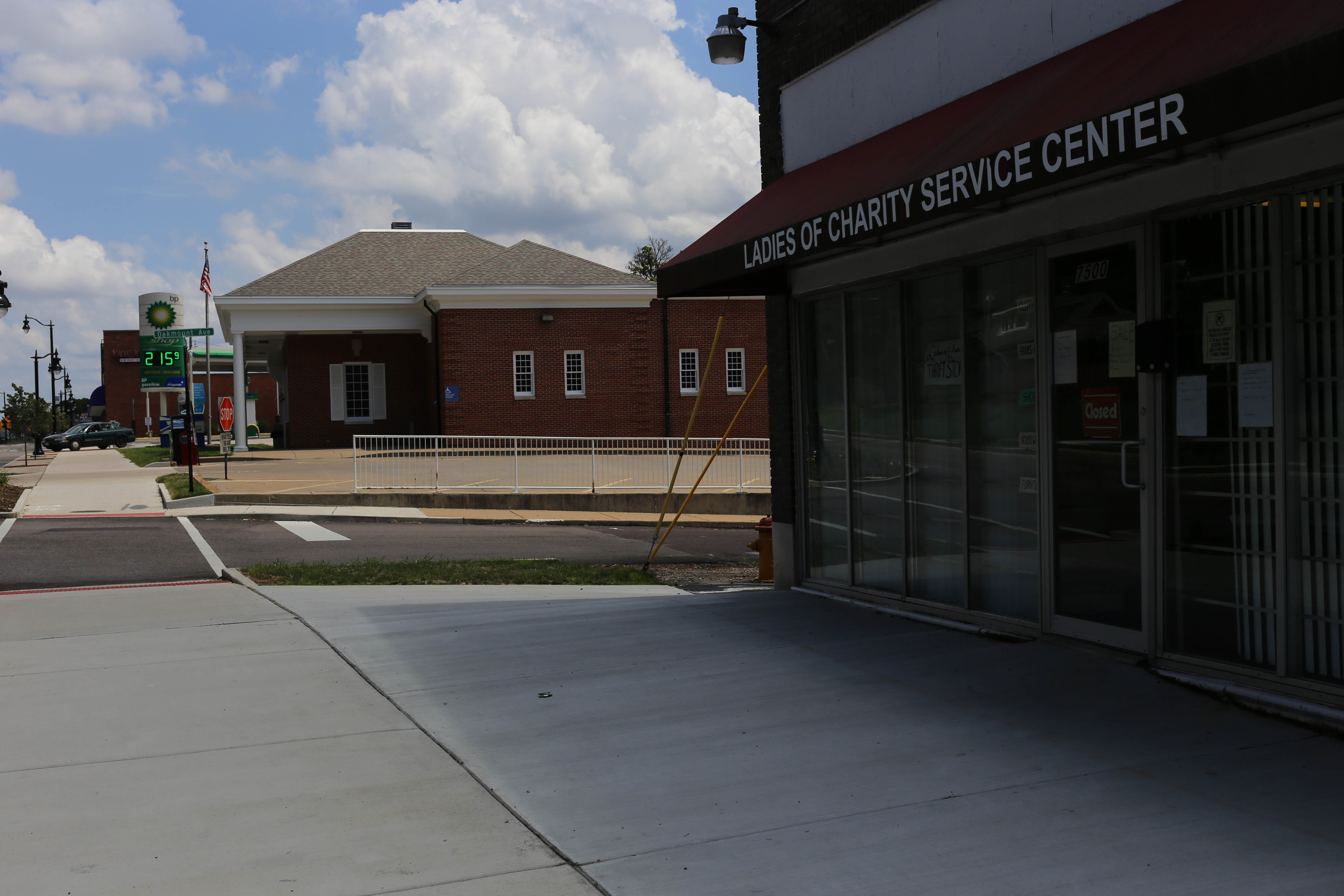
- Buildings in Bel-Ridge, July 2016

- Logo

- Location of Bel-Ridge, Missouri
- Coordinates: 38°42′46″N 90°19′43″W
- Country: United States
- State: Missouri
- County: St. Louis
- Townships: Normandy, Airport, Midland
- Incorporated: 1947

Area
  - Total: 0.77 sq mi (2.00 km^{2})
  - Land: 0.77 sq mi (2.00 km^{2})
  - Water: 0 sq mi (0.00 km^{2})
- Elevation: 584 ft (178 m)

Population (2020)
  - Total: 2,132
  - Density: 2,758/sq mi (1,064.9/km^{2})
- Time zone: UTC-6 (Central (CST))
  - Summer (DST): UTC-5 (CDT)
- FIPS code: 29-04366
- GNIS feature ID: 2398090
- Website: Bel-Ridge, Missouri

Bel-Ridge is a suburban city in northern St. Louis County, Missouri, United States. The population was 2,132 at the 2020 census. Bel-Ridge is part of the Normandy Schools Collaborative. Bel-Ridge became a city in 2015 by a vote of the voters.

== Geography ==
According to the United States Census Bureau, the village has a total area of 0.80 square miles (2.07 km^{2}), all land.

== Demographics ==
Historical population
Census	Pop.	Note	%±
1950	1,116		—
1960	4,395		293.8%
1970	5,346		21.6%
1980	3,682		−31.1%
1990	3,199		−13.1%
2000	3,082		−3.7%
2010	2,737		−11.2%
2020	2,132		−22.1%
U.S. Decennial Census

=== 2020 census ===
Bel-Ridge, Missouri – Racial and ethnic composition Note: the US Census treats Hispanic/Latino as an ethnic category. This table excludes Latinos from the racial categories and assigns them to a separate category. Hispanics/Latinos may be of any race.
Race / Ethnicity (NH = Non-Hispanic)	Pop 2000	Pop 2010	Pop 2020	% 2000	% 2010	% 2020
White alone (NH)	530	381	244	17.20%	13.92%	11.44%
Black or African American alone (NH)	2,448	2,260	1,689	79.43%	82.57%	79.22%
Native American or Alaska Native alone (NH)	6	7	7	0.19%	0.26%	0.33%
Asian alone (NH)	12	10	1	0.39%	0.37%	0.05%
Pacific Islander or Native Hawaiian alone (NH)	0	1	0	0.00%	0.04%	0.00%
Other race alone (NH)	2	1	7	0.06%	0.04%	0.33%
Mixed race or Multiracial (NH)	48	42	90	1.56%	1.53%	4.22%
Hispanic or Latino (any race)	36	35	94	1.17%	1.28%	4.41%
Total	3,082	2,737	2,132	100.00%	100.00%	100.00%

=== 2010 census ===
As of the census of 2010, there were 2,737 people, 1,087 households, and 690 families living in the village. The population density was 3,421.3 inhabitants per square mile (1,321.0/km^{2}). There were 1,249 housing units at an average density of 1,561.3 per square mile (602.8/km^{2}). The racial makeup of the village was 14.2% White, 83.1% African American, 0.3% Native American, 0.4% Asian, 0.4% from other races, and 1.6% from two or more races. Hispanic or Latino of any race were 1.3% of the population.

There were 1,087 households, of which 39.9% had children under the age of 18 living with them, 18.1% were married couples living together, 38.7% had a female householder with no husband present, 6.6% had a male householder with no wife present, and 36.5% were non-families. 30.5% of all households were made up of individuals, and 5.4% had someone living alone who was 65 years of age or older. The average household size was 2.52 and the average family size was 3.12.

The median age in the village was 28.7 years. 29.5% of residents were under the age of 18; 14.9% were between the ages of 18 and 24; 23.7% were from 25 to 44; 23.9% were from 45 to 64; and 8.1% were 65 years of age or older. The gender makeup of the village was 45.0% male and 55.0% female.

=== 2000 census ===
As of the census of 2000, there were 3,082 people, 1,180 households, and 748 families living in the village. The population density was 3,799.0 inhabitants per square mile (1,466.8/km^{2}). There were 1,288 housing units at an average density of 1,587.7 per square mile (613.0/km^{2}). The racial makeup of the village was 17.55% White, 79.66% African American, 0.23% Native American, 0.39% Asian, 0.03% Pacific Islander, 0.13% from other races, and 2.01% from two or more races. Hispanic or Latino of any race were 1.17% of the population.

There were 1,180 households, out of which 36.9% had children under the age of 18 living with them, 23.7% were married couples living together, 34.4% had a female householder with no husband present, and 36.6% were non-families. 30.0% of all households were made up of individuals, and 5.1% had someone living alone who was 65 years of age or older. The average household size was 2.60 and the average family size was 3.26.

In the village, the population was spread out, with 32.5% under the age of 18, 12.3% from 18 to 24, 29.4% from 25 to 44, 18.8% from 45 to 64, and 7.0% who were 65 years of age or older. The median age was 28 years. For every 100 females, there were 85.8 males. For every 100 females age 18 and over, there were 74.0 males.

The median income for a household in the village was $47,500, and the median income for a family was $53,550. Males had a median income of $49,844 versus $49,576 for females. The per capita income for the village was $39,073. About 13.5% of families and 9.7% of the population were below the poverty line, including 10.1% of those under age 18 and 7.8% of those age 65 or over.

== Education ==
It is in the Normandy Schools Collaborative school district. The comprehensive high school of the district is Normandy High School.

Bel-Ridge Elementary School was in Bel-Ridge, as was Normandy Kindergarten Center, which had a Bel-Nor postal address but was in Bel-Ridge.
