= Sycamore Hills, Missouri =

- Village
- Location of Sycamore Hills, Missouri
- Coordinates: 38°42′04″N 90°20′57″W
- Country: United States
- State: Missouri
- County: St. Louis
- Township: Midland
- Incorporated: November 3, 1941

Area
  - Total: 0.14 sq mi (0.35 km^{2})
  - Land: 0.14 sq mi (0.35 km^{2})
  - Water: 0 sq mi (0.00 km^{2})
- Elevation: 643 ft (196 m)

Population (2020)
  - Total: 561
  - Density: 4,198.0/sq mi (1,620.86/km^{2})
- Time zone: UTC-6 (Central (CST))
  - Summer (DST): UTC-5 (CDT)
- ZIP code: 63114
- Area code: 314
- FIPS code: 29-72034
- GNIS feature ID: 2399943
- Website: www.villageofsycamorehills.com

Sycamore Hills is a village in Midland Township, St. Louis County, Missouri, United States. The population was 560 at the 2020 census.

== Geography ==
According to the United States Census Bureau, the village has a total area of 0.14 square miles (0.36 km^{2}), all land.

== Demographics ==
Historical population
Census	Pop.	Note	%±
1950	989		—
1960	942		−4.8%
1970	821		−12.8%
1980	741		−9.7%
1990	667		−10.0%
2000	722		8.2%
2010	668		−7.5%
2020	561		−16.0%
U.S. Decennial Census

=== 2020 census ===
Sycamore Hills village, Missouri – Racial and ethnic composition Note: the US Census treats Hispanic/Latino as an ethnic category. This table excludes Latinos from the racial categories and assigns them to a separate category. Hispanics/Latinos may be of any race.
Race / Ethnicity (NH = Non-Hispanic)	Pop 2000	Pop 2010	Pop 2020	% 2000	% 2010	% 2020
White alone (NH)	654	530	394	90.58%	79.34%	70.23%
Black or African American alone (NH)	50	78	100	6.93%	11.68%	17.83%
Native American or Alaska Native alone (NH)	3	0	0	0.42%	0.00%	0.00%
Asian alone (NH)	0	5	5	0.00%	0.75%	0.89%
Native Hawaiian or Pacific Islander alone (NH)	0	0	0	0.00%	0.00%	0.00%
Other race alone (NH)	2	5	1	0.28%	0.75%	0.18%
Mixed race or Multiracial (NH)	10	22	32	1.39%	3.29%	5.70%
Hispanic or Latino (any race)	3	28	29	0.42%	4.19%	5.17%
Total	722	668	561	100.00%	100.00%	100.00%

As of the 2020 census, there were 560 people and 291 households living in the city. The racial makeup of the village was 71.4% White (70.4% non-Hispanic White), 18.6% African American, 0.6% Asian, 0.9% from other races, and 8.2% from two or more races. Hispanic or Latino of any race were 5.2% of the population.

=== 2010 census ===
As of the census of 2012, there were 827 people, 293 households, and 171 families living in the village. The population density was 4,771.4 inhabitants per square mile (1,842.2/km^{2}). There were 294 housing units at an average density of 2,100.0 per square mile (810.8/km^{2}). The racial makeup of the village was 82.8% White, 12.3% African American, 0.7% Asian, 0.7% from other races, and 3.4% from two or more races. Hispanic or Latino of any race were 4.3% of the population.

There were 293 households, of which 28.4% had children under the age of 18 living with them, 44.3% were married couples living together, 12.1% had a female householder with no husband present, 2.8% had a male householder with no wife present, and 40.8% were non-families. 30.5% of all households were made up of individuals, and 11.7% had someone living alone who was 65 years of age or older. The average household size was 2.37 and the average family size was 3.00.

The median age in the village was 40.9 years. 20.5% of residents were under the age of 18; 7.3% were between the ages of 18 and 24; 27.6% were from 25 to 44; 30.5% were from 45 to 64; and 14.1% were 65 years of age or older. The gender makeup of the village was 48.5% male and 51.5% female.

=== 2000 census ===
As of the census of 2000, there were 722 people, 289 households, and 180 families living in the village. The population density was 5,249.0 inhabitants per square mile (2,026.7/km^{2}). There were 296 housing units at an average density of 2,152.0 per square mile (830.9/km^{2}). The racial makeup of the village was 90.72% White, 6.93% African American, 0.42% Native American, 0.42% from other races, and 1.52% from two or more races. Hispanic or Latino of any race were 0.42% of the population.

There were 289 households, out of which 32.2% had children under the age of 18 living with them, 49.1% were married couples living together, 10.4% had a female householder with no husband present, and 37.7% were non-families. 32.2% of all households were made up of individuals, and 10.7% had someone living alone who was 65 years of age or older. The average household size was 2.50 and the average family size was 3.22.

In the village, the population was spread out, with 27.6% under the age of 18, 6.1% from 18 to 24, 33.7% from 25 to 44, 19.8% from 45 to 64, and 12.9% who were 65 years of age or older. The median age was 37 years. For every 100 females, there were 96.7 males. For every 100 females age 18 and over, there were 90.9 males.

The median income for a household in the village was $41,146, and the median income for a family was $45,893. Males had a median income of $36,518 versus $26,016 for females. The per capita income for the village was $18,761. About 2.2% of families and 2.4% of the population were below the poverty line, including 4.4% of those under age 18 and 4.8% of those age 65 or over.
