= Charlack, Missouri =

- City
- Location of Charlack, Missouri
- Coordinates: 38°42′10″N 90°20′34″W
- Country: United States
- State: Missouri
- County: St. Louis
- Township: Midland

Government
  - Mayor: Mark Chamberlain
  - Chief of Police: Tim Swope

Area
  - Total: 0.27 sq mi (0.70 km^{2})
  - Land: 0.27 sq mi (0.70 km^{2})
  - Water: 0 sq mi (0.00 km^{2})
- Elevation: 600 ft (180 m)

Population (2020)
  - Total: 1,304
  - Density: 4,816.9/sq mi (1,859.81/km^{2})
- Time zone: UTC-6 (Central (CST))
  - Summer (DST): UTC-5 (CDT)
- ZIP code: 63114
- Area code: 314
- FIPS code: 29-13330
- GNIS feature ID: 2393802
- Website: www.cityofcharlack.gov

Charlack is a city in Midland Township, St. Louis County, Missouri, United States. The population was 1,304 at the 2020 census.

== Geography ==
The name of the city is a portmanteau, derived from its location at the intersection of St. Charles Rock Road with Lackland Road.

According to the United States Census Bureau, the city has a total area of 0.26 square miles (0.67 km^{2}), all land.

== Police department ==
In 1945, the village was patrolled by Charlack's first sheriff accompanied by two deputies. The Police Department now has eight full-time employees, a chief, a pair of sergeants and six patrolmen as well as five reserve officers. The department has approximately nine patrol vehicles ranging from 4-5 Dodge Chargers, a Ford Explorer, a Dodge Sprinter Van, and a Ford Escape Hybrid outfitted as a Mobile Radar Photo Enforcement Unit made by Redflex Systems and acquired in late 2011. It also has a Chevy van used to set up photo enforcement cameras. Dispatch is provided by St. Louis County.

Charlack began using speed cameras in March 2010. The cameras are provided by B&W Sensors, a company located in St. Louis. The speed cameras are on a mobile trailer which is located on top of I-170 on the Lackland Road Overpass. Charlack's then-police chief, Tony Umbertino, claimed that traffic fines account for about 29% of Charlack's operating budget. According to the then- Police Chief Umbertino, "The cameras have also been used on Lackland Road and Midland Road earlier in the year." Umbertino also served as the town manager.

Charlack has been criticized by the St. Louis Post-Dispatch for painting speed camera calibration lines on the highway without obtaining the proper permission. The Post-Dispatch has also reported that Charlack has complied with a previous agreement to man the speed camera stations. The department contracts with an outside vendor to collect traffic fines online.

== Education ==
Ritenour School District includes most of Charlack, while a piece is in the Normandy Schools Collaborative school district. The respective comprehensive high schools are Ritenour High School and Normandy High School.

== Demographics ==
Historical population
Census	Pop.	Note	%±
1950	1,528		—
1960	1,493		−2.3%
1970	1,872		25.4%
1980	1,537		−17.9%
1990	1,388		−9.7%
2000	1,431		3.1%
2010	1,363		−4.8%
2020	1,304		−4.3%
U.S. Decennial Census

Charlack city, Missouri – Racial and ethnic composition Note: the US Census treats Hispanic/Latino as an ethnic category. This table excludes Latinos from the racial categories and assigns them to a separate category. Hispanics/Latinos may be of any race.
Race / Ethnicity (NH = Non-Hispanic)	Pop 2000	Pop 2010	Pop 2020	% 2000	% 2010	% 2020
White alone (NH)	865	721	548	60.45%	52.90%	42.02%
Black or African American alone (NH)	466	479	543	32.56%	35.14%	41.64%
Native American or Alaska Native alone (NH)	10	2	5	0.70%	0.15%	0.38%
Asian alone (NH)	11	19	18	0.77%	1.39%	1.38%
Native Hawaiian or Pacific Islander alone (NH)	0	0	0	0.00%	0.00%	0.00%
Other race alone (NH)	1	5	4	0.07%	0.37%	0.31%
Mixed race or Multiracial (NH)	42	39	75	2.94%	2.86%	5.75%
Hispanic or Latino (any race)	36	98	111	2.52%	7.19%	8.51%
Total	1,431	1,363	1,304	100.00%	100.00%	100.00%

=== 2020 census ===
As of the 2020 census there were 1,304 people and 648 households living in the city. The racial makeup of the city was 43.9% White, 41.8% African American, 0.5% Native American, 1.4% Asian, 4.8% from other races, and 7.7% from two or more races. Hispanic or Latino of any race were 8.5% of the population.

=== 2010 census ===
As of the census of 2010, there were 1,363 people, 565 households, and 337 families living in the city. The population density was 5,242.3 inhabitants per square mile (2,024.1/km^{2}). There were 616 housing units at an average density of 2,369.2 per square mile (914.8/km^{2}). The racial makeup of the city was 55.8% White, 35.4% African American, 0.3% Native American, 1.5% Asian, 3.3% from other races, and 3.7% from two or more races. Hispanic or Latino of any race were 7.2% of the population.

There were 565 households, of which 35.6% had children under the age of 18 living with them, 30.3% were married couples living together, 21.4% had a female householder with no husband present, 8.0% had a male householder with no wife present, and 40.4% were non-families. 30.6% of all households were made up of individuals, and 6.9% had someone living alone who was 65 years of age or older. The average household size was 2.41 and the average family size was 3.02.

The median age in the city was 30.1 years. 25.8% of residents were under the age of 18; 13.3% were between the ages of 18 and 24; 31.5% were from 25 to 44; 22.4% were from 45 to 64; and 6.9% were 65 years of age or older. The gender makeup of the city was 48.1% male and 51.9% female.

=== 2000 census ===
As of the census of 2000, there were 1,431 people, 572 households, and 364 families living in the city. The population density was 5,463.1 inhabitants per square mile (2,109.3/km^{2}). There were 631 housing units at an average density of 2,409.0 per square mile (930.1/km^{2}). The racial makeup of the city was 61.50% White, 32.56% African American, 0.70% Native American, 0.77% Asian, 1.05% from other races, and 3.42% from two or more races. Hispanic or Latino of any race were 2.52% of the population.

There were 572 households, out of which 35.3% had children under the age of 18 living with them, 35.8% were married couples living together, 21.9% had a female householder with no husband present, and 36.2% were non-families. 27.6% of all households were made up of individuals, and 7.2% had someone living alone who was 65 years of age or older. The average household size was 2.50 and the average family size was 3.05.

In the city the population was spread out, with 28.9% under the age of 18, 11.3% from 18 to 24, 34.4% from 25 to 44, 17.0% from 45 to 64, and 8.4% who were 65 years of age or older. The median age was 30 years. For every 100 females, there were 95.0 males. For every 100 females age 18 and over, there were 87.6 males.

The median income for a household in the city was $36,493, and the median income for a family was $39,412. Males had a median income of $32,604 versus $25,143 for females. The per capita income for the city was $18,147. About 9.0% of families and 11.5% of the population were below the poverty line, including 15.1% of those under age 18 and 3.9% of those age 65 or over.
