= Airport Township, St. Louis County, Missouri =

Township in Missouri, U.S.

Coordinates: 39°15′15″N 91°12′59″W

Airport Township is a township in St. Louis County, in the U.S. state of Missouri. Its population was 35,821 as of the 2010 census.
