= Breckenridge Hills, Missouri =

- City
- Location of Breckenridge Hills, Missouri
- Coordinates: 38°42′56″N 90°22′07″W
- Country: United States
- State: Missouri
- County: St. Louis
- Townships: Midland, Airport
- Incorporated: 1950

Government
  - Type: City Council
  - Mayor: Jack Shrewsberry

Area
  - Total: 0.80 sq mi (2.07 km^{2})
  - Land: 0.80 sq mi (2.07 km^{2})
  - Water: 0 sq mi (0.00 km^{2})
- Elevation: 623 ft (190 m)

Population (2020)
  - Total: 4,458
  - Density: 5,566.6/sq mi (2,149.27/km^{2})
- Time zone: UTC-6 (Central (CST))
  - Summer (DST): UTC-5 (CDT)
- FIPS code: 29-08164
- GNIS feature ID: 2393407
- Website: breckenridge-hills.org

Breckenridge Hills is a city in St. Louis County, Missouri, United States. As of the 2020 census, the city population was 4,458.

== History ==
Breckenridge Hills became incorporated in 1950.

== Geography ==
According to the United States Census Bureau, the city has a total area of 0.81 square miles (2.10 km^{2}), all land.

== Demographics ==
Historical population
Census	Pop.	Note	%±
1950	4,063		—
1960	6,299		55.0%
1970	7,011		11.3%
1980	5,666		−19.2%
1990	5,404		−4.6%
2000	4,817		−10.9%
2010	4,746		−1.5%
2020	4,458		−6.1%
U.S. Decennial Census

=== Racial and ethnic composition ===
Breckenridge Hills city, Missouri – Racial and ethnic composition Note: the US Census treats Hispanic/Latino as an ethnic category. This table excludes Latinos from the racial categories and assigns them to a separate category. Hispanics/Latinos may be of any race.
Race / Ethnicity (NH = Non-Hispanic)	Pop 2000	Pop 2010	Pop 2020	% 2000	% 2010	% 2020
White alone (NH)	3,096	2,292	1,541	64.27%	48.29%	34.57%
Black or African American alone (NH)	1,377	1,535	1,476	28.59%	32.34%	33.11%
Native American or Alaska Native alone (NH)	10	5	15	0.21%	0.11%	0.34%
Asian alone (NH)	21	29	57	0.44%	0.61%	1.28%
Native Hawaiian or Pacific Islander alone (NH)	3	0	0	0.06%	0.00%	0.00%
Other race alone (NH)	9	9	23	0.19%	0.19%	0.52%
Mixed race or Multiracial (NH)	112	134	232	2.33%	2.82%	5.20%
Hispanic or Latino (any race)	189	742	1,114	3.92%	15.63%	24.99%
Total	4,817	4,746	4,458	100.00%	100.00%	100.00%

=== 2020 census ===
As of the 2020 census, Breckenridge Hills had a population of 4,458. The median age was 34.0 years. 25.4% of residents were under the age of 18 and 11.0% of residents were 65 years of age or older. For every 100 females there were 94.8 males, and for every 100 females age 18 and over there were 94.8 males age 18 and over.

100.0% of residents lived in urban areas, while 0.0% lived in rural areas.

There were 1,810 households in Breckenridge Hills, of which 32.5% had children under the age of 18 living in them. Of all households, 27.3% were married-couple households, 25.3% were households with a male householder and no spouse or partner present, and 38.0% were households with a female householder and no spouse or partner present. About 33.8% of all households were made up of individuals and 9.5% had someone living alone who was 65 years of age or older.

There were 2,118 housing units, of which 14.5% were vacant. The homeowner vacancy rate was 4.9% and the rental vacancy rate was 11.2%.

=== 2010 census ===
As of the census of 2010, there were 4,746 people, 1,911 households, and 1,138 families living in the city. The population density was 5,859.3 inhabitants per square mile (2,262.3/km^{2}). There were 2,128 housing units at an average density of 2,627.2 per square mile (1,014.4/km^{2}). The racial makeup of the city was 53.5% White, 32.7% African American, 0.4% Native American, 0.6% Asian, 0.1% Pacific Islander, 8.9% from other races, and 3.8% from two or more races. Hispanic or Latino of any race were 15.6% of the population.

There were 1,911 households, of which 35.4% had children under the age of 18 living with them, 27.2% were married couples living together, 24.3% had a female householder with no husband present, 8.1% had a male householder with no wife present, and 40.5% were non-families. 32.5% of all households were made up of individuals, and 8.9% had someone living alone who was 65 years of age or older. The average household size was 2.48 and the average family size was 3.12.

The median age in the city was 32.7 years. 26.9% of residents were under the age of 18; 10.7% were between the ages of 18 and 24; 28.7% were from 25 to 44; 24.6% were from 45 to 64; and 9.1% were 65 years of age or older. The gender makeup of the city was 48.5% male and 51.5% female.

=== 2000 census ===
As of the census of 2000, there were 4,817 people, 1,999 households, and 1,211 families living in the city. The population density was 5,890.1 inhabitants per square mile (2,274.2/km^{2}). There were 2,173 housing units at an average density of 2,657.1 per square mile (1,025.9/km^{2}). The racial makeup of the city was 65.89% White, 28.81% African American, 0.21% Native American, 0.46% Asian, 0.06% Pacific Islander, 2.12% from other races, and 2.45% from two or more races. Hispanic or Latino of any race were 3.92% of the population.

There were 1,999 households, out of which 31.8% had children under the age of 18 living with them, 33.4% were married couples living together, 22.3% had a female householder with no husband present, and 39.4% were non-families. 31.4% of all households were made up of individuals, and 8.2% had someone living alone who was 65 years of age or older. The average household size was 2.41 and the average family size was 3.04.

In the city, the population was spread out, with 27.6% under the age of 18, 10.0% from 18 to 24, 32.8% from 25 to 44, 19.1% from 45 to 64, and 10.6% who were 65 years of age or older. The median age was 33 years. For every 100 females, there were 89.6 males. For every 100 females age 18 and over, there were 85.3 males.

The median income for a household in the city was $34,671, and the median income for a family was $41,515. Males had a median income of $27,487 versus $22,743 for females. The per capita income for the city was $16,847. About 15.2% of families and 17.3% of the population were below the poverty line, including 22.8% of those under age 18 and 10.5% of those age 65 or over.
