= Overland, Missouri =

- City
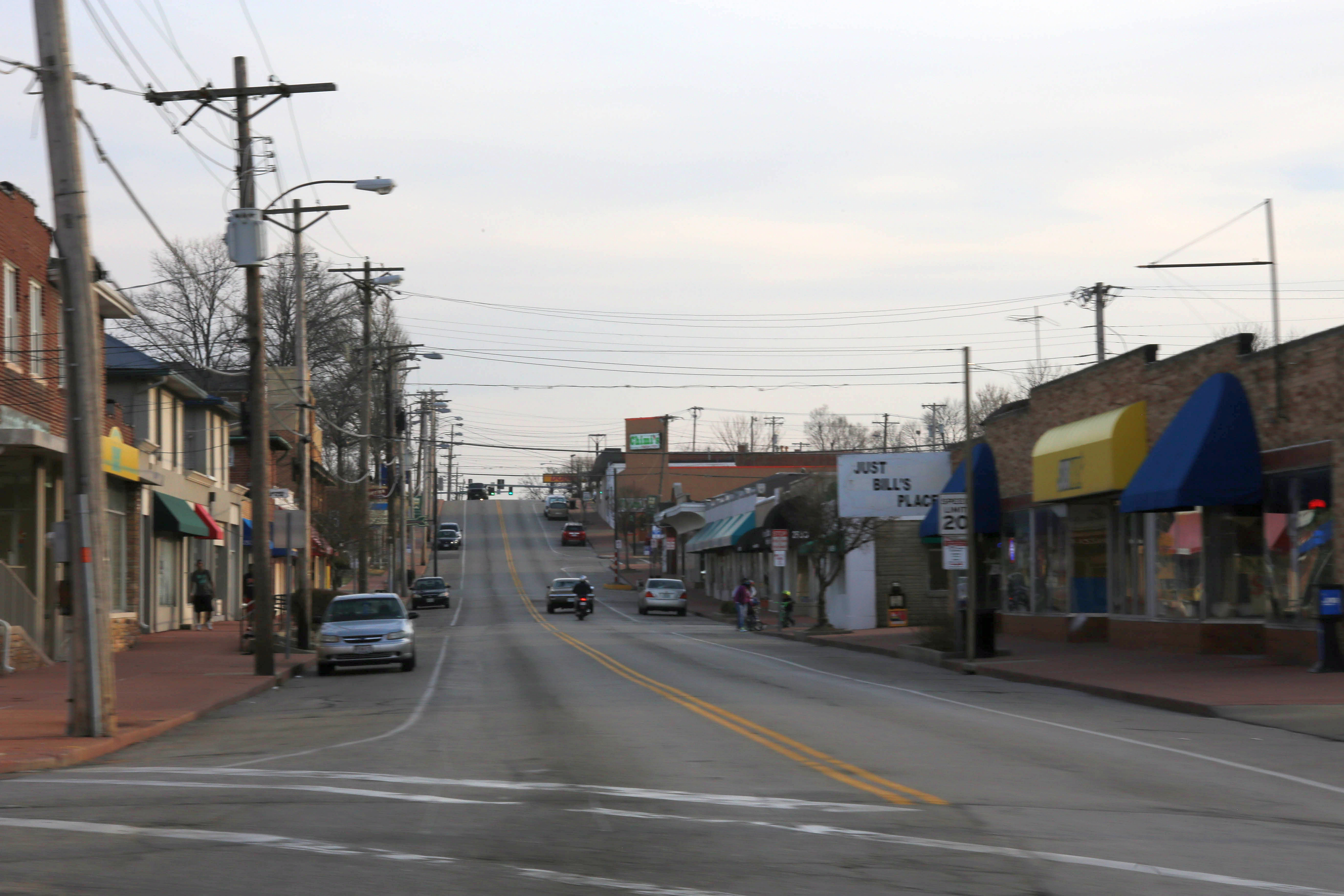
- Downtown Overland
- Nickname: Trampoline City
- Location of Overland, Missouri
- Coordinates: 38°41′55″N 90°22′09″W
- Country: United States
- State: Missouri
- County: St. Louis

Area
  - Total: 4.41 sq mi (11.41 km^{2})
  - Land: 4.39 sq mi (11.37 km^{2})
  - Water: 0.015 sq mi (0.04 km^{2})
- Elevation: 650 ft (200 m)

Population (2020)
  - Total: 15,955
  - Density: 3,635.1/sq mi (1,403.53/km^{2})
- Time zone: UTC-6 (Central (CST))
  - Summer (DST): UTC-5 (CDT)
- FIPS code: 29-55550
- GNIS feature ID: 2396112
- Website: www.overlandmo.org

Overland is a city in St. Louis County, Missouri, United States. The population was 15,955 at the 2020 census.

== History ==
The area south of the King's Road to St. Charles was first settled in the early 1820s, when travelers westward from St. Louis would stop overnight at what became known as "The Overland Park". Daniel Boone constructed a single room cabin here, near the current location of Lake Sherwood and Wyland Elementary School.

In time, businesses were established and a one-room subscription school, the Buck School, was built in 1846. In 1867, the Ritenour School District was organized. In 1919, the town's name was shortened to "Overland", to avoid postal confusion with the city of Overland Park, Kansas.

The town was incorporated as a fourth class city in 1939 with a mayoral-city council government. In the 1990s, the city voters approved a change to a third class city. In 2007, the city voted to move to a mayor-council-administrator form of government. Under this structure, the mayor serves as the chief elected official. The city council serves as the legislative body, and is empowered to pass ordinances and resolutions it deems necessary to the operation of the city. The city administrator is a full-time employee of the city, and executes the day-to-day tasks of operations.

The 1.6-million-square foot six-story Military Personnel Records Center, built in 1956 for the United States Department of Defense, later became part of the National Archives and Records Service in the General Services Administration. On July 12, 1973, a huge fire destroyed an estimated 16 to 18 million personnel files, mostly for the 50 years prior to 1963. The incident was believed to be the largest single loss of government records in the country's history.

On April 3, 2007, Overland residents voted to recall Mayor Ann Purzner, who had been accused of lying about her career credentials and exceeding her power as mayor. She was temporarily replaced by Alderman Jerry May, and in the August 2007 election, Councilman Mike Schneider was elected mayor.

== Geography ==
According to the United States Census Bureau, the city has a total area of 4.38 square miles (11.34 km^{2}), of which 4.36 square miles (11.29 km^{2}) is land and 0.02 square miles (0.05 km^{2}) is water.

== Demographics ==
Historical population
Census	Pop.	Note	%±
1940	2,934		—
1950	11,566		294.2%
1960	22,763		96.8%
1970	24,819		9.0%
1980	19,620		−20.9%
1990	17,987		−8.3%
2000	16,838		−6.4%
2010	16,062		−4.6%
2020	15,955		−0.7%
U.S. Decennial Census

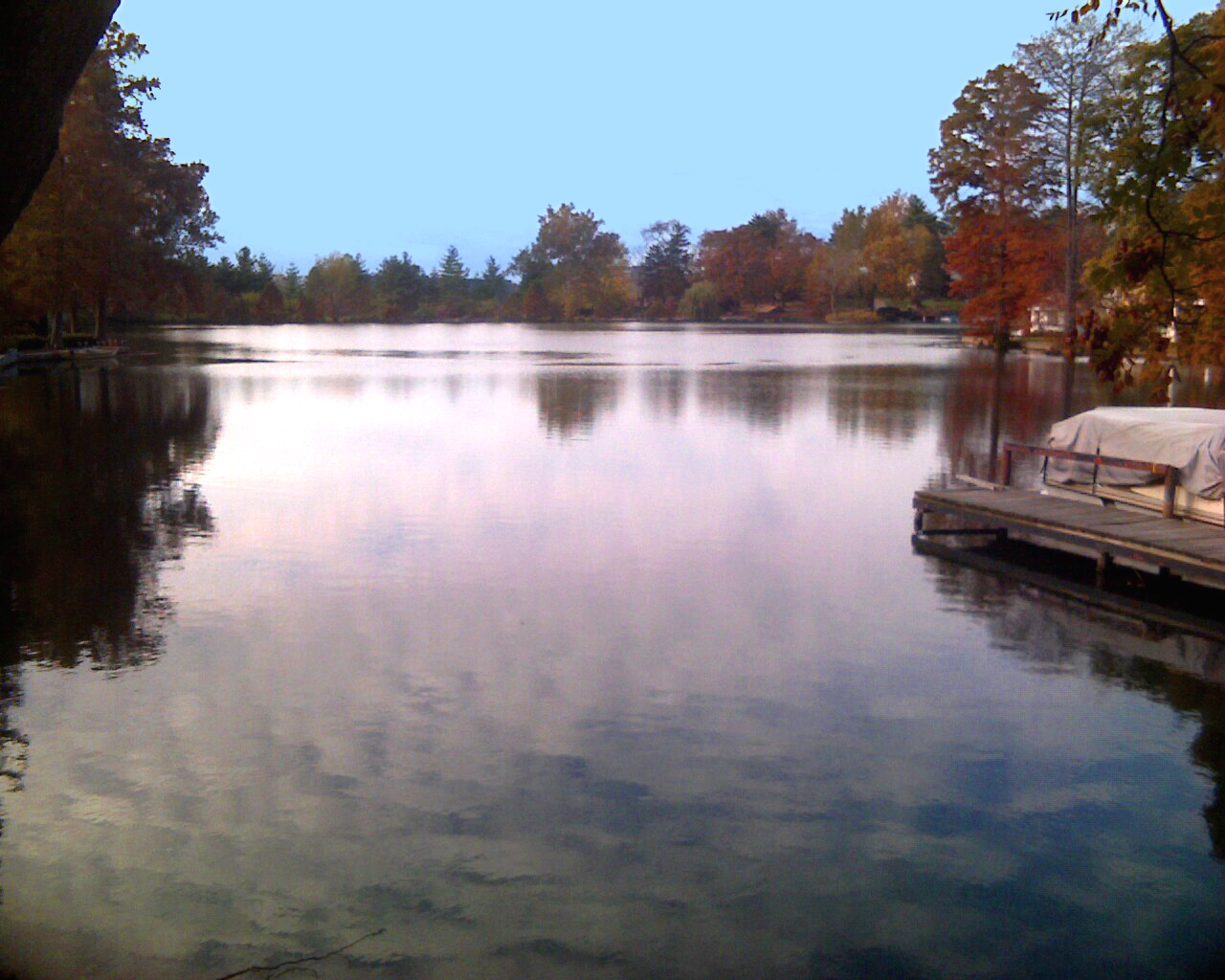
Lake Sherwood in Overland

=== Racial and ethnic composition ===
Overland city, Missouri – Racial and ethnic composition Note: the US Census treats Hispanic/Latino as an ethnic category. This table excludes Latinos from the racial categories and assigns them to a separate category. Hispanics/Latinos may be of any race.
Race / Ethnicity (NH = Non-Hispanic)	Pop 2000	Pop 2010	Pop 2020	% 2000	% 2010	% 2020
White alone (NH)	13,875	11,448	8,676	82.40%	71.27%	54.38%
Black or African American alone (NH)	1,880	2,590	3,597	11.17%	16.13%	22.54%
Native American or Alaska Native alone (NH)	51	39	36	0.30%	0.24%	0.23%
Asian alone (NH)	329	510	514	1.95%	3.18%	3.22%
Native Hawaiian or Pacific Islander alone (NH)	5	2	1	0.03%	0.01%	0.01%
Other race alone (NH)	25	41	122	0.15%	0.26%	0.76%
Mixed race or Multiracial (NH)	305	405	920	1.81%	2.52%	5.77%
Hispanic or Latino (any race)	368	1,027	2,089	2.19%	6.39%	13.09%
Total	16,838	16,062	15,955	100.00%	100.00%	100.00%

=== 2020 census ===
As of the 2020 census, Overland had a population of 15,955. The median age was 38.8 years. 21.4% of residents were under the age of 18 and 15.3% of residents were 65 years of age or older. For every 100 females there were 96.1 males, and for every 100 females age 18 and over there were 93.5 males age 18 and over.

100.0% of residents lived in urban areas, while 0.0% lived in rural areas.

There were 6,673 households in Overland, of which 27.3% had children under the age of 18 living in them. Of all households, 34.7% were married-couple households, 23.1% were households with a male householder and no spouse or partner present, and 33.6% were households with a female householder and no spouse or partner present. About 32.3% of all households were made up of individuals and 10.7% had someone living alone who was 65 years of age or older.

There were 7,287 housing units, of which 8.4% were vacant. The homeowner vacancy rate was 2.9% and the rental vacancy rate was 7.9%.

=== Income and poverty ===
The 2016–2020 5-year American Community Survey estimates show that the median household income was $46,109 (with a margin of error of +/- $4,527) and the median family income was $55,738 (+/- $5,511). Males had a median income of $31,029 (+/- $3,054) versus $28,360 (+/- $1,908) for females. The median income for those above 16 years old was $29,671 (+/- $1,514). Approximately, 7.9% of families and 11.1% of the population were below the poverty line, including 14.6% of those under the age of 18 and 7.6% of those ages 65 or over.

=== 2010 census ===
As of the census of 2010, there were 16,062 people, 6,717 households, and 4,136 families living in the city. The population density was 3,683.9 inhabitants per square mile (1,422.4/km^{2}). There were 7,356 housing units at an average density of 1,687.2 per square mile (651.4/km^{2}). The racial makeup of the city was 73.3% White, 16.4% African American, 0.3% Native American, 3.2% Asian, 3.9% from other races, and 3.0% from two or more races. Hispanic or Latino of any race were 6.4% of the population.

There were 6,717 households, of which 30.2% had children under the age of eighteen living with them, 37.5% were married couples living together, 17.7% had a female householder with no husband present, 6.3% had a male householder with no wife present, and 38.4% were non-families. 30.8% of all households were made up of individuals, and 9.6% had someone living alone who was 65 years of age or older. The average household size was 2.38 and the average family size was 2.96.

The median age in the city was 37.9 years. 22.4% of residents were under the age of eighteen; 8.7% were between the ages of 18 and 24; 28% were from 25 to 44; 28.3% were from 45 to 64; and 12.7% were 65 years of age or older. The gender makeup of the city was 49.0% male and 51.0% female.

=== 2000 census ===
As of the census of 2000, there were 16,838 people, 7,012 households, and 4,494 families living in the city. The population density was 3,842.8 inhabitants per square mile (1,483.7/km^{2}). There were 7,446 housing units at an average density of 1,699.3 per square mile (656.1/km^{2}). The racial makeup of the city was 83.56% White, 11.19% African American, 0.32% Native American, 2.01% Asian, 0.03% Pacific Islander, 0.83% from other races, and 2.05% from two or more races. Hispanic or Latino of any race were 2.19% of the population.

There were 7,012 households, out of which 29.7% had children under the age of 18 living with them, 42.8% were married couples living together, 16.4% had a female householder with no husband present, and 35.9% were non-families. 29.7% of all households were made up of individuals, and 11.6% had someone living alone who was 65 years of age or older. The average household size was 2.40 and the average family size was 2.96.

In the city, the population was spread out, with 24.7% under the age of 18, 8.3% from 18 to 24, 30.9% from 25 to 44, 21.0% from 45 to 64, and 15.1% who were 65 years of age or older. The median age was 37 years. For every 100 females age 18 and over, there were 89.2 males.

The median income for a household in the city was $34,437, and the median income for a family was $43,655. Males had a median income of $31,168 versus $25,352 for females. The per capita income for the city was $18,266. About 6.6% of families and 9.7% of the population were below the poverty line, including 13.8% of those under age 18 and 3.6% of those age 65 or over.

== Economy ==
Build-A-Bear Workshop was headquartered until 2020 in Overland, and concentrate manufacturing operations for Dr Pepper Snapple Group are located in Overland. Overland is less than five miles from the St. Louis Boeing plant, Monsanto and Emerson Electric, where many Overland residents are employed. Overland supports a healthy and prosperous retail district.

Overland was the location of the National Personnel Records Center, which houses discharged and retired service records of all branches of the United States armed forces. The city was also the location of the Army Human Resources Command (HRC), prior to the facility's closing as a result of the military's 2005 Base Realignment and Closure process. The former Army HRC building is now called the Charles F. Prevedel Federal Building and is home to offices of the Department of Veterans Affairs and Department of Agriculture.

== Arts and culture ==
The following properties in Overland have been identified as county landmarks:

- Lackland House, built around 1844, with 13 glass panes at the front door and 13 crossbars on the front porch, to commemorate the original 13 states.
- Alexander McElhinney Log House, a dogtrot log home built in the 1850s; moved and restored in the 1980s.
- Wild Acres Park, a 31.5-acre (12.7 ha) estate and Renaissance Revival home built in 1907; purchased by the city and opened as Wild Acres Park in 1995.
- Gocke-Vance House, a fireproof home built in 1910, based on a Frank Lloyd Wright design.

The U.S. Army Publications Distribution Center in Overland is listed on the National Register of Historic Places.

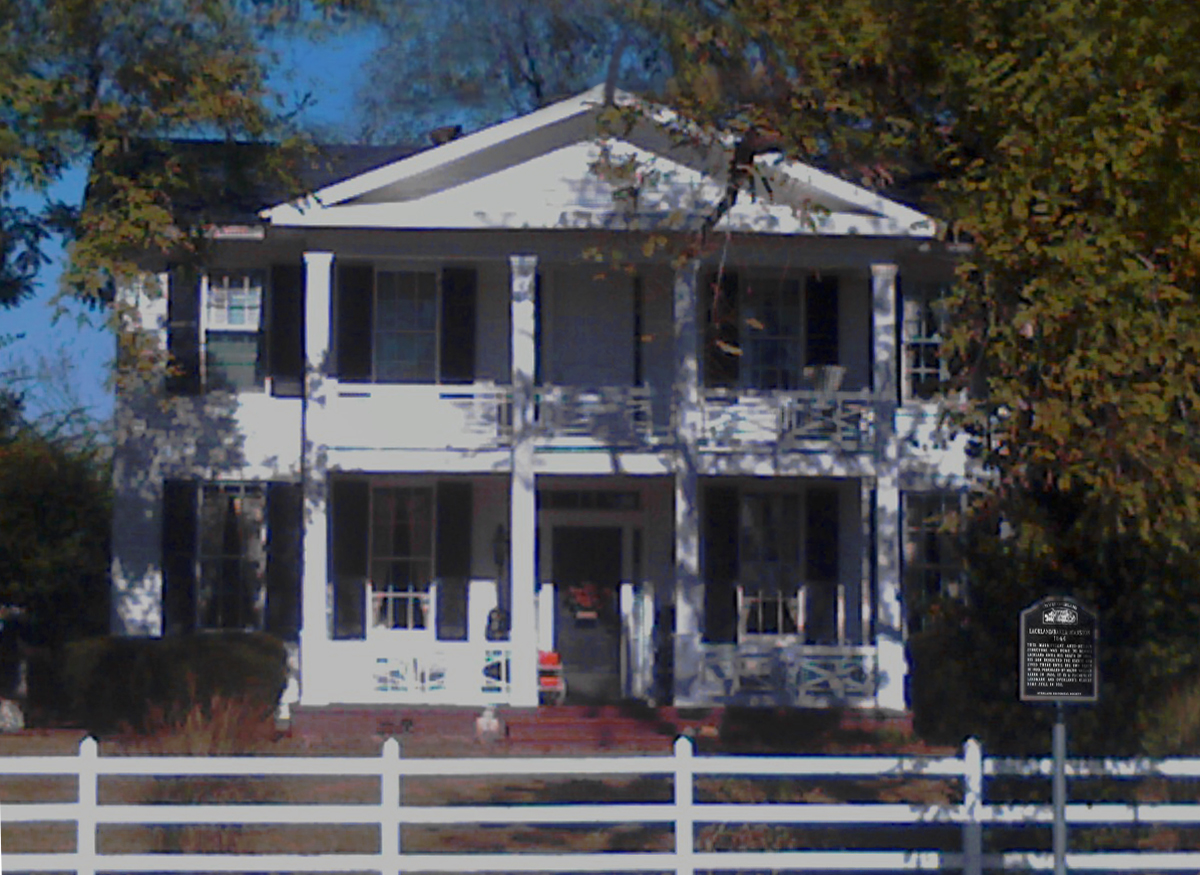
Lackland House

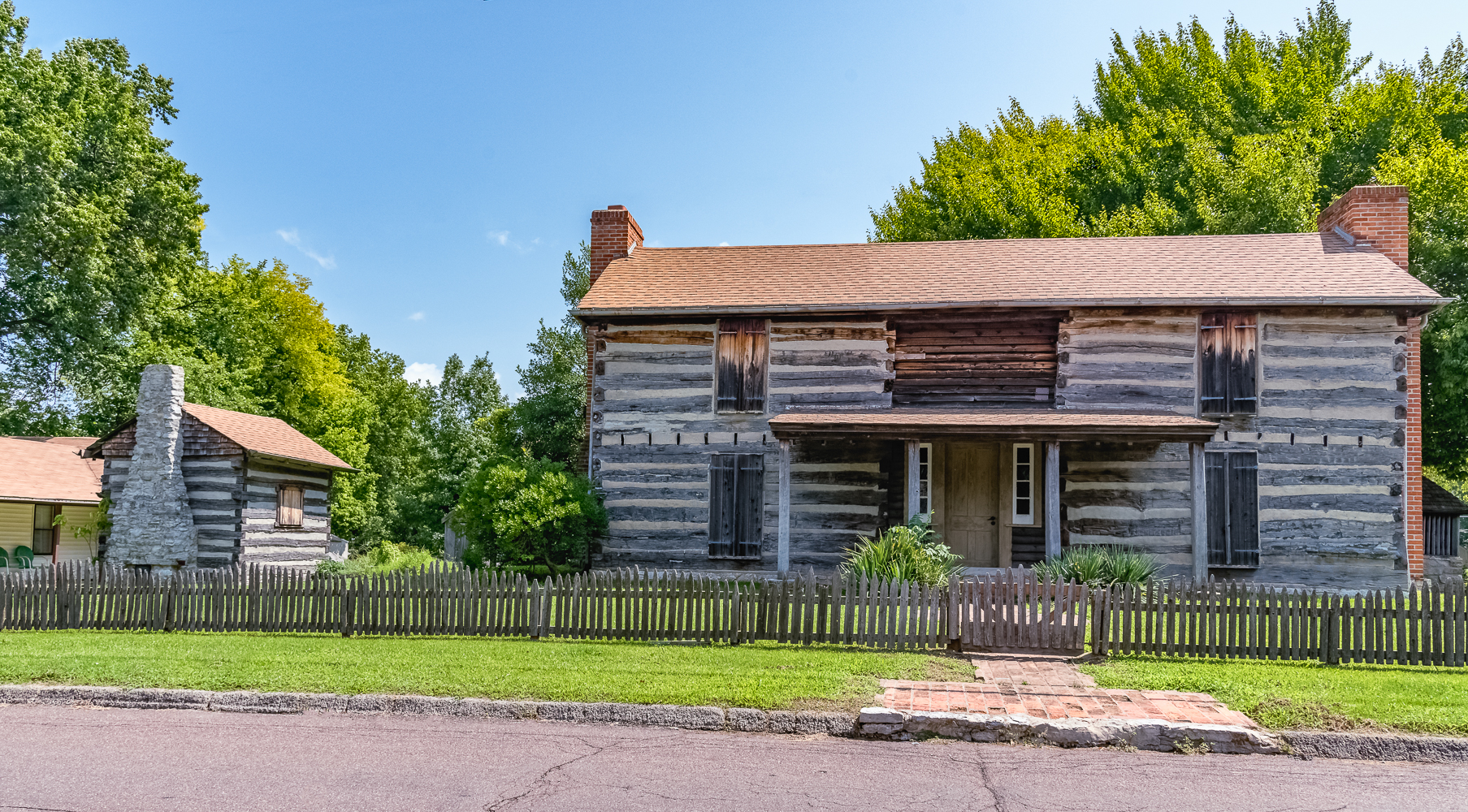
Alexander McElhinney Log House

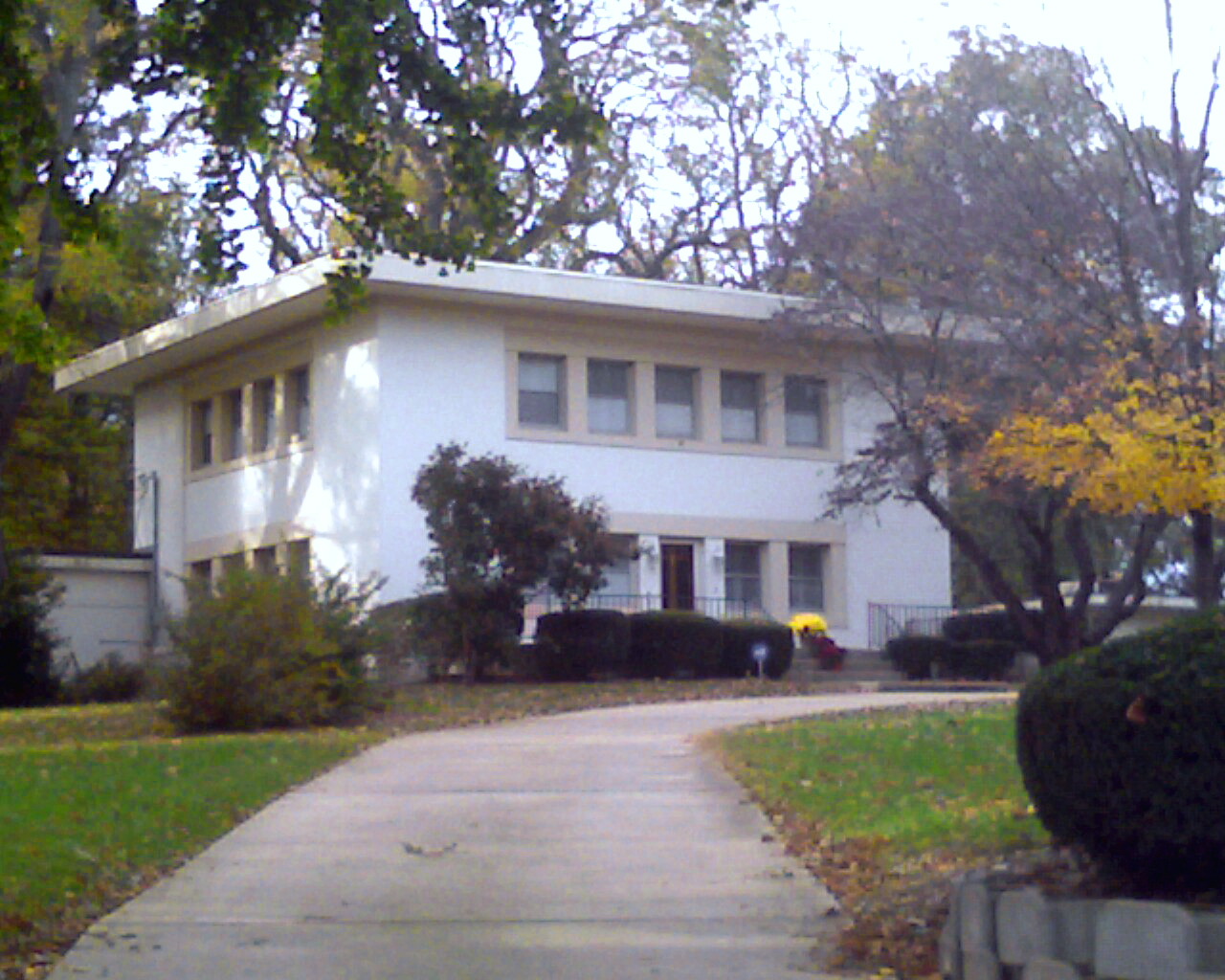
Gocke-Vance House

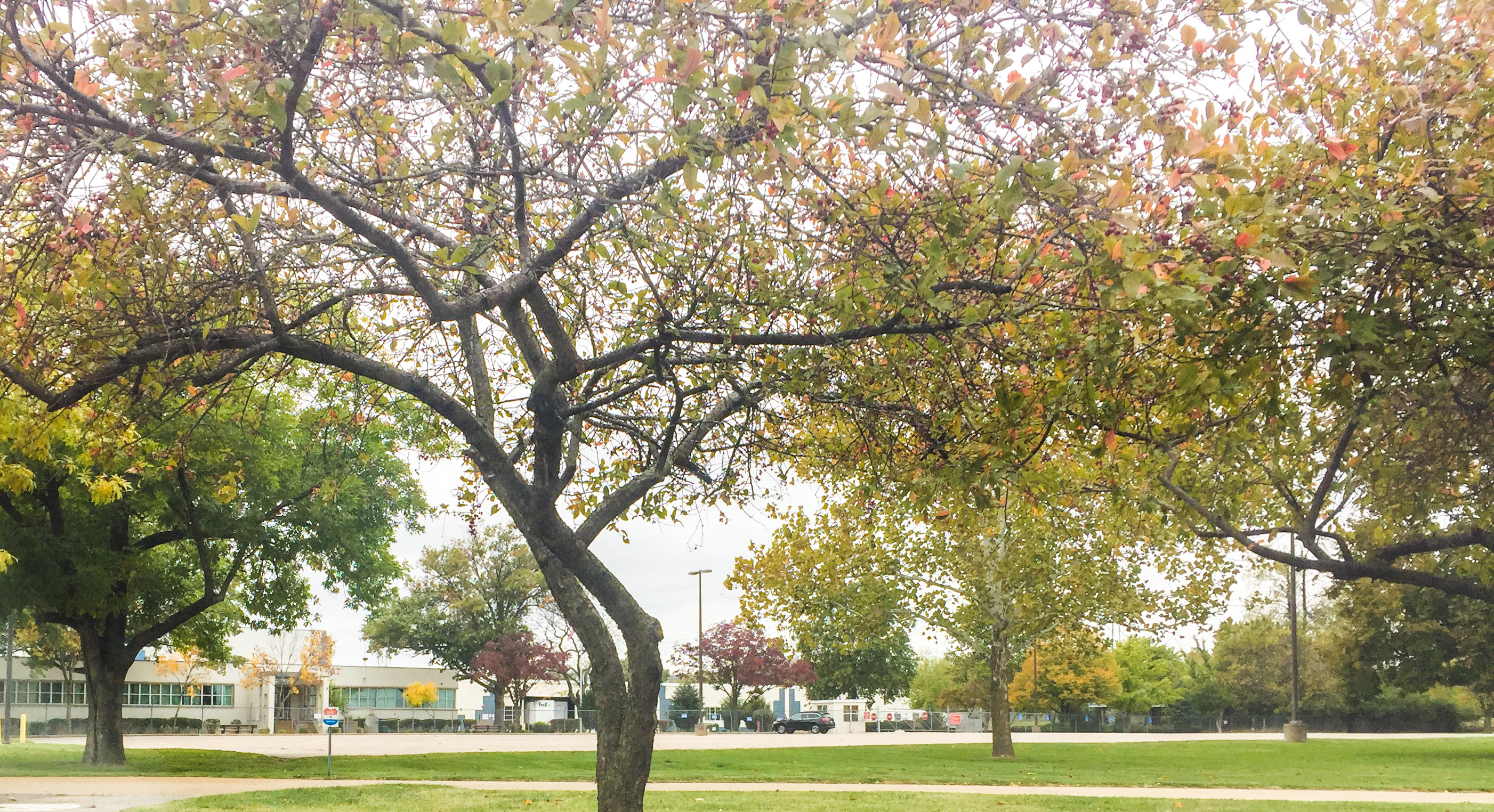
U.S. Army Publications Distribution Center

== Education ==
The Ritenour School District serves the city.

== Notable people ==
- Maj. Gen. James L. Day, USMC, Medal of Honor recipient
- Ron Hunt, major league baseball second baseman
- Mike Keefe, editorial cartoonist for The Denver Post
- Ted Kulongoski, Governor of Oregon 2003–2011
- Gene Louis, drummer and lead singer of Bullets and Octane
- Dan Marsala, lead singer of Story of the Year
- Jerry Reuss, major league baseball pitcher and broadcaster
- Bob Scheffing, major league baseball catcher, manager of Detroit Tigers and Chicago Cubs, general manager of New York Mets
- Dave Spence, businessman and Republican nominee for Governor of Missouri in 2012
- Bob Todd, retired head baseball coach at Ohio State University
- Billie Lou Watt, stage and television actress
- Patrick Wroblewski, politician, mayor
- T.S. Eliot, writer
