= Woodson Terrace, Missouri =

- City
- Location of Woodson Terrace, Missouri
- Coordinates: 38°43′43″N 90°21′36″W
- Country: United States
- State: Missouri
- County: St. Louis

Area
  - Total: 0.78 sq mi (2.01 km^{2})
  - Land: 0.78 sq mi (2.01 km^{2})
  - Water: 0 sq mi (0.00 km^{2})
- Elevation: 594 ft (181 m)

Population (2020)
  - Total: 3,950
  - Density: 5,099.0/sq mi (1,968.75/km^{2})
- Time zone: UTC-6 (Central (CST))
  - Summer (DST): UTC-5 (CDT)
- FIPS code: 29-80962
- GNIS feature ID: 2397371
- Website: www.woodsonterrace.net

Woodson Terrace is a city in St. Louis County, Missouri, United States. As of the 2020 census, Woodson Terrace had a population of 3,950.

== Geography ==
According to the United States Census Bureau, the city has a total area of 0.77 square miles (1.99 km^{2}), all land.

== Demographics ==
Historical population
Census	Pop.	Note	%±
1950	616		—
1960	6,048		881.8%
1970	5,880		−2.8%
1980	4,788		−18.6%
1990	4,362		−8.9%
2000	4,189		−4.0%
2010	4,063		−3.0%
2020	3,950		−2.8%
U.S. Decennial Census

=== Racial and ethnic composition ===
Woodson Terrace city, Missouri – Racial and ethnic composition Note: the US Census treats Hispanic/Latino as an ethnic category. This table excludes Latinos from the racial categories and assigns them to a separate category. Hispanics/Latinos may be of any race.
Race / Ethnicity (NH = Non-Hispanic)	Pop 2000	Pop 2010	Pop 2020	% 2000	% 2010	% 2020
White alone (NH)	4,189	2,630	1,763	83.15%	64.73%	44.63%
Black or African American alone (NH)	484	831	1,086	11.55%	20.45%	27.49%
Native American or Alaska Native alone (NH)	5	9	16	0.12%	0.22%	0.41%
Asian alone (NH)	41	58	78	0.98%	1.43%	1.97%
Pacific Islander or Native Hawaiian alone (NH)	0	1	3	0.00%	0.02%	0.08%
Other race alone (NH)	9	2	31	0.21%	0.05%	0.78%
Mixed race or Multiracial (NH)	63	103	245	1.50%	2.54%	6.20%
Hispanic or Latino (any race)	104	429	728	2.48%	10.56%	18.43%
Total	4,189	4,063	3,950	100.00%	100.00%	100.00%

=== 2020 census ===
As of the 2020 census, Woodson Terrace had a population of 3,950. The median age was 35.9 years. 24.2% of residents were under the age of 18 and 12.5% of residents were 65 years of age or older. For every 100 females there were 96.9 males, and for every 100 females age 18 and over there were 90.9 males age 18 and over.

100.0% of residents lived in urban areas, while 0.0% lived in rural areas.

There were 1,560 households in Woodson Terrace, of which 31.1% had children under the age of 18 living in them. Of all households, 33.4% were married-couple households, 21.8% were households with a male householder and no spouse or partner present, and 35.8% were households with a female householder and no spouse or partner present. About 29.6% of all households were made up of individuals and 10.0% had someone living alone who was 65 years of age or older.

There were 1,699 housing units, of which 8.2% were vacant. The homeowner vacancy rate was 1.8% and the rental vacancy rate was 13.5%.

=== 2010 census ===
As of the census of 2010, there were 4,063 people, 1,603 households, and 1,019 families living in the city. The population density was 5,276.6 inhabitants per square mile (2,037.3/km^{2}). There were 1,731 housing units at an average density of 2,248.1 per square mile (868.0/km^{2}). The racial makeup of the city was 68.5% White, 20.8% African American, 0.3% Native American, 1.5% Asian, 5.8% from other races, and 3.2% from two or more races. Hispanic or Latino of any race were 10.6% of the population.

There were 1,603 households, of which 33.1% had children under the age of 18 living with them, 35.5% were married couples living together, 21.3% had a female householder with no husband present, 6.8% had a male householder with no wife present, and 36.4% were non-families. 28.8% of all households were made up of individuals, and 9.9% had someone living alone who was 65 years of age or older. The average household size was 2.53 and the average family size was 3.12.

The median age in the city was 34.6 years. 25.2% of residents were under the age of 18; 9.2% were between the ages of 18 and 24; 28% were from 25 to 44; 25.6% were from 45 to 64; and 11.8% were 65 years of age or older. The gender makeup of the city was 48.2% male and 51.8% female.

=== 2000 census ===
As of the census of 2000, there were 4,189 people, 1,689 households, and 1,102 families living in the city. The population density was 5,346.2 inhabitants per square mile (2,064.2/km^{2}). There were 1,776 housing units at an average density of 2,266.6 per square mile (875.1/km^{2}). The racial makeup of the city was 84.36% White, 11.60% African American, 0.14% Native American, 1.00% Asian, 1.24% from other races, and 1.65% from two or more races. Hispanic or Latino of any race were 2.48% of the population.

There were 1,689 households, out of which 30.6% had children under the age of 18 living with them, 43.4% were married couples living together, 16.7% had a female householder with no husband present, and 34.7% were non-families. 28.2% of all households were made up of individuals, and 11.0% had someone living alone who was 65 years of age or older. The average household size was 2.48 and the average family size was 3.04.

In the city, the population was spread out, with 25.5% under the age of 18, 9.1% from 18 to 24, 30.5% from 25 to 44, 20.0% from 45 to 64, and 14.8% who were 65 years of age or older. The median age was 36 years. For every 100 females, there were 92.9 males. For every 100 females age 18 and over, there were 88.1 males.

The median income for a household in the city was $36,363, and the median income for a family was $40,603. Males had a median income of $32,444 versus $23,842 for females. The per capita income for the city was $18,581. About 5.9% of families and 7.7% of the population were below the poverty line, including 9.9% of those under age 18 and none of those age 65 or over.
