= Midland Township, St. Louis County, Missouri =

Township in the US state of Missouri

Coordinates: 38°42′15″N 90°22′5″W

Midland Township is a township in St. Louis County, Missouri, United States. Its population was 34,646 as of the 2010 census.
