= Municipalities of St. Louis County, Missouri =

St. Louis County has 88 municipalities and 10 unincorporated census-designated places:

== List by population and area ==
Municipality	Population	Total Area (mi2)	Population Density/sq mi
Ballwin	31,283	8.95	3,494.6
Bella Villa	687	0.1	5,468.3
Bellefontaine Neighbors	11,271	4.4	2,573.2
Bellerive	254	0.4	713.0
Bel-Nor	1,598	0.6	2,555.5
Bel-Ridge	3,082	0.8	3,799.0
Berkeley	10,063	4.9	2,040.6
Beverly Hills	603	0.1	6,882.0
Black Jack	6,792	2.7	2,553.3
Breckenridge Hills	4,817	0.8	5,890.1
Brentwood	7,693	1.9	3,948.4
Bridgeton	15,550	15.2	1,067.1
Calverton Park	1,322	0.4	3,154.5
Champ	12	0.8	14.4
Charlack	1,431	0.3	5,463.1
Chesterfield	46,635	32.7	1,485.4
Clarkson Valley	2,675	2.7	995.1
Clayton	16,061	2.5	5,164.4
Cool Valley	1,081	0.5	2,244.1
Country Club Hills	1,381	0.2	7,761.7
Country Life Acres	81	0.1	725.5
Crestwood	11,863	3.6	3,296.2
Creve Coeur	16,500	10.1	1,628.9
Crystal Lake Park	457	0.1	4,787.5
Dellwood	5,255	1.0	5,108.2
Des Peres	8,592	4.4	1,954.3
Edmundson	840	0.3	3,018.0
Ellisville	9,104	4.3	2,094.1
Eureka	7,676	10.1	763.7
Fenton	4,360	6.4	710.7
Ferguson	22,406	6.19	3,620.6
Flordell Hills	931	0.1	8,111.7
Florissant	51,812	11.7	4,442.4
Frontenac	3,483	2.9	1,221.3
Glendale	5,767	1.3	4,474.6
Grantwood Village	883	0.8	1,054.1
Greendale	722	0.2	3,480.3
Green Park	2,666	1.4	1,909.0
Hanley Hills	2,101	0.36	5,836.1
Hazelwood	26,206	15.88	1,649.9
Hillsdale	1,477	0.3	4,226.3
Huntleigh	323	1.0	324.4
Jennings	15,469	3.7	4,193.3
Kinloch	449	0.7	616.5
Kirkwood	27,324	9.23	2,961.3
Ladue	8,645	8.6	414.0
Lakeshire	4,387	2.28	2,160.0
Manchester	19,161	5.0	3,834.6
Maplewood	9,228	1.5	5,963.8
Marlborough	2,235	0.2	9,829.4
Maryland Heights	25,756	21.39	1,204.4
Castle Point	2,710	10.07	3,107.5
Moline Acres	2,662	0.6	4,720.6
Normandy	5,153	1.8	2,826.3
Northwoods	4,643	0.7	6,545.7
Norwood Court	1,061	0.1	7,783.2
Oakland	1,540	0.6	2,545.7
Olivette	7,438	2.8	2,667.5
Overland	16,838	4.4	3,842.8
Pagedale	3,616	1.2	3,003.8
Pasadena Hills	1,147	0.2	5,044.0
Pasadena Park	489	0.1	5,506.5
Pine Lawn	4,204	0.6	6,942.5
Richmond Heights	9,602	2.3	4,191.5
Riverview	3,146	0.8	3,932.5
Rock Hill	4,609	1.1	4,190.0
Shrewsbury	6,644	1.4	4,655.4
St. Ann	13,607	3.1	4,352.8
St. John	6,871	1.4	4,825.8
Sunset Hills	8,267	9.0	915.3
Sycamore Hills	722	0.1	5,249.0
Town and Country	10,894	11.9	916.8
Twin Oaks	362	0.3	1,403.8
University City	37,428	5.88	6,363.1
Uplands Park	460	0.1	6,904.3
Valley Park	6,518	3.2	2,156.2
Velda City	1,616	0.2	9,872.7
Velda Village Hills	1,090	0.1	9,235.6
Vinita Park	1,924	0.7	2,628.7
Warson Woods	1,983	0.6	3,352.6
Webster Groves	23,230	5.90	3,937.5
Wellston	2,460	0.9	2,732.6
Westwood	284	0.6	453.7
Wilbur Park	475	0.1	7,882.2
Wildwood	32,884	66.03	498.0
Winchester	1,651	0.2	6,723.0
Woodson Terrace	4,189	0.8	5,346.2

== General information ==
Municipality	Points of Interest	Status	Image	Map	Description
Affton		Census Designated Place			
Ballwin		City	Vlasis Park, Ballwin		
Bella Villa		City			
Bellefontaine Neighbors		City	Bellefontaine Road		
Bellerive		Village			
Bel-Nor		Village			
Bel-Ridge		Village	Ladies of Charity Service Center		
Berkeley		City			
Beverly Hills		City	Beverly Hills Shopping Center		
Black Jack		City			
Breckenridge Hills		City			
Brentwood		City	Former Missouri College building		
Bridgeton		City			
Calverton Park		City			
Carsonville		Unincorporated place			
Castle Point		Census Designated Place / Not an incorporated municipality			
Champ		Village			
Charlack		City			
Chesterfield		City	Chesterfield Mall		
Clarkson Valley		City			
Clayton		City			
Concord		Census Designated Place			
Cool Valley		City			
Country Club Hills		City			
Country Life Acres		Village			
Crestwood		City			
Creve Coeur		City	Temple Emanuel		
Crystal Lake Park		City			
Dellwood		City			
Des Peres		City	Des Peres City Hall		
Edmundson		City			
Ellisville		City			
Eureka	Six Flags St. Louis	City	Highway 66 Bridge		
Fenton		Town	A bicycle party resting in Fenton 1897		
Ferguson		City	Church Street		
Flordell Hills		City			
Florissant		City	Jamestown Mall		
Frontenac		City	Plaza Frontenac		
Glasgow Village		Census Designated Place / Not an incorporated municipality			
Glencoe		Unincorporated community			
Glendale		City			
Grantwood Village		Village			
Greendale		City			
Green Park		City			
Grover		Unincorporated community			
Hanley Hills		Village			
Hazelwood		City			
Hillsdale		Village			
Huntleigh		City			
Jennings		City			
Kinloch		City			
Kirkwood		City			
Ladue		City			
Lakeshire		City			
Lemay		Census Designated Place / Not an incorporated municipality			
Manchester		City			
Maplewood		City			
Marlborough		Village			
Maryland Heights		City			
Mehlville		Census Designated Place / Not an incorporated municipality			
Moline Acres		City			
Normandy		City			
Northwoods		City			
Norwood Court		Village			
Oakland		City			
Oakville		Census Designated Place / Not an incorporated municipality			
Old Jamestown		Census Designated Place / Not an incorporated municipality			
Olivette		City			
Overland		City			
Pagedale		City			
Pasadena Hills		Village			
Pasadena Park		Village			
Peerless Park		Unincorporated community			
Pine Lawn		City			
Pond		Populated place			
Richmond Heights		City			
Riverview		Village			
Rock Hill		City			
Sappington		Census Designated Place / Not an incorporated municipality			
Sherman		Unincorporated community			
Shrewsbury		City			
Spanish Lake		Census Designated Place / Not an incorporated municipality			
St. Ann		City			
St. George		Census Designated Place (Disincorporated 2011)			
St. John		City			
Sunset Hills		City			
Sycamore Hills		Village			
Times Beach		Ghost town			
Town and Country		City			
Twin Oaks		Village			
University City		City			
Uplands Park		Village			
Valley Park		City			
Velda City		City			
Velda Village Hills		Village			
Vinita Park		City			
Warson Woods		City			
Webster Groves		City			
Wellston		City			
Westwood		Village			
Wilbur Park		Village			
Wildwood		City			
Winchester		City			
Woodson Terrace		City			
