= Missouri's 1st congressional district =

U.S. House district for Missouri

Coordinates: 38°43′42″N 90°17′46″W

- Interactive map of district boundaries since January 3, 2023
- Representative: Wesley Bell; D–Clayton
- Distribution: 99.21% urban; 0.79% rural
- Population (2025): 740,170
- Median household income: $63,129
- Ethnicity: 46.1% Black; 40.4% White; 4.5% Hispanic; 4.3% Two or more races; 3.8% Asian; 0.8% other
- Cook PVI: D+29

Missouri's 1st congressional district is in the eastern portion of the state. It includes all of St. Louis City and much of northern St. Louis County, including the cities of Maryland Heights, University City, Ferguson and Florissant. With a Cook Partisan Voting Index rating of D+29, it is the most Democratic U.S. congressional district in Missouri and is tied with Colorado's 1st congressional district as the 16th most Democratic nationwide. Roughly half of the district's population is African American.

Its current representative is Democrat Wesley Bell, the former St. Louis County district attorney. Bell was first elected in 2024 after defeating two-term congresswoman Cori Bush. Bush herself had toppled ten-term incumbent William Lacy Clay, Jr., who had previously represented the district between 2001 and 2021, succeeding his father, William Lacy Clay, Sr.

== Recent election results from statewide races ==
Year	Office	Results
2008	President	Obama 78–21%
2012	President	Obama 78–22%
2012	Senate	McCaskill 82–15%
2012	Governor	Nixon 79–18%
2016	President	Clinton 75–21%
2016	Senate	Kander 77–19%
2016	Governor	Koster 76–21%
2016	Lt. Governor	Carnahan 75–21%
2016	Secretary of State	Smith 73–24%
2016	Attorney General	Hensley 75–25%
2018	Senate	McCaskill 80–18%
2018	Auditor	Galloway 81–16%
2020	President	Biden 78–20%
2020	Governor	Galloway 77–21%
2020	Lt. Governor	Canady 75–22%
2020	Secretary of State	Faleti 74–24%
2020	Treasurer	Englund 74–23%
2020	Attorney General	Finneran 75–23%
2022	Senate	Busch Valentine 79–20%
2024	President	Harris 78–21%
2024	Senate	Kunce 77–19%
2024	Governor	Quade 75–22%
2024	Lt. Governor	Brown 75–20%
2024	Secretary of State	Phifer 77–20%
2024	Treasurer	Osmack 75–22%
2024	Attorney General	Gross 76–22%

== Composition ==
For the 118th and successive Congresses (based on redistricting following the 2020 census), the district contains all or portions of the following counties and communities:

Independent cities (1)

St. Louis

St. Louis County (59)

Bellefontaine Neighbors, Bellerive Acres, Bel-Nor, Bel-Ridge, Berkeley, Beverly Hills, Black Jack, Brentwood (part; also 2nd), Bridgeton, Calverton Park, Castle Point, Champ, Charlack, Clayton, Cool Valley, Country Club Hills, Creve Coeur (part; also 2nd), Delwood, Edmundson, Ferguson, Flordell Hills, Florissant, Frontenac (part; also 2nd), Glasgow Village, Glendale (part; also 2nd), Glen Echo Park, Greendale, Hanley Hills, Hazelwood, Hillsdale, Jennings, Kinloch, Ladue (part; also 2nd), Maryland Heights (part; also 2nd), Moline Acres, Normandy, Northwoods, Norwood Court, Old Jamestown, Olivette, Overland, Pagedale, Pasadena Hills, Pasadena Park, Pine Lawn, Richmond Heights (part; also 2nd), Riverview, Rock Hill, St. Ann, St. John, Spanish Lake, University City, Uplands Park, Velda City, Velda Village Hills, Vinita Park, Webster Groves (part; also 2nd), Wellston, Woodson Terrace

== List of members representing the district ==
Member	Party	Years	Cong ress	Electoral history	District location
District created March 4, 1847
James B. Bowlin (St. Louis)	Democratic	March 4, 1847 – March 3, 1851	30th 31st	Redistricted from the at-large district and re-elected in 1846. Re-elected in 1848. Lost re-election.	
John F. Darby (St. Louis)	Whig	March 4, 1851 – March 3, 1853	32nd	Elected in 1850. Retired.	
Thomas Hart Benton (St. Louis)	Democratic	March 4, 1853 – March 3, 1855	33rd	Elected in 1852. Lost re-election.	
Luther M. Kennett (St. Louis)	Opposition	March 4, 1855 – March 3, 1857	34th	Elected in 1854. Lost re-election.	
Francis P. Blair Jr. (St. Louis)	Republican	March 4, 1857 – March 3, 1859	35th	Elected in 1856. Lost re-election.	
John R. Barret (St. Louis)	Democratic	March 4, 1859 – June 8, 1860	36th	Elected in 1858. Lost election contest in the House.	
Francis P. Blair Jr. (St. Louis)	Republican	June 8, 1860 – June 25, 1860	36th	Seated by the House upon winning contested election. Resigned.	
Vacant		June 25, 1860 – October 3, 1860	36th		
John R. Barret (St. Louis)	Democratic	October 3, 1860 – March 3, 1861	36th	Elected to finish Blair's term. Lost re-election.	
Francis P. Blair Jr. (St. Louis)	Republican	March 4, 1861 – March 4, 1863	37th	Elected in 1860.	
Francis P. Blair Jr. (St. Louis)	Union Emancipation	March 4, 1863– June 10, 1864	38th	Re-elected in 1862. Lost contested election.	
Samuel Knox (St. Louis)	People's Emancipation	June 10, 1864 – March 3, 1865	38th	Won contested election. Lost re-election.	
John Hogan (St. Louis)	Democratic	March 4, 1865 – March 3, 1867	39th	Elected in 1864. Lost re-election.	
William A. Pile (St. Louis)	Republican	March 4, 1867 – March 3, 1869	40th	Elected in 1866. Lost re-election.	
Erastus Wells (St. Louis)	Democratic	March 4, 1869 – March 3, 1873	41st 42nd	Elected in 1868. Re-elected in 1870. Redistricted to the 2nd district.	
Edwin O. Stanard (St. Louis)	Republican	March 4, 1873 – March 3, 1875	43rd	Elected in 1872. Lost re-election.	
Edward C. Kehr (St. Louis)	Democratic	March 4, 1875 – March 3, 1877	44th	Elected in 1874. Lost re-election.	
Anthony F. Ittner (St. Louis)	Republican	March 4, 1877 – March 3, 1879	45th	Elected in 1876. Retired.	
Martin L. Clardy (Farmington)	Democratic	March 3, 1879 – March 3, 1883	46th 47th	Elected in 1878. Re-elected in 1880. Redistricted to the 10th district.	
William H. Hatch (Hannibal)	Democratic	March 4, 1883 – March 3, 1895	48th 49th 50th 51st 52nd 53rd	Redistricted from the 12th district and re-elected in 1882. Re-elected in 1884. Re-elected in 1886. Re-elected in 1888. Re-elected in 1890. Re-elected in 1892. Lost re-election.	
Charles N. Clark (Hannibal)	Republican	March 4, 1895 – March 3, 1897	54th	Elected in 1894. Retired.	
Vacant		March 4, 1897 – June 1, 1897	55th		
James T. Lloyd (Shelbyville)	Democratic	June 1, 1897 – March 3, 1917	55th 56th 57th 58th 59th 60th 61st 62nd 63rd 64th	Elected after the death of member-elect Richard P. Giles. Re-elected in 1898. Re-elected in 1900. Re-elected in 1902. Re-elected in 1904. Re-elected in 1906. Re-elected in 1908. Re-elected in 1910. Re-elected in 1912. Re-elected in 1914. Retired.	
Milton A. Romjue (Macon)	Democratic	March 4, 1917 – March 3, 1921	65th 66th	Elected in 1916. Re-elected in 1918. Lost re-election.	
Frank C. Millspaugh (Canton)	Republican	March 4, 1921 – December 5, 1922	67th	Elected in 1920. Lost re-election and resigned.	
Vacant		December 5, 1922 – March 3, 1923	67th		
Milton A. Romjue (Macon)	Democratic	March 4, 1923 – March 3, 1933	68th 69th 70th 71st 72nd	Elected in 1922. Re-elected in 1924. Re-elected in 1926. Re-elected in 1928. Re-elected in 1930. Redistricted to the at-large district.	
District inactive		March 4, 1933 – January 3, 1935	73rd	All representatives elected at-large on a general ticket	
Milton A. Romjue (Macon)	Democratic	January 3, 1935 – January 3, 1943	74th 75th 76th 77th	Redistricted from the at-large district and re-elected in 1934. Re-elected in 1936. Re-elected in 1938. Re-elected in 1940. Lost re-election.	
Samuel W. Arnold (Kirksville)	Republican	January 3, 1943 – January 3, 1949	78th 79th 80th	Elected in 1942. Re-elected in 1944. Re-elected in 1946. Lost re-election.	
Clare Magee (Unionville)	Democratic	January 3, 1949 – January 3, 1953	81st 82nd	Elected in 1948. Re-elected in 1950. Retired.	
Frank M. Karsten (St. Louis)	Democratic	January 3, 1953 – January 3, 1969	83rd 84th 85th 86th 87th 88th 89th 90th	Redistricted from the 13th district and re-elected in 1952. Re-elected in 1954. Re-elected in 1956. Re-elected in 1958. Re-elected in 1960. Re-elected in 1962. Re-elected in 1964. Re-elected in 1966. Retired.	1953–1963 [data missing]
Frank M. Karsten (St. Louis)	Democratic	January 3, 1953 – January 3, 1969	83rd 84th 85th 86th 87th 88th 89th 90th	Redistricted from the 13th district and re-elected in 1952. Re-elected in 1954. Re-elected in 1956. Re-elected in 1958. Re-elected in 1960. Re-elected in 1962. Re-elected in 1964. Re-elected in 1966. Retired.	1963–1973 [data missing]
Frank M. Karsten (St. Louis)	Democratic	January 3, 1953 – January 3, 1969	83rd 84th 85th 86th 87th 88th 89th 90th	Redistricted from the 13th district and re-elected in 1952. Re-elected in 1954. Re-elected in 1956. Re-elected in 1958. Re-elected in 1960. Re-elected in 1962. Re-elected in 1964. Re-elected in 1966. Retired.	1963–1973 [data missing]
Bill Clay (St. Louis)	Democratic	January 3, 1969 – January 3, 2001	91st 92nd 93rd 94th 95th 96th 97th 98th 99th 100th 101st 102nd 103rd 104th 105th 106th	Elected in 1968. Re-elected in 1970. Re-elected in 1972. Re-elected in 1974. Re-elected in 1976. Re-elected in 1978. Re-elected in 1980. Re-elected in 1982. Re-elected in 1984. Re-elected in 1986. Re-elected in 1988. Re-elected in 1990. Re-elected in 1992. Re-elected in 1994. Re-elected in 1996. Re-elected in 1998. Retired.	1963–1973 [data missing]
Bill Clay (St. Louis)	Democratic	January 3, 1969 – January 3, 2001	91st 92nd 93rd 94th 95th 96th 97th 98th 99th 100th 101st 102nd 103rd 104th 105th 106th	Elected in 1968. Re-elected in 1970. Re-elected in 1972. Re-elected in 1974. Re-elected in 1976. Re-elected in 1978. Re-elected in 1980. Re-elected in 1982. Re-elected in 1984. Re-elected in 1986. Re-elected in 1988. Re-elected in 1990. Re-elected in 1992. Re-elected in 1994. Re-elected in 1996. Re-elected in 1998. Retired.	1973–1983 [data missing]
Bill Clay (St. Louis)	Democratic	January 3, 1969 – January 3, 2001	91st 92nd 93rd 94th 95th 96th 97th 98th 99th 100th 101st 102nd 103rd 104th 105th 106th	Elected in 1968. Re-elected in 1970. Re-elected in 1972. Re-elected in 1974. Re-elected in 1976. Re-elected in 1978. Re-elected in 1980. Re-elected in 1982. Re-elected in 1984. Re-elected in 1986. Re-elected in 1988. Re-elected in 1990. Re-elected in 1992. Re-elected in 1994. Re-elected in 1996. Re-elected in 1998. Retired.	1983–1993 [data missing]
Bill Clay (St. Louis)	Democratic	January 3, 1969 – January 3, 2001	91st 92nd 93rd 94th 95th 96th 97th 98th 99th 100th 101st 102nd 103rd 104th 105th 106th	Elected in 1968. Re-elected in 1970. Re-elected in 1972. Re-elected in 1974. Re-elected in 1976. Re-elected in 1978. Re-elected in 1980. Re-elected in 1982. Re-elected in 1984. Re-elected in 1986. Re-elected in 1988. Re-elected in 1990. Re-elected in 1992. Re-elected in 1994. Re-elected in 1996. Re-elected in 1998. Retired.	1993–2003 [data missing]
Lacy Clay (St. Louis)	Democratic	January 3, 2001 – January 3, 2021	107th 108th 109th 110th 111th 112th 113th 114th 115th 116th	Elected in 2000. Re-elected in 2002. Re-elected in 2004. Re-elected in 2006. Re-elected in 2008. Re-elected in 2010. Re-elected in 2012. Re-elected in 2014. Re-elected in 2016. Re-elected in 2018. Lost renomination.	1993–2003 [data missing]
Lacy Clay (St. Louis)	Democratic	January 3, 2001 – January 3, 2021	107th 108th 109th 110th 111th 112th 113th 114th 115th 116th	Elected in 2000. Re-elected in 2002. Re-elected in 2004. Re-elected in 2006. Re-elected in 2008. Re-elected in 2010. Re-elected in 2012. Re-elected in 2014. Re-elected in 2016. Re-elected in 2018. Lost renomination.	2003–2013
Lacy Clay (St. Louis)	Democratic	January 3, 2001 – January 3, 2021	107th 108th 109th 110th 111th 112th 113th 114th 115th 116th	Elected in 2000. Re-elected in 2002. Re-elected in 2004. Re-elected in 2006. Re-elected in 2008. Re-elected in 2010. Re-elected in 2012. Re-elected in 2014. Re-elected in 2016. Re-elected in 2018. Lost renomination.	2013–2023
Cori Bush (St. Louis)	Democratic	January 3, 2021 – January 3, 2025	117th 118th	Elected in 2020. Re-elected in 2022. Lost renomination.	2013–2023
Cori Bush (St. Louis)	Democratic	January 3, 2021 – January 3, 2025	117th 118th	Elected in 2020. Re-elected in 2022. Lost renomination.	2023–present
Wesley Bell (Clayton)	Democratic	January 3, 2025– present	119th	Elected in 2024. Re-elected in 2026.	2023–present

== Recent election results ==
=== 2012 ===
Missouri's 1st congressional district, 2012
Party	Candidate	Votes	%
Democratic	Lacy Clay (incumbent)	267,927	78.7
Republican	Robyn Hamlyn	60,832	17.9
Libertarian	Robb Cunningham	11,824	3.5
Total votes		340,583	100.0
Democratic hold			

=== 2014 ===
Missouri's 1st congressional district, 2014
Party	Candidate	Votes	%
Democratic	Lacy Clay (incumbent)	119,315	73.0
Republican	Daniel J. Elder	35,273	21.6
Libertarian	Robb E. Cunningham	8,906	5.4
Total votes		163,494	100.0
Democratic hold			

=== 2016 ===
Missouri's 1st congressional district, 2016
Party	Candidate	Votes	%
Democratic	Lacy Clay (incumbent)	236,993	75.5
Republican	Steven Bailey	62,714	20.0
Libertarian	Robb Cunningham	14,317	4.5
Total votes		314,024	100.0
Democratic hold			

=== 2018 ===
Missouri's 1st congressional district, 2018
Party	Candidate	Votes	%
Democratic	Lacy Clay (incumbent)	219,781	80.1
Republican	Robert Vroman	45,867	16.7
Libertarian	Robb Cunningham	8,727	3.2
Total votes		274,375	100.0
Democratic hold			

=== 2020 ===
Missouri's 1st congressional district, 2020
Party	Candidate	Votes	%
Democratic	Cori Bush	249,087	78.8
Republican	Anthony Rogers	59,940	19.0
Libertarian	Alex Furman	6,766	2.1
Independent	Martin Baker (write-in)	378	0.1
Total votes		316,171	100.0
Democratic hold			

=== 2022 ===
Missouri's 1st congressional district, 2022
Party	Candidate	Votes	%
Democratic	Cori Bush (incumbent)	160,999	72.8
Republican	Andrew Jones	53,767	24.3
Libertarian	George A. Zsidisin	6,192	2.8
Write-in			
Total votes		220,958	100.0
Democratic hold			

=== 2024 ===
2024 Missouri's 1st congressional district election
Party	Candidate	Votes	%
Democratic	Wesley Bell	233,312	75.9
Republican	Andrew Jones	56,453	18.4
Libertarian	Rochelle Riggins	10,070	3.3
Green	Don Fitz	5,151	1.7
Better Party	Blake Ashby	2,279	0.7
Total votes		307,265	100.0
Democratic hold			

== See also ==
- Missouri's congressional districts
- List of United States congressional districts
