= Beverly Hills, Missouri =

- City
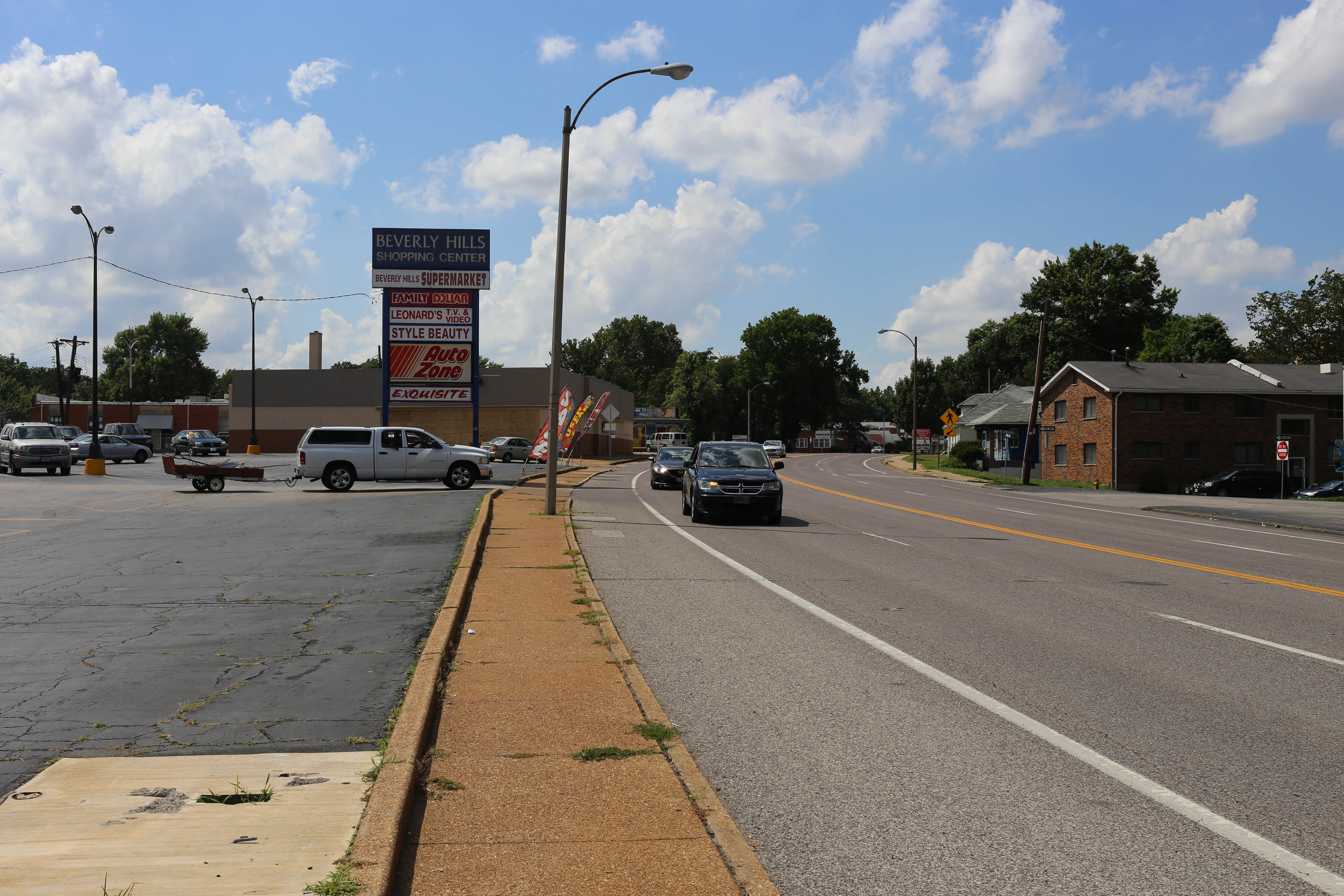
- Street and shopping center, July 2016

- Location of Beverly Hills, Missouri
- Coordinates: 38°41′53″N 90°17′24″W
- Country: United States
- State: Missouri
- County: St. Louis
- Township: Normandy

Area
  - Total: 0.089 sq mi (0.23 km^{2})
  - Land: 0.089 sq mi (0.23 km^{2})
  - Water: 0 sq mi (0.00 km^{2})
- Elevation: 627 ft (191 m)

Population (2020)
  - Total: 475
  - Density: 5,289.3/sq mi (2,042.21/km^{2})
- Time zone: UTC-6 (Central (CST))
  - Summer (DST): UTC-5 (CDT)
- ZIP code: 63121
- Area code: 314
- FIPS code: 29-05248
- GNIS feature ID: 2394159
- Website: citybeverlyhillsstl.com

Beverly Hills is a city in St. Louis County, Missouri, United States. As of the 2020 census, the city population was 475.

== Geography ==
According to the United States Census Bureau, the city has a total area of 0.09 square miles (0.23 km^{2}), all land.

=== Surrounding areas ===
Northwoods
Normandy Northwoods
Glen Echo Park Northwoods
Normandy Uplands Park
Velda City / Velda Village Hills

== Demographics ==
Historical population
Census	Pop.	Note	%±
1940	687		—
1950	938		36.5%
1960	849		−9.5%
1970	846		−0.4%
1980	712		−15.8%
1990	660		−7.3%
2000	603		−8.6%
2010	574		−4.8%
2020	475		−17.2%
U.S. Decennial Census

=== 2020 census ===
Beverly Hills city, Missouri – Racial and ethnic composition Note: the US Census treats Hispanic/Latino as an ethnic category. This table excludes Latinos from the racial categories and assigns them to a separate category. Hispanics/Latinos may be of any race.
Race / Ethnicity (NH = Non-Hispanic)	Pop 2000	Pop 2010	Pop 2020	% 2000	% 2010	% 2020
White alone (NH)	28	24	18	4.64%	4.18%	3.79%
Black or African American alone (NH)	569	530	428	94.36%	92.33%	90.11%
Native American or Alaska Native alone (NH)	2	0	1	0.33%	0.00%	0.21%
Asian alone (NH)	0	1	1	0.00%	0.17%	0.21%
Native Hawaiian or Pacific Islander alone (NH)	0	0	0	0.00%	0.00%	0.00%
Other Race alone (NH)	0	0	0	0.00%	0.00%	0.00%
Mixed race or Multiracial (NH)	3	3	22	0.50%	0.52%	4.63%
Hispanic or Latino (any race)	1	16	5	0.17%	2.79%	1.05%
Total	603	574	475	100.00%	100.00%	100.00%

=== 2010 census ===
As of the census of 2010, there were 574 people, 243 households, and 149 families living in the city. The population density was 6,377.8 inhabitants per square mile (2,462.5/km^{2}). There were 288 housing units at an average density of 3,200.0 per square mile (1,235.5/km^{2}). The racial makeup of the city was 4.2% White, 92.7% African American, 0.2% Asian, 1.4% from other races, and 1.6% from two or more races. Hispanic or Latino of any race were 2.8% of the population.

There were 243 households, of which 28.0% had children under the age of 18 living with them, 19.3% were married couples living together, 35.4% had a female householder with no husband present, 6.6% had a male householder with no wife present, and 38.7% were non-families. 33.7% of all households were made up of individuals, and 11.5% had someone living alone who was 65 years of age or older. The average household size was 2.36 and the average family size was 3.05.

The median age in the city was 40.6 years. 21.8% of residents were under the age of 18; 9.7% were between the ages of 18 and 24; 25.9% were from 25 to 44; 28.6% were from 45 to 64; and 13.9% were 65 years of age or older. The gender makeup of the city was 45.6% male and 54.4% female.

=== 2000 census ===
As of the census of 2000, there were 603 people, 256 households, and 162 families living in the city. The population density was 6,882.0 inhabitants per square mile (2,657.2/km^{2}). There were 291 housing units at an average density of 3,321.2 per square mile (1,282.3/km^{2}). The racial makeup of the city was 4.64% White, 94.53% African American, 0.33% Native American, and 0.50% from two or more races. Hispanic or Latino of any race were 0.17% of the population.

There were 256 households, out of which 25.4% had children under the age of 18 living with them, 26.2% were married couples living together, 30.9% had a female householder with no husband present, and 36.7% were non-families. 34.4% of all households were made up of individuals, and 11.7% had someone living alone who was 65 years of age or older. The average household size was 2.36 and the average family size was 2.99.

In the city, the population was spread out, with 25.4% under the age of 18, 7.3% from 18 to 24, 26.2% from 25 to 44, 26.0% from 45 to 64, and 15.1% who were 65 years of age or older. The median age was 40 years. For every 100 females, there were 76.8 males. For every 100 females age 18 and over, there were 69.8 males.

The median income for a household in the city was $30,060, and the median income for a family was $32,411. Males had a median income of $28,333 versus $26,635 for females. The per capita income for the city was $14,411. About 14.2% of families and 18.0% of the population were below the poverty line, including 23.9% of those under age 18 and 11.1% of those age 65 or over.

== Municipal Court ==
For the fiscal year ending April 30, 2014, Beverly Hills had General Revenue of $794,975, $402,636 or 51% of which came from fines and fees collected by its Municipal Court. Using its population of 574 people from the 2010 Census, the Municipal Court collected $701.45 per person.

In May 2015, press reports indicated that the town makes arrests for minor offenses at twice the national average.

== Education ==
It is in the Normandy Schools Collaborative school district. The comprehensive high school of the district is Normandy High School.
