= Laurence Maroney =

American football player (born 1985)

No. 39, 26
- Position: Running back

Personal information
- Born: February 5, 1985 (age 41); St. Louis, Missouri, U.S.
- Listed height: 5 ft 11 in (1.80 m)
- Listed weight: 220 lb (100 kg)

Career information
- High school: Normandy (Wellston, Missouri)
- College: Minnesota (2003–2005)
- NFL draft: 2006: 1st round, 21st overall pick

Career history
- New England Patriots (2006–2010); Denver Broncos (2010)

Awards and highlights
- Second-team All-American (2005); Big Ten Co-Freshman of the Year (2003); 2× First-team All-Big Ten (2004, 2005)

Career NFL statistics
- Rushing yards: 2,504
- Rushing average: 4.1
- Rushing touchdowns: 21
- Receptions: 44
- Receiving yards: 459
- Receiving touchdowns: 1
- Stats at Pro Football Reference

Laurence Maroney (born February 5, 1985) is an American former professional football player who was a running back for five seasons in the National Football League (NFL). He played college football for the Minnesota Golden Gophers and was selected by the New England Patriots with the 21st overall pick in the 2006 NFL draft. He also played a season for the Denver Broncos.

== Early life ==
Maroney attended Normandy Senior High School in Wellston, Missouri, where he gained four varsity letters in football, three in track, two in basketball, and one in baseball. In basketball, he was twice named team MVP; in track, he placed fifth at the state meet in the 200-meter dash, and third in the 100-meter dash as a senior. Maroney holds Normandy High School's single season rushing record, with 1,903 yards in 2002.

== College career ==
At the University of Minnesota, he split duties with Marion Barber III in 2003 and 2004 and then with Gary Russell in 2005. As such, he started only 14 of 36 games, but still became the first Golden Gopher and the third in Big Ten Conference history to rush for 1,000 yards in each of his first three seasons. He gained a total of 3,933 yards with the Golden Gophers and was a two time All-Big Ten First-team selection (2004–2005). He was also selected an All-American by Pro Football Weekly and Rivals.com in 2005.

== Professional career ==
Pre-draft measurables
Height	Weight	Arm length	Hand span	40-yard dash	10-yard split	20-yard split	Vertical jump	Broad jump	Bench press
5 ft 11 7/8 in (1.83 m)	217 lb (98 kg)	31 3/4 in (0.81 m)	9 7/8 in (0.25 m)	4.48 s	1.57 s	2.61 s	36 in (0.91 m)	10 ft 3 in (3.12 m)	21 reps
All values from NFL Combine/Minnesota Pro Day

=== New England Patriots ===
==== 2006 season ====
Maroney declared for the 2006 NFL draft after the completion of his junior season and was selected in the first round with the 21st overall pick by the New England Patriots. He was the second running back selected behind Reggie Bush. He split time during the 2006 season with Corey Dillon.

Despite missing the team's preseason finale with a knee injury, Maroney played in the team's regular season opener and rushed for 86 yards in his Patriots debut. In Week 4, Maroney ran for 125 yards and two touchdowns (of 11 and 25 yards) on 15 carries against the Cincinnati Bengals, a performance that earned him both FedEx Ground NFL Player of the Week and Diet Pepsi Rookie NFL Player of the Week honors. In Week 7 against the Buffalo Bills, he was voted AFC Special Teams Player of the Week after a 74-yard kickoff return, while in Week 8 he had a 77-yard kickoff return against the Minnesota Vikings. These two were the two longest non-touchdown returns of the season outside of Antonio Cromartie's 91-yard kickoff return against the Oakland Raiders, and they gave Maroney the longest kickoff return average among all NFL players; he finished the 2006 season with 783 kick return yards.

In Week 11, Maroney had 82 yards rushing, and four receptions for 34 yards, including a 19-yard reception that became his first receiving touchdown. However, two weeks later, Maroney suffered torn rib cartilage against the Detroit Lions on December 3 and missed the Patriots' next two games.

==== 2007–2009 ====
Maroney, who became the Patriots' starting running back following the release of Dillon in the offseason, missed three games in October with a groin injury, and rushed for 835 yards in the Patriots' undefeated 2007 regular season. In the playoffs, Maroney became a bigger factor for the Patriots, compiling 244 rushing yards and two touchdowns in two games before playing in Super Bowl XLII. In that game, Maroney had 14 carries for 36 yards with a one-yard touchdown in a loss against the New York Giants.

On October 20, 2008, Maroney's season ended when he was placed on injured reserve due to a shoulder injury, later disclosed by Maroney to be a broken bone suffered in a game against the New York Jets on September 14. He would miss two of the Patriots' next three games and finished the season with 93 rushing yards.

Maroney played in 15 games in 2009, starting five. He finished the season with 757 rushing yards and nine touchdowns and averaged 3.9 yards per carry.

=== Denver Broncos ===
After he was inactive for the Patriots' 2010 season opener against the Cincinnati Bengals, Maroney was traded to the Denver Broncos on September 14, 2010. The Patriots received a 2011 fourth-round selection in return, while the Broncos received a 2011 sixth-round pick from the Patriots. On January 18, 2011, Maroney was arrested on weapons charges in St. Louis, however, he was released without charge, as he had a permit to carry a concealed weapon. On April 3, 2011, Maroney was not re-signed by the Broncos.

== Post-football career ==
After his NFL stint ended in 2010, Laurence Maroney faced significant struggles, including financial hardship and a 2011 arrest on weapons and drug charges (from which he was later acquitted). He has since rebuilt his life, founding the LM39 Foundation to support mental health and financial literacy for athletes.

== Personal life ==
Maroney and his fiancée, Briante Wells, have three children.

== NFL career statistics ==
Legend
**Bold**	Career high

=== Regular season ===
Year	Team	Games		Rushing					Receiving				
Year	Team	GP	GS	Att	Yds	Avg	Lng	TD	Rec	Yds	Avg	Lng	TD
2006	NE	14	0	175	745	4.3	41	6	**22**	**194**	8.8	31	**1**
2007	NE	13	**6**	185	**835**	**4.5**	**59**	6	4	116	**29.0**	**43**	0
2008	NE	3	3	28	93	3.3	17	0	0	0	0.0	0	0
2009	NE	**15**	5	**194**	757	3.9	45	**9**	14	99	7.1	17	0
2010	DEN	4	3	36	74	2.1	13	0	4	50	12.5	28	0
Career		49	17	618	2,504	4.1	59	21	44	459	10.4	43	1

=== Playoffs ===
Year	Team	Games		Rushing					Receiving				
Year	Team	GP	GS	Att	Yds	Avg	Lng	TD	Rec	Yds	Avg	Lng	TD
2006	NE	**3**	0	31	87	2.8	9	0	1	6	6.0	6	0
2007	NE	**3**	**1**	**61**	**280**	**4.6**	**29**	**3**	**5**	**61**	**12.2**	**33**	0
2009	NE	1	**1**	1	2	2.0	2	0	0	0	0.0	0	0
Career		7	2	93	369	4.0	29	3	6	67	11.2	33	0
