= Vinita Terrace, Missouri =

- Former Village
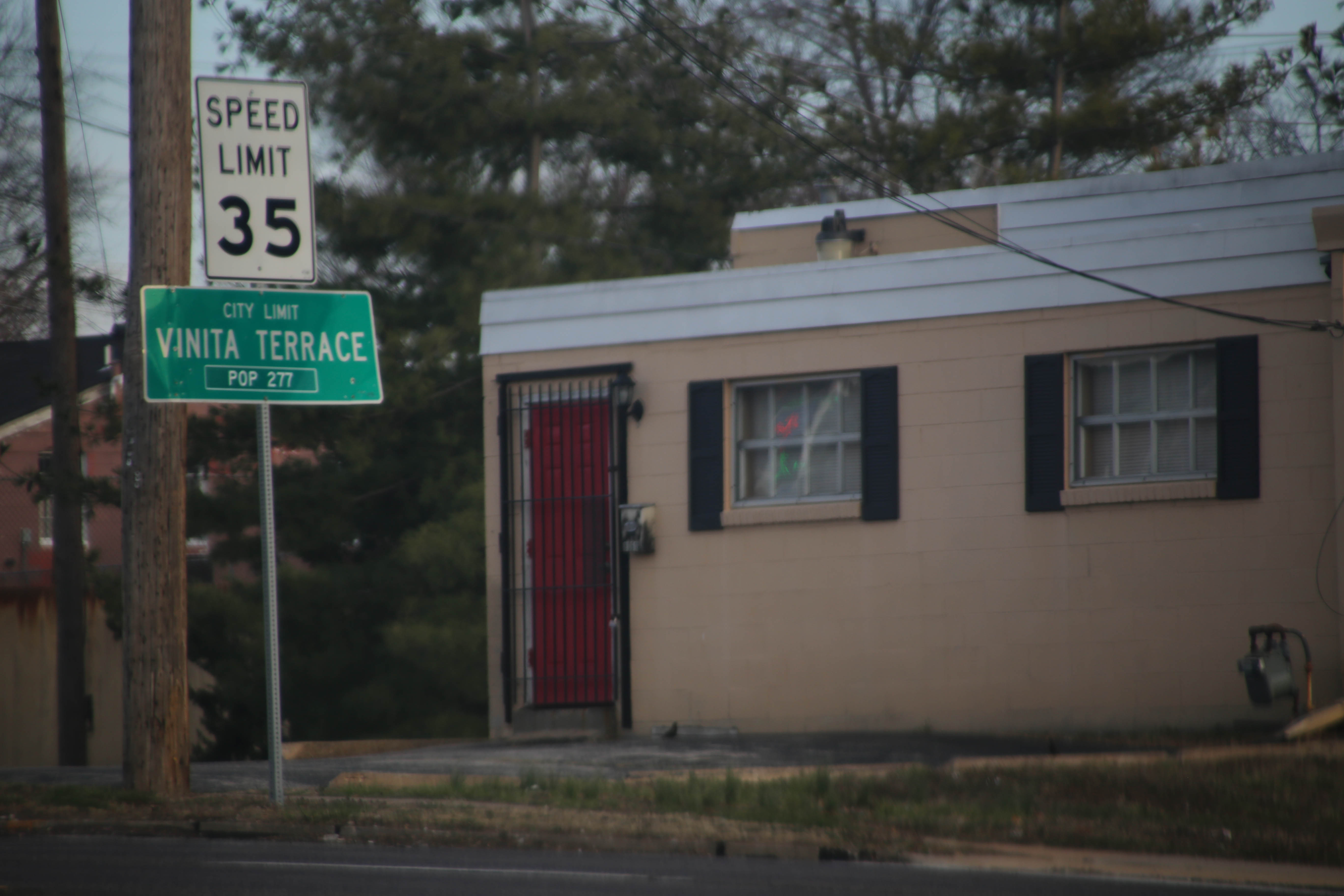
- Vinita Terrace sign, March 2014

- Location of Vinita Terrace, Missouri
- Coordinates: 38°41′6″N 90°19′47″W
- Country: United States
- State: Missouri
- County: St. Louis

Area
  - Total: 0.062 sq mi (0.16 km^{2})
  - Land: 0.062 sq mi (0.16 km^{2})
  - Water: 0 sq mi (0 km^{2})
- Elevation: 614 ft (187 m)

Population (2010)
  - Total: 277
  - Estimate (2016): 276
  - Density: 4,500/sq mi (1,700/km^{2})
- Time zone: UTC-6 (Central (CST))
  - Summer (DST): UTC-5 (CDT)
- FIPS code: 29-76264
- GNIS feature ID: 0756855

Vinita Terrace was a village in St. Louis County, Missouri, United States. The population was 277 at the 2010 census.

Voters of both Vinita Park and neighboring Vinita Terrace voted on November 8, 2016, to consolidate into one municipality to be called the City of Vinita Park. The merger took effect May 10, 2017.

== Geography ==
According to the United States Census Bureau, the village has a total area of 0.06 square miles (0.16 km^{2}), all land.

== Municipal Court Revenue ==
In the fiscal year ending February 28, 2014, Vinita Terrace had general revenue in the amount of $211,150, of which $116,190, or 55%, came from fines and fees collected by its municipal court. Based on its population of 277 from the 2010 census, it collected $419.45 per person.

== Demographics ==
Historical population
Census	Pop.	Note	%±
1950	389		—
1960	382		−1.8%
1970	344		−9.9%
1980	349		1.5%
1990	338		−3.2%
2000	292		−13.6%
2010	277		−5.1%
2016 (est.)	276		−0.4%
U.S. Decennial Census

Vinita Terrace merged into the city of Vinita Park in 2017.

=== 2010 census ===
Vinita Terrace, Missouri – Racial and ethnic composition Note: the US Census treats Hispanic/Latino as an ethnic category. This table excludes Latinos from the racial categories and assigns them to a separate category. Hispanics/Latinos may be of any race.
Race / Ethnicity (NH = Non-Hispanic)	Pop 2000	Pop 2010	% 2000	% 2010
White alone (NH)	75	60	21.66%	21.66%
Black or African American alone (NH)	215	202	73.63%	72.92%
Native American or Alaska Native alone (NH)	0	0	0.00%	0.00%
Asian alone (NH)	1	1	0.34%	0.36%
Native Hawaiian or Pacific Islander alone (NH)	0	0	0.00%	0.00%
Other race alone (NH)	0	1	0.00%	0.36%
Mixed race or Multiracial (NH)	1	10	0.34%	3.61%
Hispanic or Latino (any race)	0	3	0.00%	1.08%
Total	292	277	100.00%	100.00%

As of the census of 2010, there were 277 people, 108 households, and 73 families living in the village. The population density was 4,616.7 inhabitants per square mile (1,782.5/km^{2}). There were 116 housing units at an average density of 1,933.3 per square mile (746.5/km^{2}). The racial makeup of the village was 22.7% White, 72.9% African American, 0.4% Asian, 0.4% from other races, and 3.6% from two or more races. Hispanic or Latino of any race were 1.1% of the population.

There were 108 households, of which 32.4% had children under the age of 18 living with them, 40.7% were married couples living together, 23.1% had a female householder with no husband present, 3.7% had a male householder with no wife present, and 32.4% were non-families. 26.9% of all households were made up of individuals, and 7.5% had someone living alone who was 65 years of age or older. The average household size was 2.56 and the average family size was 3.07.

The median age in the village was 39.3 years. 22.4% of residents were under the age of 18; 7.9% were between the ages of 18 and 24; 26.3% were from 25 to 44; 32.1% were from 45 to 64; and 11.2% were 65 years of age or older. The gender makeup of the village was 45.1% male and 54.9% female.

=== 2000 census ===
As of the census of 2000, there were 292 people, 117 households, and 85 families living in the village. The population density was 4,722.9 inhabitants per square mile (1,823.5/km^{2}). There were 124 housing units at an average density of 2,005.6 per square mile (774.4/km^{2}). The racial makeup of the village was 25.68% White, 73.63% African American, 0.34% Asian, and 0.34% from two or more races.

There were 117 households, out of which 29.1% had children under the age of 18 living with them, 47.9% were married couples living together, 21.4% had a female householder with no husband present, and 26.5% were non-families. 23.1% of all households were made up of individuals, and 6.0% had someone living alone who was 65 years of age or older. The average household size was 2.50 and the average family size was 2.93.

In the village, the population was spread out, with 22.9% under the age of 18, 7.5% from 18 to 24, 26.0% from 25 to 44, 30.5% from 45 to 64, and 13.0% who were 65 years of age or older. The median age was 42 years. For every 100 females, there were 90.8 males. For every 100 females age 18 and over, there were 82.9 males.

The median income for a household in the village was $46,250, and the median income for a family was $56,250. Males had a median income of $47,500 versus $28,125 for females. The per capita income for the village was $23,752. About 5.0% of families and 7.9% of the population were below the poverty line, including 12.7% of those under the age of eighteen and 15.9% of those 65 or over.

== Education ==
The former municipality is and was in the Normandy School District (now Normandy Schools Collaborative). Normandy High School is the comprehensive high school of that district.
