= Wellston School District =

School district in Missouri

Wellston School District was a school district in the inner-ring suburb of Wellston, Missouri. It was home to four schools. The district had 633 students total.

The school district included the majority of Wellston and a portion of Hillsdale.

== History ==
It experienced prosperity until people moved away around the 1960s. The district student body had fewer White American students, and by 2010 was African-American.

It had been accredited by the State of Missouri until 2003, when that status was removed. Since then, according to the Missouri Department of Elementary and Secondary Education, the district, in the words of the Columbia Daily Tribune, "posted little academic improvement".

The district was closed at the end of the 2009-10 school year and merged into the Normandy School District by order of the Missouri State Board of Education. The Normandy district took over the Wellston facilities.

== Schools ==
- Eskridge High School was the only high school in the Wellston School District. It had 166 students and serves grades 9-12.
- Bishop Middle School was the only middle school in the Wellston School District. It served grades 6-8.
- Central Elementary School was Wellston School District's only elementary school. It served grades 1-5.
- Wellston Early Childhood Center served all of the kindergarteners.
