= Normandy Schools Collaborative =

School district in Missouri, United States

Location
- 3855 Lucas and Hunt Road; St. Louis postal address, Missouri United States

District information
- Superintendent: Dr. Michael Triplett
- NCES District ID: 2922650

Students and staff
- Students: 3,300 (As of May 2018)
- Teachers: 241 (As of 2012)
- Staff: 293 (As of 2012)

Other information
- Website: www.normandysc.org

Normandy Schools Collaborative (formerly the Normandy School District) is a public school district serving 23 municipalities in northern St. Louis County, Missouri. The district operates one comprehensive high school which includes an alternative education program, five grade 1-8 elementary schools, and one early learning center (for pre-school, pre-kindergarten, and kindergarten students). The district is named for Normandy, Missouri, one of the primary municipalities served by the district. The Missouri Board of Education voted to end the school district on June 30, 2014. It lost state accreditation that year for poor academic performance (In 2018 the district would gain back its accreditation.)An appointed board replaced the elected board, and the district became a new entity called the “Normandy Schools Collaborative.” The state had direct oversight of the schools. The District was featured on an episode of NPR's This American Life that aired on July 31, 2015.

== History ==
The first recorded account of the schools in Normandy is found in the minutes of the Board of Directors of Schools dated July 12, 1894. It was then a three-director rural district with three public schools already in operation. It was known as District No. 2, Township 46, Range 6 East, Eden, St. Louis County, Missouri. The first school built was Washington School, constructed in 1894 on one acre in the northeast corner of what is now Valhalla Cemetery. Since that first school, the district grew to nine schools which included Normandy High School, Normandy Junior High/Middle (and later 7th-8th Grade Center), in addition to the elementary schools. The district would later add an Early Childhood Center to its offerings.

Normandy Schools (1894–present) Washington School - 1894

- Washington School - 1930

Roosevelt School - 1897-1938 Lincoln School - est. 1900 Garfield School - 1906 McKinley School - 1907 Harrison School - 1907

- Bel-Nor School - 1926
- Jefferson School - 1929

Bel-Ridge School - 1953 Pine Lawn School - 1971 Normandy Junior High School - 1949 Washington High School - 1907

- Normandy High School - 1925
- Lucas Crossing School Complex - 2004
- Barack Obama School - 2010
- Normandy Early Learning Center - 2019
- Currently operating as schools.

Normandy School District maintained a stellar reputation throughout most of the 20th century, but was negatively affected in the 1970s and 1980s when, as was the case in many major cities in the midwest, factories began to close and residents were unable to maintain their working/middle-class salaries. The area was also impacted by white flight, when many of the Caucasian residents fled the inner-ring suburban area for locales further west and south. The reduction of industry, businesses and homeowners took a toll on the district and the surrounding municipalities. The changes in the demographics and economy also had a negative effect on the finances.

In 2010, Normandy School District absorbed the failed Wellston School District under orders of the Missouri Board of Education. Prior to its absorption by the Normandy School District, the Wellston district had about 600 students, one high school, one middle school, and one elementary school. All three schools closed at the end of the 2009–2010 school year.

In September 2012, the Missouri Board of Education voted to remove accreditation from Normandy School District due to ongoing academic issues. Superintendent Stanton Lawrence was angered by the decision, given the district's willingness to absorb Wellston School District in 2010. Lawrence announced his resignation shortly after the state decision. On March 7, 2013, the Normandy School Board selected Tyrone McNichols, an administrator in the Hazelwood School District, as its new superintendent of schools.

In May 2013, discipline incident rates at Normandy High School were the second-highest among all schools in the state and the highest in Greater St. Louis.

The Normandy School Board voted on October 24, 2013 to close Bel-Nor Elementary School and lay off more than 100 teachers in response to the district's ongoing financial problems, a move that would save the district about $3 million. The Board also voted to stop paying tuition and transportation costs for students who transferred from the district (about $1.3 million to 14 districts in Greater St. Louis). Several Missouri legislators, including those who represent districts that include school districts that received students from Normandy, began pressuring the Missouri Board of Education to take over the Normandy School District. On October 26, 2013, Missouri Education Commissioner Chris Nicastro noted that the State Board of Education is examining the possibility of removing the local Normandy School Board from power, which it did on May 20, 2014, after over $8 million in transportation and tuition expenses for children in 20 other school districts left the District almost insolvent. The District sued Missouri the next day, charging there was as much as $10,000 per child spent over the actual cost of the transfer, which has been for approximately 1,000 students.

=== Educational and financial crisis ===
At the beginning of the 2013–2014 school year, Normandy School District had 4,590 students. 97% of Normandy students are black, 1.4% are white, and 1.1% are Hispanic. 91.7% of students receive free or reduced price lunches. The district did not make adequate yearly progress toward state goals in communication arts, mathematics, graduation rate, or attendance rate for 2011.

The August 2014 performance report from Missouri Department of Elementary and Secondary Education lists Normandy School District as the worst-performing district in the state. The district earned only seven of the 50 points possible on the assessment, an almost 4% drop from the previous year.

In 2014 the NSD had five million dollars in debts, and paid lobbyist Andy Blunt $135,000 to seek bailout funds from the state legislature of Missouri.

== Boundary ==
The district, entirely in St. Louis County, includes most of Normandy and almost all of Wellston, as well as all of Bel-Nor, Bel-Ridge, Bellerive Acres, Beverly Hills, Glen Echo Park, Greendale, Hanley Hills, Hillsdale, Northwoods, Norwood Court, Pagedale, Pasadena Hills, Pasadena Park, Pine Lawn, Uplands Park, Velda City, and Velda Village Hills. It also includes a portion of Vinita Park and small portions of Charlack, Cool Valley, Jennings and St. John.

The district includes the former territory of Vinita Terrace.

== Schools ==
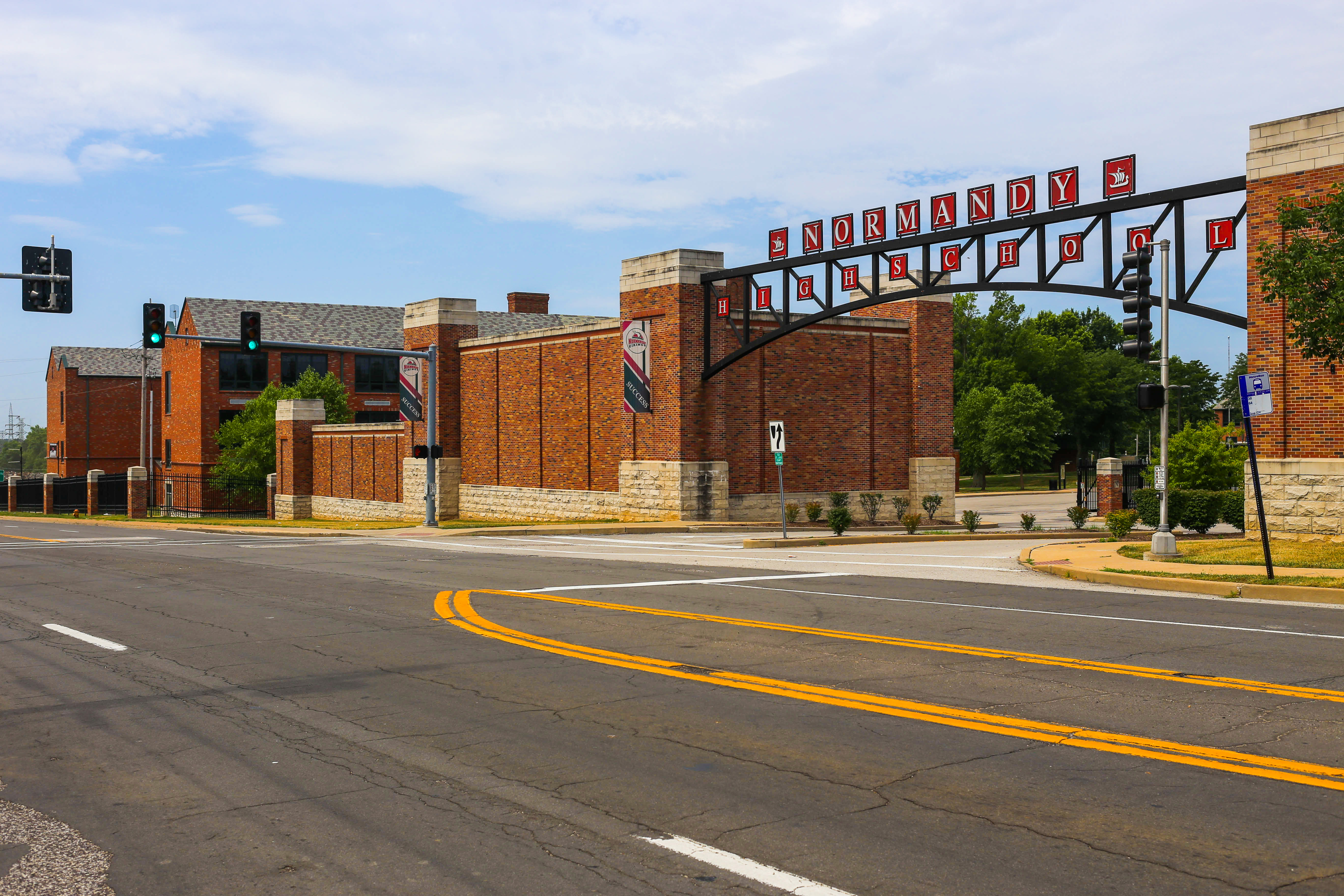
Normandy High School

As of the 2025-2026 school year, the Normandy School District operated one high school, Normandy High School. The district also operated several other schools, including:

Middle school:

- Normandy Middle School at Lucas Crossing

Elementary schools:

- Bel-Nor School
  - At one time it closed in 2014. In 2015 the district planned to repurpose the building as a school for kindergarten students. It is an active school again.
- Jefferson School - Pasadena Hills
- Barack Obama School
  - Barack Obama School is in Pine Lawn. It is a consolidation of Garfield Elementary School and Pine Lawn Elementary School. In 2010 all of the members of the board of trustees voted to name the school after then-President of the United States Barack Obama. Cozy Marks, the president of the board of trustees, believed that African-American children would identify with what Obama did. Students at Garfield and Pine Lawn schools selected Obama's name in a poll for the name of the consolidated school. The area of the building is 65,000 square feet (6,000 m^{2}). The school began operations in 2011.
- Washington School - Vinita Park - It began operations in 1930.

Other schools:

- Normandy Early Learning Center

Alternative:

- Normandy Alternative Learning Center (CASA)

=== Former schools ===
- Bel-Ridge Elementary School was in Bel-Ridge. It closed in 2011.
- Garfield Elementary School - Consolidated into Obama Elementary.
- Harrison Elementary School had a Vinita Park postal address though it was not in the city limits. Lucas Crossing Elementary School, scheduled to open in 2001, took students formerly at Harrison Elementary.
- Lincoln Elementary School was in Pagedale. Lucas Crossing Elementary School, scheduled to open in 2001, took students formerly at Lincoln Elementary.
- Lucas Crossing Elementary School, scheduled to open in 2001, took students formerly at Harrison, Lincoln, and McKinley elementaries.
- Normandy Early Childhood Center was in Pasadena Park.
- The Normandy Kindergarten Center had a Bel-Nor postal address but was in Bel-Ridge.
- McKinley Elementary School, of the Normandy district, had a Hillsdale postal address but was in Velda City. Lucas Crossing Elementary School, scheduled to open in 2001, took students formerly at McKinley Elementary.
- Pine Lawn Elementary School - Consolidated into Obama Elementary.

From the former Wellston school district, the Normandy district took possession of Bishop Middle School, and Eskridge High School.

== A New Start ==
In 2014, the Missouri Department of Elementary and Secondary Education declared the Normandy School District as unaccredited and re-established the district as the Normandy Schools Collaborative. The new entity struggled financially and academically those first few years. However, the new district began to make gains on the Missouri Annual Performance Report.
