= Carsonville, Missouri =

Unincorporated place in Missouri, U.S.

Coordinates: 38°43′01″N 90°19′08″W

Carsonville is an unincorporated place in St. Louis County, Missouri, United States.

== Geography ==
Carsonville is located between Interstate 70 and Route 115 at the southeast edge of Berkeley. It is surrounded by Berkeley to the north, Bel-Ridge on the west and south, and Bellerive on the east. The community was named after the Carson family, who had a store and blacksmith shop nearby.

Much of the original housing in Carsonville remains. The community was notable because the West End Narrow Gauge Railway from St. Louis to Florissant passed through it, coming up the north side of Natural Bridge Road, then making a wide swing across Carson Road, which is now Hanley Road, to head for Lake Ramona in what is now Berkeley. The railroad passed on the west edge of Thies Farm, which is still in operation. The line became the Florissant and City Limits-Ferguson streetcar lines and the portion of right-of-way in Carsonville, and an electric substation, still are visible. On Cranberry Lane to the west of Hanley, the right-of-way is in place, complete with electric poles and the concrete posts which lined the railroad right-of-way remain visible. Hanley Road north of Lake Ramona was the streetcar right-of-way all the way to Airport Road and several blocks beyond to the Wabash railroad. The junction with the Ferguson line at Suburban Avenue is no longer visible, but the electric substation there is still standing on the east side of Hanley, right up against the road. That substation was the subject of considerable coverage in the electric railway press when it was built.
