= Normandy High School (Missouri) =

Public secondary school in Missouri, US

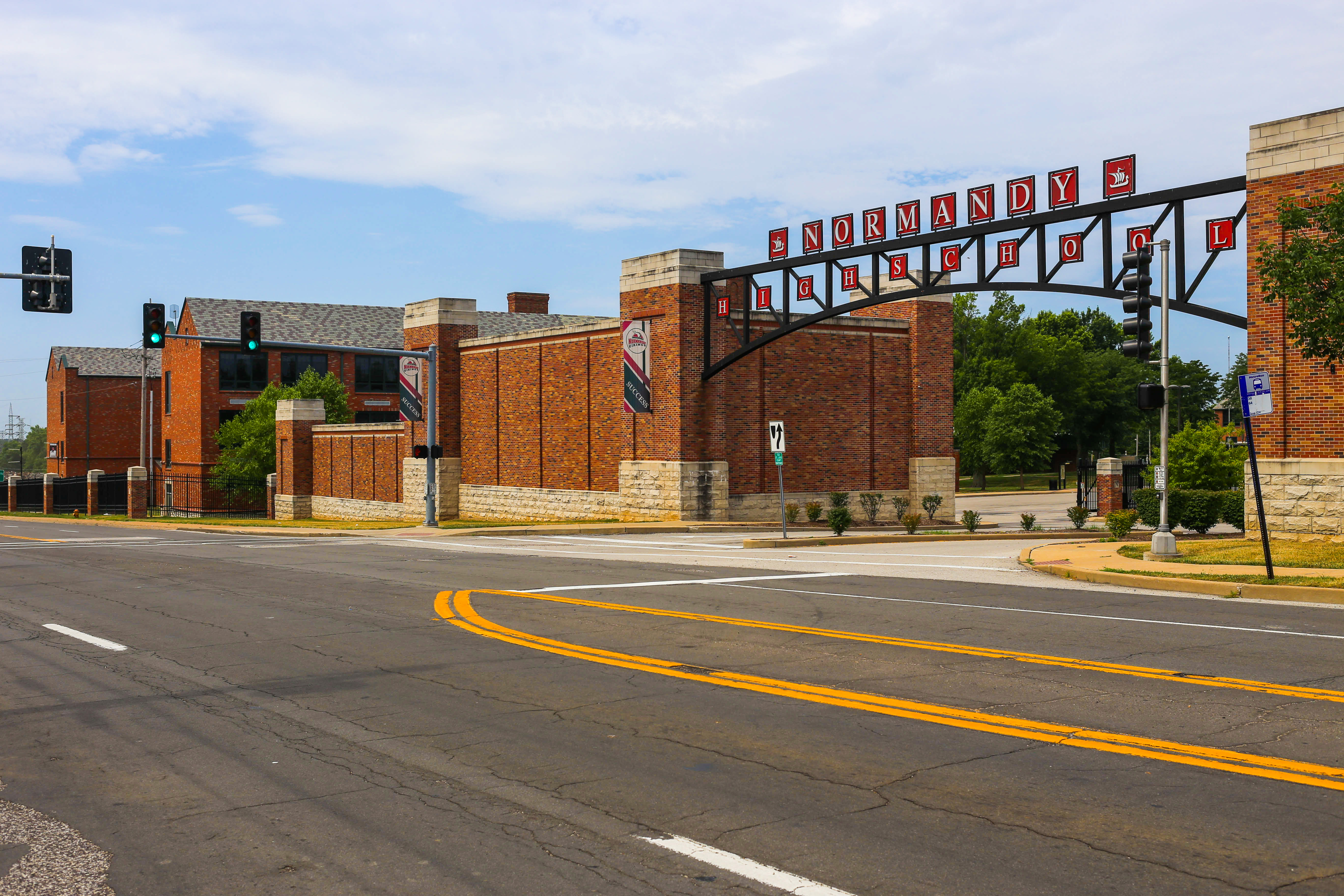
- Normandy High School, June 2016

Location
- 6701 Saint Charles Rock Road; Wellston, Missouri 63133; United States; 38°40′57″N 90°17′48″W

Information
- Type: Public high school
- Established: 1923; 103 years ago
- School district: Normandy Schools Collaborative
- Principal: Derrick Mitchell
- Teaching staff: 42.00 (on an FTE basis)
- Grades: 9–12
- Enrollment: 747 (2023–24)
- Student to teacher ratio: 17.79
- Colors: Red and green
- Athletics conference: Suburban Conference
- Nickname: Vikings
- Website: normandyhighschool.normandysc.org

Normandy High School is a public high school located in Wellston, St. Louis County, Missouri that is part of the Normandy Schools Collaborative.

== History ==
Normandy started a high school at Lincoln Elementary School in Pagedale early its history but it did not last beyond a year. In 1907 a high school was started in the former Washington Elementary School on St. Charles Rock Road, but only one class graduated when the school closed in 1911. In 1923, the district again opened a school, this time on property purchased from the Eden Theological Seminary. For its first year, the high school shared the ornate four-story main building with Eden students. Plans by William B. Ittner for a California-style collegiate campus with a central quadrangle were implemented shortly after. The school opened as a combined junior high school and senior high school, with six levels from 7th through 12th grades. Plans also called for adding the first two years of college. This plan was realized in a way forty years later with the opening of the Normandy Residence Center, which became the University of Missouri-St. Louis. A vocational building and gymnasium, also designed by Ittner, were added in 1929. The vocational building remains as West Hall. The gymnasium, with curved, amphitheater-style seating, was renowned in the area for its architecture.

The founders of the high school had the goal of creating the "ideal high school". The founders embraced an educational concept called "functional education," which meant educating young people to assume their place in the democracy as intelligent, educated, civically involved, ethical people. The curriculum was based on life skills; for example, gaining a lifetime liking for reading, a lifetime passion for learning. Classroom teaching was largely modeled on John Dewey's beliefs in learning by doing and relating the school to the community outside the school and, furthermore, making the school the center of the community. Lectures and tests based on student feeding the lectures back to the teacher were bypassed for hands-on projects, panel discussions, research projects and experiences outside the school. Normandy High was a so-called "lighthouse" school, with its programs the subject of numerous articles in The School Review and other educators' publications and of panels at high-profile places such as the University of Chicago.

Several changes to the original layout of the school were made during the 1940s and 1950s. The Garage, erected in the 1940s with a bus garage below and classrooms above, remains as North Hall. The school opened one of the first St. Louis County high school pools in 1948. Due to large enrollment, a separate junior high school was planned and built in 1949; however, a fire damaged the original junior high school building that year, and while construction was ongoing on the new building, classes were held in two sessions a day. Prior to the 1950s, the campus also included a large lake and forest area, and the school retained faculty residences inherited from Eden in which the Normandy School District superintendent and some teachers lived. The original seminary building was replaced by Central Hall in 1959; the large, Ittner-designed gymnasium was demolished and replaced by the circular Viking Hall.

== Attendance boundary ==
The district, entirely in St. Louis County, includes most of Normandy and almost all of Wellston, as well as all of Bel-Nor, Bel-Ridge, Bellerive Acres, Beverly Hills, Glen Echo Park, Greendale, Hanley Hills, Hillsdale, Northwoods, Norwood Court, Pagedale, Pasadena Hills, Pasadena Park, Pine Lawn, Uplands Park, Velda City, Velda Village Hills. It also includes a portion of Vinita Park and small portions of Charlack, Cool Valley, Jennings and St. John.

The district includes the former territory of Vinita Terrace.

== Activities ==
For the 2013–2014 school year, the school offered 17 activities approved by the Missouri State High School Activities Association (MSHSAA): baseball, boys and girls basketball, sideline cheerleading, boys and girls cross country, dance team, 11-man football, music activities, girls soccer, softball, speech and debate, girls swimming and diving, boys and girls track and field, girls volleyball, and wrestling. In addition to its current activities, Normandy students have won several state championships, including:

- Baseball: 1953
- Boys basketball: 1951
- Boys golf: 1936, 1949, 1950, 1957
- Boys soccer: 1974
- Boys swimming and diving: 1952, 1954
- Boys track and field: 1974
- Girls track and field: 1986
- Wrestling: 1937, 1938, 1939, 1940

== Notable alumni ==
- Michael Brown, shot by police in 2014, led to Ferguson unrest
- Laurence Maroney, National Football League player
- Tony Pearson, Mr. World and AAU Mr. Universe body building contestant
- Steve Pecher, professional soccer player
- DJ TAB, DJ, music producer
- Robert A. Young, U.S. Representative Missouri
- Sexyy Red, rapper
