= Crystal Lake Park, Missouri =

- City
- Aerial photo of Crystal Lake Park, Missouri. September 2026.

- Logo

- Location of Crystal Lake Park, Missouri
- Coordinates: 38°37′16″N 90°25′55″W
- Country: United States
- State: Missouri
- County: St. Louis
- Township: Missouri River
- Village: 1938
- City: 1957
- Named for: Crystal Lake Country Club (no longer exists)

Government
  - Mayor: Anne Wagner
  - Alderperson: Dan London
  - Alderperson: Nancy Brooks
  - Alderperson: Elizabeth Strevey
  - Alderperson: David Smith

Area
  - Total: 0.097 sq mi (0.25 km^{2})
  - Land: 0.097 sq mi (0.25 km^{2})
  - Water: 0 sq mi (0.00 km^{2})
- Elevation: 584 ft (178 m)

Population (2020)
  - Total: 508
  - Density: 5,231.6/sq mi (2,019.95/km^{2})
- Time zone: UTC-6 (Central (CST))
  - Summer (DST): UTC-5 (CDT)
- Zip code: 63131
- Area code: 314
- FIPS code: 29-17650
- GNIS feature ID: 2393687
- Website: www.crystallakepark.org

Crystal Lake Park is a Missouri Class 4 city in St. Louis County, Missouri, United States. The population was 508 at the 2020 census.

== Geography ==
According to the United States Census Bureau, the city has a total area of 0.11 square miles (0.28 km^{2}), all land.

== Demographics ==
=== 2020 census ===
Historical population
Census	Pop.	Note	%±
1940	95		—
1950	167		75.8%
1960	307		83.8%
1970	356		16.0%
1980	496		39.3%
1990	506		2.0%
2000	457		−9.7%
2010	470		2.8%
2020	508		8.1%
U.S. Decennial Census

Crystal Lake Park city, Missouri – Racial and ethnic composition Note: the US Census treats Hispanic/Latino as an ethnic category. This table excludes Latinos from the racial categories and assigns them to a separate category. Hispanics/Latinos may be of any race.
Race / Ethnicity (NH = Non-Hispanic)	Pop 2000	Pop 2010	Pop 2020	% 2000	% 2010	% 2020
White alone (NH)	436	424	401	95.40%	90.21%	78.94%
Black or African American alone (NH)	0	13	21	0.00%	2.77%	4.13%
Native American or Alaska Native alone (NH)	1	0	0	0.22%	0.00%	0.00%
Asian alone (NH)	3	22	45	0.66%	4.68%	8.86%
Native Hawaiian or Pacific Islander alone (NH)	1	0	0	0.22%	0.00%	0.00%
Other race alone (NH)	3	0	7	0.66%	0.00%	1.38%
Mixed race or Multiracial (NH)	7	4	16	1.53%	0.85%	3.15%
Hispanic or Latino (any race)	6	7	18	1.31%	1.49%	3.54%
Total	457	470	508	100.00%	100.00%	100.00%

As of the 2020 census there were 508 people and 179 households living in the city. The racial makeup of the city was 79.3% White, 4.1% African American, 8.9% Asian, 1.8% from other races, and 5.5% from two or more races. Hispanic or Latino of any race were 3.5%.

=== 2010 census ===
At the 2010 census there were 470 people, 202 households, and 136 families living in the city. The population density was 4,272.7 inhabitants per square mile (1,649.7/km^{2}). There were 222 housing units at an average density of 2,018.2 per square mile (779.2/km^{2}). The racial makeup of the city was 91.5% White, 2.8% African American, 4.7% Asian, 0.2% from other races, and 0.9% from two or more races. Hispanic or Latino of any race were 1.5%.

Of the 202 households 29.7% had children under the age of 18 living with them, 57.9% were married couples living together, 7.4% had a female householder with no husband present, 2.0% had a male householder with no wife present, and 32.7% were non-families. 29.2% of households were one person and 16.9% were one person aged 65 or older. The average household size was 2.33 and the average family size was 2.91.

The median age was 47.9 years. 25.3% of residents were under the age of 18; 2.4% were between the ages of 18 and 24; 16.8% were from 25 to 44; 34.4% were from 45 to 64; and 21.1% were 65 or older. The gender makeup of the city was 44.9% male and 55.1% female.

=== 2000 census ===
At the 2000 census there were 457 people, 204 households, and 136 families living in the city. The population density was 4,787.5 inhabitants per square mile (1,848.5/km^{2}). There were 221 housing units at an average density of 2,315.2 per square mile (893.9/km^{2}). The racial makeup of the city was 96.72% White, 0.22% Native American, 0.66% Asian, 0.22% Pacific Islander, 0.66% from other races, and 1.53% from two or more races. Hispanic or Latino of any race were 1.31%.

Of the 204 households 28.9% had children under the age of 18 living with them, 58.8% were married couples living together, 5.4% had a female householder with no husband present, and 33.3% were non-families. 30.4% of households were one person and 14.2% were one person aged 65 or older. The average household size was 2.24 and the average family size was 2.80.

The age distribution was 21.7% under the age of 18, 3.5% from 18 to 24, 21.0% from 25 to 44, 30.4% from 45 to 64, and 23.4% 65 or older. The median age was 47 years. For every 100 females, there were 87.3 males. For every 100 females age 18 and over, there were 82.7 males.

The median household income was $78,441 and the median family income was $91,765. Males had a median income of $61,875 versus $44,375 for females. The per capita income for the city was $55,596. About 2.3% of families and 3.1% of the population were below the poverty line, including 3.1% of those under age 18 and 2.6% of those age 65 or over.

== Education ==
It is in the Ladue School District.
