= Winchester, Missouri =

- City
- Location of Winchester, Missouri
- Coordinates: 38°35′23″N 90°31′34″W
- Country: United States
- State: Missouri
- County: St. Louis
- Incorporated (Village): 1935
- Incorporated (City): 1957

Government
  - Mayor: Gail Winham (R)
  - Aldermen: Marie Bach; Sarah Gibbs; Tony DeLuca; Michael Schmidt

Area
  - Total: 0.25 sq mi (0.65 km^{2})
  - Land: 0.25 sq mi (0.65 km^{2})
  - Water: 0 sq mi (0.00 km^{2})
- Elevation: 623 ft (190 m)

Population (2020)
  - Total: 1,447
  - Density: 5,775.1/sq mi (2,229.79/km^{2})
- Time zone: UTC-6 (Central (CST))
  - Summer (DST): UTC-5 (CDT)
- ZIP code: 63021
- Area code: 636
- FIPS code: 29-80314
- GNIS feature ID: 2397337
- Website: www.city.winchester.mo.us

Winchester is a city in St. Louis County, Missouri, United States. The population was 1,447 at the 2020 census.

== Geography ==
According to the United States Census Bureau, the city has a total area of 0.25 square miles (0.65 km^{2}), all land.

== Demographics ==
Historical population
Census	Pop.	Note	%±
1940	108		—
1950	176		63.0%
1960	1,299		638.1%
1970	2,329		79.3%
1980	2,077		−10.8%
1990	1,678		−19.2%
2000	1,651		−1.6%
2010	1,547		−6.3%
2020	1,447		−6.5%
U.S. Decennial Census

=== 2020 census ===
Winchester city, Missouri – Racial and ethnic composition Note: the US Census treats Hispanic/Latino as an ethnic category. This table excludes Latinos from the racial categories and assigns them to a separate category. Hispanics/Latinos may be of any race.
Race / Ethnicity (NH = Non-Hispanic)	Pop 2000	Pop 2010	Pop 2020	% 2000	% 2010	% 2020
White alone (NH)	1,570	1,394	1,142	95.09%	90.11%	78.92%
Black or African American alone (NH)	16	19	51	0.97%	1.23%	3.52%
Native American or Alaska Native alone (NH)	3	4	4	0.18%	0.26%	0.28%
Asian alone (NH)	15	22	37	0.91%	1.42%	2.56%
Native Hawaiian or Pacific Islander alone (NH)	0	2	2	0.00%	0.13%	0.14%
Other race alone (NH)	3	3	4	0.18%	0.19%	0.28%
Mixed race or Multiracial (NH)	13	35	107	0.79%	2.26%	7.39%
Hispanic or Latino (any race)	31	68	100	1.88%	4.40%	6.91%
Total	1,651	1,547	1,447	100.00%	100.00%	100.00%

As of the 2020 census, there were 1,447 people and 546 households living in the city. The racial makeup of the city was 80.6% White (78.9% non-Hispanic White), 3.8% African American, 0.3% Native American, 2.7% Asian, 0.1% Pacific Islander, 2.8% from other races, and 9.7% from two or more races. Hispanic or Latino of any race were 6.9%.

=== 2010 census ===
At the 2010 census there were 1,547 people, 596 households, and 386 families living in the city. The population density was 6,188.0 inhabitants per square mile (2,389.2/km^{2}). There were 608 housing units at an average density of 2,432.0 per square mile (939.0/km^{2}). The racial makeup of the city was 92.6% White, 1.2% African American, 0.5% Native American, 1.4% Asian, 0.1% Pacific Islander, 1.6% from other races, and 2.7% from two or more races. Hispanic or Latino of any race were 4.4%.

Of the 596 households 31.7% had children under the age of 18 living with them, 44.6% were married couples living together, 13.1% had a female householder with no husband present, 7.0% had a male householder with no wife present, and 35.2% were non-families. 29.2% of households were one person and 9.7% were one person aged 65 or older. The average household size was 2.44 and the average family size was 3.02.

The median age was 36.8 years. 22% of residents were under the age of 18; 7.3% were between the ages of 18 and 24; 32.5% were from 25 to 44; 22.1% were from 45 to 64; and 16.2% were 65 or older. The gender makeup of the city was 47.8% male and 52.2% female.

=== 2000 census ===
At the 2000 census there were 1,651 people, 599 households, and 425 families living in the city. The population density was 6,723.0 inhabitants per square mile (2,595.8/km^{2}). There were 607 housing units at an average density of 2,471.7 per square mile (954.3/km^{2}). The racial makeup of the city was 95.88% White, 1.27% African American, 0.36% Native American, 0.97% Asian, 0.36% from other races, and 1.15% from two or more races. Hispanic or Latino of any race were 1.88%.

Of the 599 households 36.7% had children under the age of 18 living with them, 52.4% were married couples living together, 14.4% had a female householder with no husband present, and 29.0% were non-families. 23.4% of households were one person and 8.2% were one person aged 65 or older. The average household size was 2.58 and the average family size was 3.06.

The age distribution was 24.8% under the age of 18, 6.4% from 18 to 24, 34.2% from 25 to 44, 19.3% from 45 to 64, and 15.4% 65 or older. The median age was 36 years. For every 100 females, there were 85.9 males. For every 100 females age 18 and over, there were 80.3 males.

The median household income was $47,829 and the median family income was $51,071. Males had a median income of $35,735 versus $27,500 for females. The per capita income for the city was $18,920. About 4.2% of families and 4.0% of the population were below the poverty line, including 6.2% of those under age 18 and 5.6% of those age 65 or over.

== Education ==
Most of Winchester is in the Parkway School District, while a portion is in Rockwood R-VI School District.
