= Norwood Court, Missouri =

- Village
- Location of Norwood Court, Missouri
- Coordinates: 38°42′51″N 90°17′22″W
- Country: United States
- State: Missouri
- County: St. Louis
- Township: Normandy
- Incorporated: 1949

Area
  - Total: 0.12 sq mi (0.32 km^{2})
  - Land: 0.12 sq mi (0.32 km^{2})
  - Water: 0 sq mi (0.00 km^{2})
- Elevation: 600 ft (180 m)

Population (2020)
  - Total: 890
  - Density: 7,274.0/sq mi (2,808.49/km^{2})
- Time zone: UTC-6 (Central (CST))
  - Summer (DST): UTC-5 (CDT)
- ZIP code: 63121
- Area code: 314/557
- FIPS code: 29-53462
- GNIS feature ID: 2396825
- Website: norwoodct.us

Norwood Court is a village in Normandy Township, St. Louis County, Missouri, United States. The population was 890 at the 2020 census.

== History ==
Norwood Court was incorporated in 1949.

== Geography ==
According to the United States Census Bureau, the village has a total area of 0.13 square miles (0.34 km^{2}), all land.

== Demographics ==
Historical population
Census	Pop.	Note	%±
1950	72		—
1960	186		158.3%
1970	358		92.5%
1980	881		146.1%
1990	888		0.8%
2000	1,061		19.5%
2010	959		−9.6%
2020	890		−7.2%
U.S. Decennial Census

=== 2020 census ===
Norwood Court town, Missouri – Racial and ethnic composition Note: the US Census treats Hispanic/Latino as an ethnic category. This table excludes Latinos from the racial categories and assigns them to a separate category. Hispanics/Latinos may be of any race.
Race / Ethnicity (NH = Non-Hispanic)	Pop 2000	Pop 2010	Pop 2020	% 2000	% 2010	% 2020
White alone (NH)	58	38	26	5.47%	3.96%	2.92%
Black or African American alone (NH)	981	901	829	92.46%	93.95%	93.15%
Native American or Alaska Native alone (NH)	3	0	3	0.28%	0.00%	0.34%
Asian alone (NH)	4	1	2	0.38%	0.10%	0.22%
Native Hawaiian or Pacific Islander alone (NH)	0	0	1	0.00%	0.00%	0.11%
Other race alone (NH)	2	3	0	0.19%	0.31%	0.00%
Mixed race or Multiracial (NH)	8	12	14	0.75%	1.25%	1.57%
Hispanic or Latino (any race)	5	4	15	0.47%	0.42%	1.69%
Total	1,061	959	890	100.00%	100.00%	100.00%

=== 2010 census ===
At the 2010 census there were 959 people, 530 households, and 210 families living in the village. The population density was 7,376.9 inhabitants per square mile (2,848.2/km^{2}). There were 582 housing units at an average density of 4,476.9 per square mile (1,728.5/km^{2}). The racial makeup of the village was 4.1% White, 94.2% African American, 0.1% Native American, 0.1% Asian, 0.3% from other races, and 1.3% from two or more races. Hispanic or Latino of any race were 0.4%.

Of the 530 households 24.5% had children under the age of 18 living with them, 11.9% were married couples living together, 22.5% had a female householder with no husband present, 5.3% had a male householder with no wife present, and 60.4% were non-families. 51.3% of households were one person and 8.1% were one person aged 65 or older. The average household size was 1.81 and the average family size was 2.64.

The median age in the village was 31.5 years. 19.5% of residents were under the age of 18; 18.1% were between the ages of 18 and 24; 29.6% were from 25 to 44; 24.4% were from 45 to 64; and 8.4% were 65 or older. The gender makeup of the village was 39.8% male and 60.2% female.

=== 2000 census ===
At the 2000 census there were 1,061 people, 583 households, and 240 families living in the town. The population density was 7,783.2 inhabitants per square mile (3,005.1/km^{2}). There were 595 housing units at an average density of 4,364.8 per square mile (1,685.3/km^{2}). The racial makeup of the town was 5.47% White, 92.74% African American, 0.28% Native American, 0.38% Asian, 0.28% from other races, and 0.85% from two or more races. Hispanic or Latino of any race were 0.47%.

Of the 583 households 23.8% had children under the age of 18 living with them, 16.1% were married couples living together, 19.4% had a female householder with no husband present, and 58.8% were non-families. 51.3% of households were one person and 7.2% were one person aged 65 or older. The average household size was 1.82 and the average family size was 2.68.

The age distribution was 21.7% under the age of 18, 10.9% from 18 to 24, 41.2% from 25 to 44, 18.2% from 45 to 64, and 8.0% 65 or older. The median age was 31 years. For every 100 females, there were 85.2 males. For every 100 females age 18 and over, there were 83.4 males.

The median household income was $28,375 and the median family income was $28,594. Males had a median income of $29,453 versus $22,955 for females. The per capita income for the town was $19,684. About 13.0% of families and 13.9% of the population were below the poverty line, including 20.9% of those under age 18 and 5.6% of those age 65 or over.

== Education ==
It is in the Normandy Schools Collaborative school district. The comprehensive high school of the district is Normandy High School.
