= Wilbur Park, Missouri =

- Village
- Location of Wilbur Park, Missouri
- Coordinates: 38°33′11″N 90°18′31″W
- Country: United States
- State: Missouri
- County: St. Louis
- Township: Concord

Area
  - Total: 0.058 sq mi (0.15 km^{2})
  - Land: 0.058 sq mi (0.15 km^{2})
  - Water: 0 sq mi (0.00 km^{2})
- Elevation: 509 ft (155 m)

Population (2020)
  - Total: 439
  - Density: 7,386.5/sq mi (2,851.95/km^{2})
- Time zone: UTC-6 (Central (CST))
  - Summer (DST): UTC-5 (CDT)
- ZIP code: 63123
- Area code: 314
- FIPS code: 29-79756
- GNIS feature ID: 2400168

Wilbur Park is a village in Concord Township, St. Louis County, Missouri, United States. The population was 439 at the 2020 census.

== Geography ==
According to the United States Census Bureau, the village has a total area of 0.06 square miles (0.16 km^{2}), all land.

== Demographics ==
Historical population
Census	Pop.	Note	%±
1950	743		—
1960	684		−7.9%
1970	692		1.2%
1980	564		−18.5%
1990	522		−7.4%
2000	475		−9.0%
2010	471		−0.8%
2020	439		−6.8%
U.S. Decennial Census

=== 2020 census ===
Wilbur Park village, Missouri – Racial and ethnic composition Note: the US Census treats Hispanic/Latino as an ethnic category. This table excludes Latinos from the racial categories and assigns them to a separate category. Hispanics/Latinos may be of any race.
Race / Ethnicity (NH = Non-Hispanic)	Pop 2000	Pop 2010	Pop 2020	% 2000	% 2010	% 2020
White alone (NH)	452	451	392	95.16%	95.75%	89.29%
Black or African American alone (NH)	2	1	14	0.42%	0.21%	3.19%
Native American or Alaska Native alone (NH)	3	0	0	0.63%	0.00%	0.00%
Asian alone (NH)	7	9	1	1.47%	1.91%	0.23%
Native Hawaiian or Pacific Islander alone (NH)	0	0	1	0.00%	0.00%	0.23%
Other race alone (NH)	0	0	1	0.00%	0.00%	0.23%
Mixed race or Multiracial (NH)	5	8	17	1.05%	1.70%	3.87%
Hispanic or Latino (any race)	6	2	13	1.26%	0.42%	2.96%
Total	475	471	439	100.00%	100.00%	100.00%

=== 2010 census ===
As of the census of 2010, there were 471 people, 203 households, and 132 families living in the village. The population density was 7,850.0 inhabitants per square mile (3,030.9/km^{2}). There were 212 housing units at an average density of 3,533.3 per square mile (1,364.2/km^{2}). The racial makeup of the village was 96.2% White, 0.2% African American, 1.9% Asian, and 1.7% from two or more races. Hispanic or Latino of any race were 0.4% of the population.

There were 203 households, of which 26.6% had children under the age of 18 living with them, 48.8% were married couples living together, 11.8% had a female householder with no husband present, 4.4% had a male householder with no wife present, and 35.0% were non-families. 29.1% of all households were made up of individuals, and 11.9% had someone living alone who was 65 years of age or older. The average household size was 2.32 and the average family size was 2.86.

The median age in the village was 39.2 years. 16.6% of residents were under the age of 18; 7.4% were between the ages of 18 and 24; 32.5% were from 25 to 44; 28.5% were from 45 to 64; and 15.1% were 65 years of age or older. The gender makeup of the village was 46.7% male and 53.3% female.

=== 2000 census ===
As of the census of 2000, there were 475 people, 207 households, and 140 families living in the village. The population density was 7,882.2 inhabitants per square mile (3,043.3/km^{2}). There were 214 housing units at an average density of 3,551.2 per square mile (1,371.1/km^{2}). The racial makeup of the village was 96.00% White, 0.42% African American, 0.63% Native American, 1.47% Asian, 0.42% from other races, and 1.05% from two or more races. Hispanic or Latino of any race were 1.26% of the population.

There were 207 households, out of which 28.0% had children under the age of 18 living with them, 50.7% were married couples living together, 14.0% had a female householder with no husband present, and 31.9% were non-families. 29.0% of all households were made up of individuals, and 14.0% had someone living alone who was 65 years of age or older. The average household size was 2.29 and the average family size was 2.81.

In the village, the population was spread out, with 20.4% under the age of 18, 5.3% from 18 to 24, 33.7% from 25 to 44, 19.2% from 45 to 64, and 21.5% who were 65 years of age or older. The median age was 39 years. For every 100 females, there were 74.6 males. For every 100 females age 18 and over, there were 75.0 males.

The median income for a household in the village was $44,167, and the median income for a family was $49,583. Males had a median income of $38,750 versus $32,500 for females. The per capita income for the village was $18,263. About 4.2% of families and 4.2% of the population were below the poverty line, including 8.3% of those under age 18 and 7.1% of those age 65 or over.
