= Bellerive Acres, Missouri =

- City
- Location of Bellerive Acres, Missouri
- Coordinates: 38°42′44″N 90°18′44″W
- Country: United States
- State: Missouri
- County: St. Louis
- Township: Normandy

Area
  - Total: 0.34 sq mi (0.88 km^{2})
  - Land: 0.34 sq mi (0.88 km^{2})
  - Water: 0 sq mi (0.00 km^{2})
- Elevation: 568 ft (173 m)

Population (2020)
  - Total: 191
  - Density: 560/sq mi (217/km^{2})
- Time zone: UTC-6 (Central (CST))
  - Summer (DST): UTC-5 (CDT)
- ZIP code: 63121
- Area code: 314
- FIPS code: 29-04240
- GNIS feature ID: 2398078
- Website: new.belleriveacresmo.gov

Bellerive Acres is a northern suburban city in Normandy Township, St. Louis County, Missouri, United States. The population was 191 at the 2020 census. In April, 2015, the residents voted to change the village of Bellerive to a fourth class city named Bellerive Acres.

It is the former site of Bellerive Country Club, which relocated southwest to Town and Country in 1959. Much of the former golf course is now occupied by the University of Missouri–St. Louis.

== Geography ==
According to the United States Census Bureau, the city has a total area of 0.33 square miles (0.85 km^{2}), all land.

== Demographics ==
Historical population
Census	Pop.	Note	%±
1940	132		—
1950	180		36.4%
1960	314		74.4%
1970	437		39.2%
1980	255		−41.6%
1990	238		−6.7%
2000	254		6.7%
2010	188		−26.0%
2020	191		1.6%
U.S. Decennial Census

Bellerive Acres, Missouri – Racial and ethnic composition Note: the US Census treats Hispanic/Latino as an ethnic category. This table excludes Latinos from the racial categories and assigns them to a separate category. Hispanics/Latinos may be of any race.
Race / Ethnicity (NH = Non-Hispanic)	Pop 2000	Pop 2010	Pop 2020	% 2000	% 2010	% 2020
White alone (NH)	154	103	98	61.42%	54.79%	51.31%
Black or African American alone (NH)	84	81	84	33.07%	43.09%	43.98%
Native American or Alaska Native alone (NH)	0	0	0	0.00%	0.00%	0.00%
Asian alone (NH)	0	0	0	0.00%	0.00%	0.00%
Native Hawaiian or Pacific Islander alone (NH)	0	0	0	0.00%	0.00%	0.00%
Other race alone (NH)	3	0	0	1.18%	0.00%	0.00%
Mixed race or Multiracial (NH)	4	4	3	1.57%	2.13%	1.57%
Hispanic or Latino (any race)	7	0	6	2.76%	0.00%	3.14%
Total	254	188	191	100.00%	100.00%	100.00%

=== 2010 census ===
As of the census of 2010, there were 188 people, 82 households, and 63 families living in the then-village. The population density was 569.7 inhabitants per square mile (220.0/km^{2}). There were 87 housing units at an average density of 263.6 per square mile (101.8/km^{2}). The racial makeup of the village was 54.8% White, 43.1% African American, and 2.1% from two or more races.

There were 82 households, of which 24.4% had children under the age of 18 living with them, 62.2% were married couples living together, 12.2% had a female householder with no husband present, 2.4% had a male householder with no wife present, and 23.2% were non-families. 20.7% of all households were made up of individuals, and 11% had someone living alone who was 65 years of age or older. The average household size was 2.29 and the average family size was 2.63.

The median age in the village was 54.2 years. 16% of residents were under the age of 18; 3.6% were between the ages of 18 and 24; 12.7% were from 25 to 44; 46.8% were from 45 to 64; and 20.7% were 65 years of age or older. The gender makeup of the village was 46.3% male and 53.7% female.

=== 2000 census ===
As of the census of 2000, there were 254 people, 96 households, and 79 families living in the city. The population density was 713.0 inhabitants per square mile (275.3/km^{2}). There were 98 housing units at an average density of 275.1 per square mile (106.2/km^{2}). The racial makeup of the village was 62.99% White, 33.07% African American, 1.57% from other races, and 2.36% from two or more races. Hispanic or Latino of any race were 2.76% of the population.

There were 96 households, out of which 32.3% had children under the age of 18 living with them, 69.8% were married couples living together, 11.5% had a female householder with no husband present, and 17.7% were non-families. 17.7% of all households were made up of individuals, and 7.3% had someone living alone who was 65 years of age or older. The average household size was 2.65 and the average family size was 2.92.

In the village, the population was spread out, with 27.2% under the age of 18, 4.3% from 18 to 24, 17.7% from 25 to 44, 38.6% from 45 to 64, and 12.2% who were 65 years of age or older. The median age was 45 years. For every 100 females, there were 86.8 males. For every 100 females age 18 and over, there were 81.4 males.

The median income for a household in the village was $87,400, and the median income for a family was $93,906. Males had a median income of $80,575 versus $44,583 for females. The per capita income for the village was $42,336. About 2.9% of families and 5.3% of the population were below the poverty line, including 10.6% of those under the age of eighteen and none of those 65 or over.

== Education ==
It is in the Normandy Schools Collaborative school district. The comprehensive high school of the district is Normandy High School.

The Chancellor's Residence of the University of Missouri–St. Louis is located in Bellerive Acres.

== Police Services ==
Police services are provided by contract with the neighboring city of Normandy.
