= Wellston, Missouri =

- City
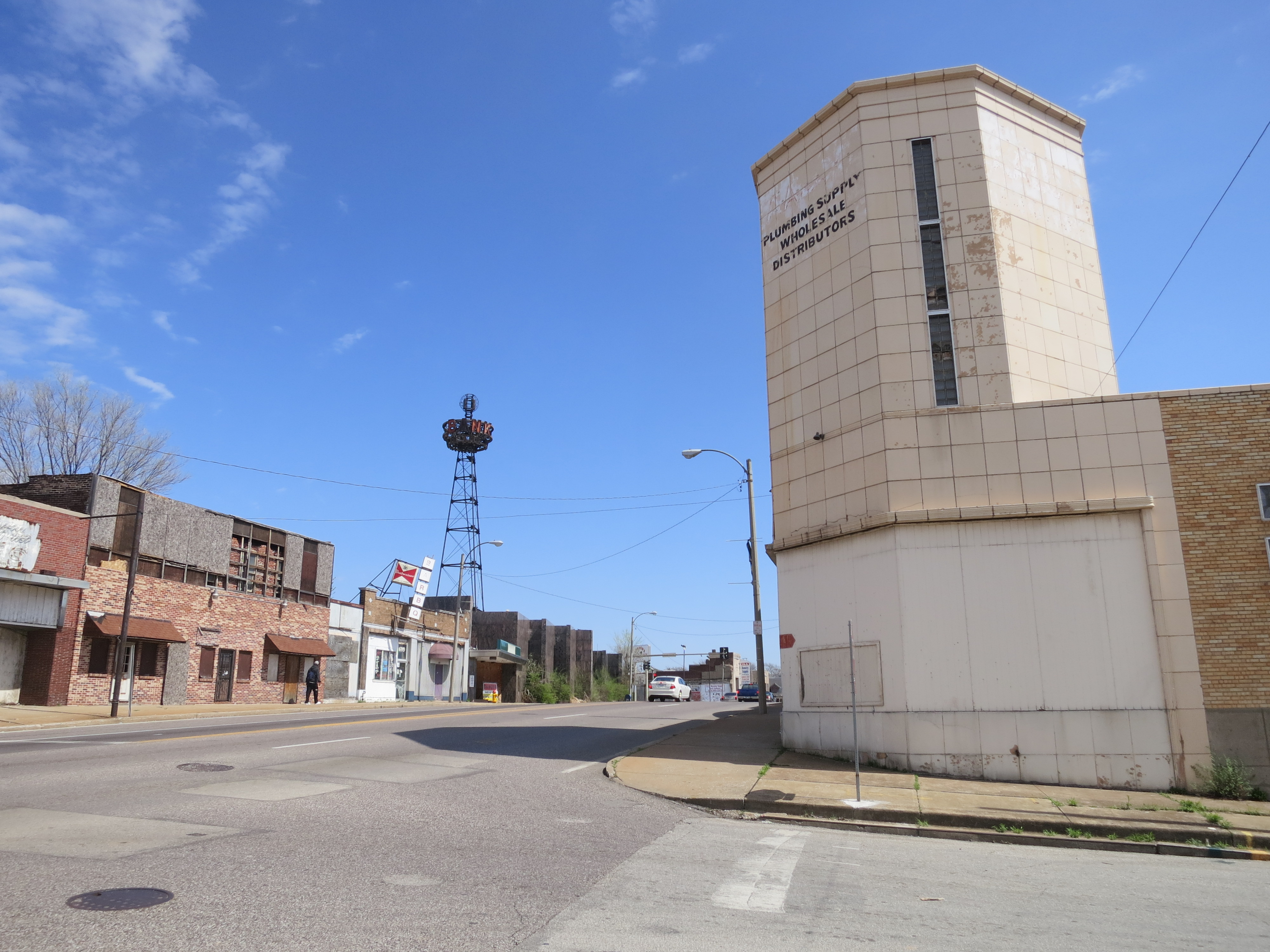
- Dr Martin Luther King Drive in Wellston

- Location of Wellston, Missouri
- Coordinates: 38°40′30″N 90°17′39″W
- Country: United States
- State: Missouri
- County: St. Louis
- Incorporated: 1909
- Dissolved: 1912
- Re-incorporated: 1949

Area
  - Total: 0.93 sq mi (2.41 km^{2})
  - Land: 0.93 sq mi (2.41 km^{2})
  - Water: 0 sq mi (0.00 km^{2})
- Elevation: 548 ft (167 m)

Population (2020)
  - Total: 1,537
  - Density: 1,648.6/sq mi (636.54/km^{2})
- Time zone: UTC-6 (Central (CST))
  - Summer (DST): UTC-5 (CDT)
- FIPS code: 29-78370
- GNIS feature ID: 2397251

Wellston is a city in St. Louis County, Missouri, United States, along the northwest border of the city of St. Louis. As of the 2020 census, Wellston had a population of 1,537.

== History ==
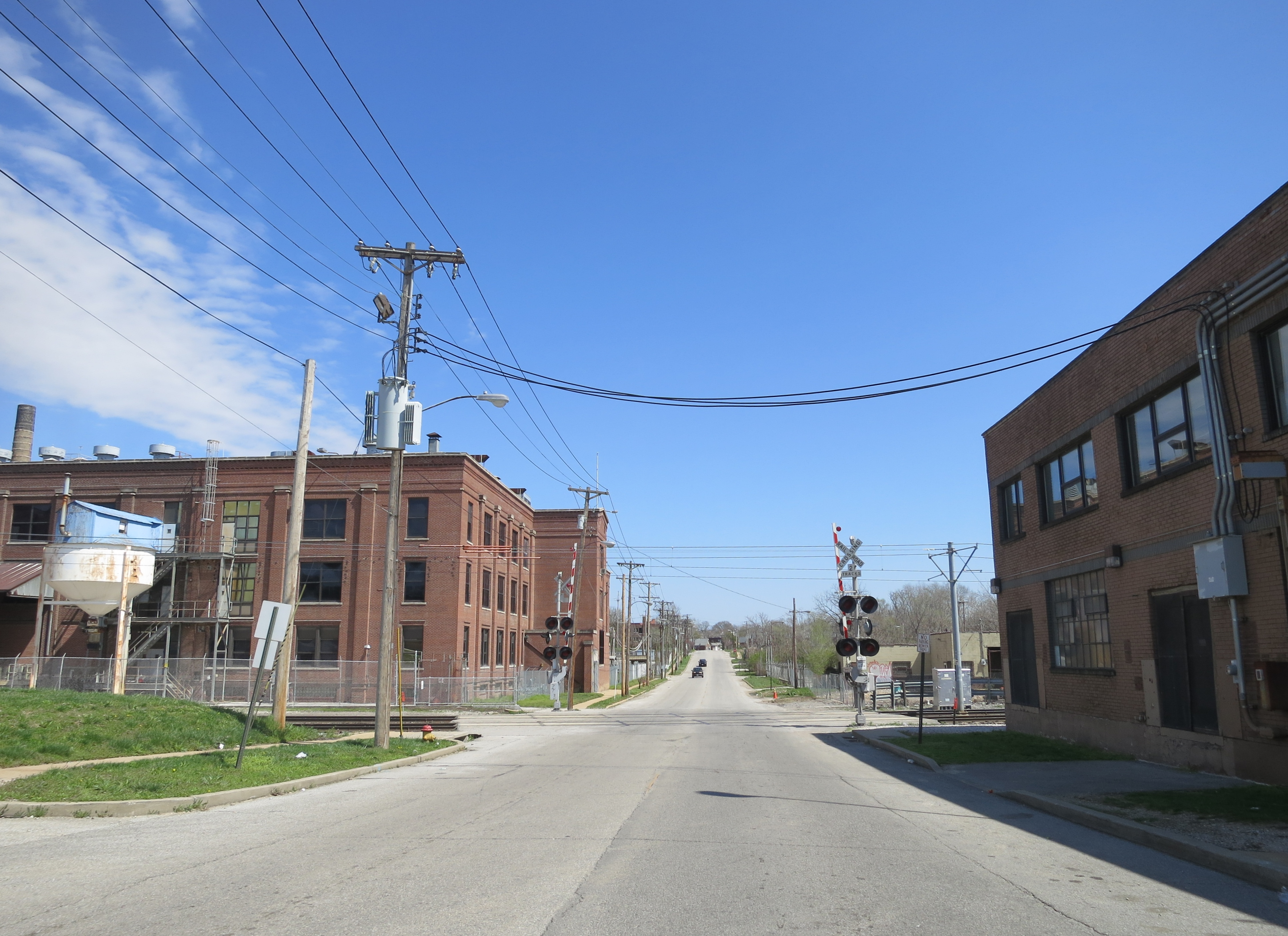
Industrial area in Wellston

Wellston was incorporated as a city in 1909. Due to "government difficulties" the city was dissolved three years later, becoming an unincorporated place in Central Township, only to be reestablished as a city in 1949. The city was named for Erastus Wells.

During the early 1900s, the Wagner Electric Company, a manufacturer of small motors for appliances and transformers, began development along Plymouth Avenue in Wellston, growing to occupy the entire block and providing 4,500 jobs during World War I. North of the Wagner site, ABEX Corporation built a steel foundry that began operation in 1923.

In 1982 ABEX moved out of its Wellston location; the next year, the Wagner Electric Company closed its doors. After closure, it took 22 years, and millions of dollars in tax credits and development grants, for the St. Louis County Economic Council to demolish five buildings and clean up 15 acres (6.1 ha) of the Wagner brownfield land along the MetroLink so that it could be made marketable as the Plymouth Industrial Park.

== Geography ==
According to the United States Census Bureau, the city has a total area of 0.93 square miles (2.41 km^{2}), all land.

== Transportation ==
Wellston has a few major roads within its boundaries, including Missouri Route 180, Missouri Route 340, and SR-D.

Wellston station is the main St. Louis MetroLink station for Wellston, featuring 243 park and ride spaces. It is located at 6402 Plymouth Avenue and serves an average of 1,569 passengers daily. Rock Road station is a MetroLink station on the edge of Wellston, featuring 183 park and ride spaces and averaging 2,408 passengers daily. Rock Road Station is located at 7019 St. Charles Rock Road, a major connecting highway between St. Louis City and northwest St. Louis County.

== Education ==
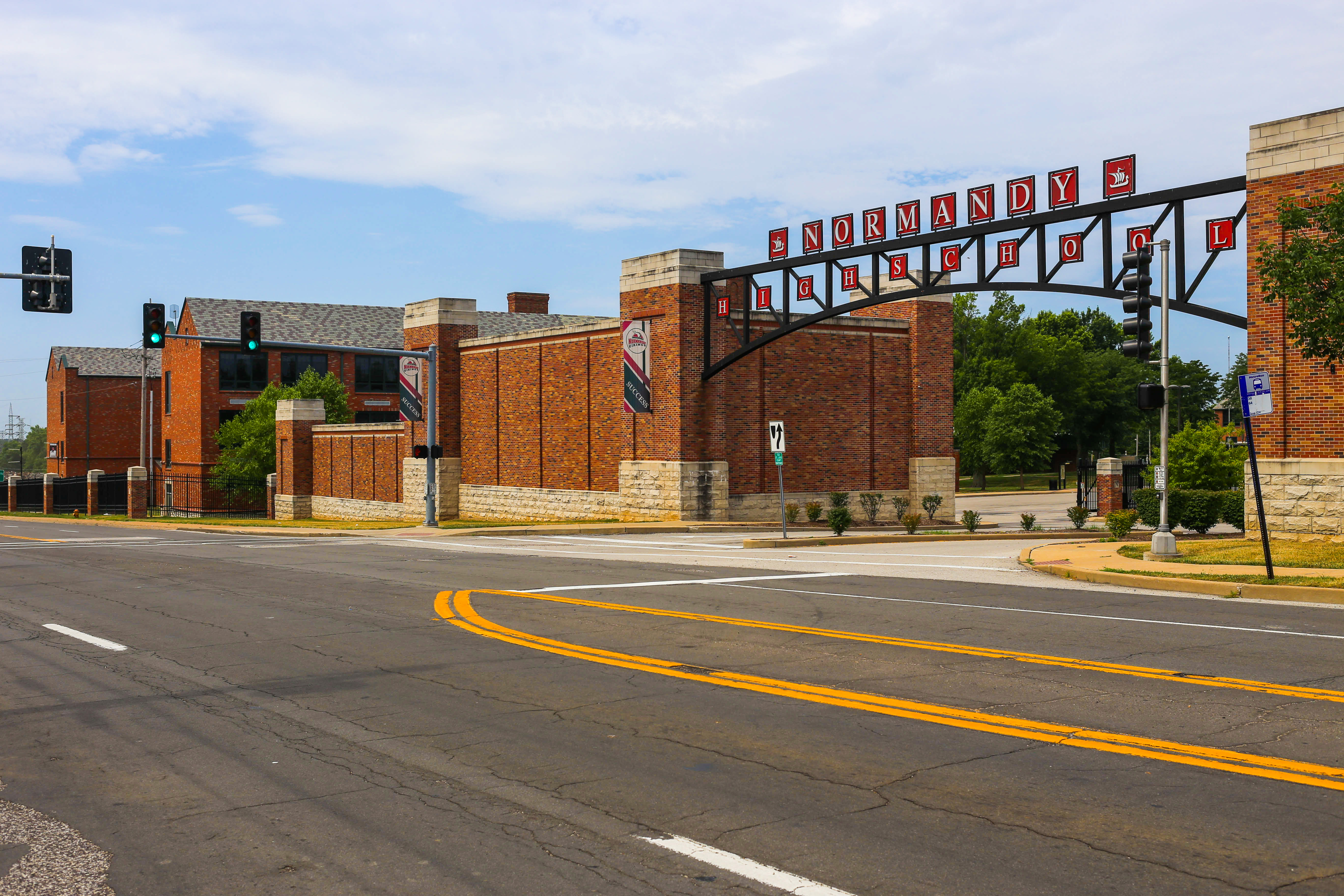
Normandy High School, in Wellston

The vast majority of the municipality in the Normandy Schools Collaborative school district. The comprehensive high school of the district is Normandy High School, located in Wellston.

A small piece is in the University City School District. The comprehensive high school of that district is University City High School.

Formerly most of Wellston was in the Wellston School District. The Wellston School District was disbanded effective 2010 and absorbed by the Normandy district.

== Demographics ==
Historical population
Census	Pop.	Note	%±
1910	7,312		—
1950	9,396		—
1960	7,979		−15.1%
1970	7,050		−11.6%
1980	4,495		−36.2%
1990	3,612		−19.6%
2000	2,460		−31.9%
2010	2,313		−6.0%
2020	1,537		−33.5%
U.S. Decennial Census

Wellston is one of the 10 poorest cities in Missouri (2010).

=== Racial and ethnic composition ===
Wellston, Missouri – Racial and ethnic composition Note: the US Census treats Hispanic/Latino as an ethnic category. This table excludes Latinos from the racial categories and assigns them to a separate category. Hispanics/Latinos may be of any race.
Race / Ethnicity (NH = Non-Hispanic)	Pop 2000	Pop 2010	Pop 2020	% 2000	% 2010	% 2020
White alone (NH)	155	54	35	6.30%	2.33%	2.28%
Black or African American alone (NH)	2,245	2,200	1,430	91.26%	95.11%	93.04%
Native American or Alaska Native alone (NH)	11	3	5	0.45%	0.13%	0.33%
Asian alone (NH)	4	5	1	0.16%	0.22%	0.07%
Native Hawaiian or Pacific Islander alone (NH)	1	0	0	0.04%	0.00%	0.00%
Other race alone (NH)	3	3	10	0.12%	0.13%	0.65%
Mixed race or Multiracial (NH)	15	39	31	0.61%	1.69%	2.02%
Hispanic or Latino (any race)	26	9	25	1.06%	0.39%	1.63%
Total	2,460	2,313	1,537	100.00%	100.00%	100.00%

=== 2020 census ===
As of the 2020 census, Wellston had a population of 1,537. The median age was 31.8 years. 32.3% of residents were under the age of 18 and 11.6% of residents were 65 years of age or older. For every 100 females there were 85.6 males, and for every 100 females age 18 and over there were 73.3 males age 18 and over.

100.0% of residents lived in urban areas, while 0.0% lived in rural areas.

There were 560 households in Wellston, of which 43.0% had children under the age of 18 living in them. Of all households, 11.8% were married-couple households, 23.0% were households with a male householder and no spouse or partner present, and 57.1% were households with a female householder and no spouse or partner present. About 28.6% of all households were made up of individuals and 10.4% had someone living alone who was 65 years of age or older.

There were 773 housing units, of which 27.6% were vacant. The homeowner vacancy rate was 7.3% and the rental vacancy rate was 21.8%.

=== 2010 census ===
As of the census of 2010, there were 2,313 people, 785 households, and 540 families living in the city. The population density was 2,487.1 inhabitants per square mile (960.3/km^{2}). There were 999 housing units at an average density of 1,074.2 per square mile (414.8/km^{2}). The racial makeup of the city was 2.4% White, 95.4% African American, 0.1% Native American, 0.2% Asian, 0.1% from other races, and 1.7% from two or more races. Hispanic or Latino of any race were 0.4% of the population.

There were 785 households, of which 47.8% had children under the age of 18 living with them, 14.6% were married couples living together, 47.5% had a female householder with no husband present, 6.6% had a male householder with no wife present, and 31.2% were non-families. 27.1% of all households were made up of individuals, and 9.1% had someone living alone who was 65 years of age or older. The average household size was 2.95 and the average family size was 3.62.

The median age in the city was 26.2 years. 37% of residents were under the age of 18; 11.4% were between the ages of 18 and 24; 23.6% were from 25 to 44; 19.6% were from 45 to 64; and 8.4% were 65 years of age or older. The gender makeup of the city was 44.9% male and 55.1% female.

=== 2000 census ===
As of the census of 2000, there were 2,460 people, 779 households, and 578 families living in the city. The population density was 2,732.6 inhabitants per square mile (1,055.1/km^{2}). There were 961 housing units at an average density of 1,067.5 per square mile (412.2/km^{2}). The racial makeup of the city was 92.07% African American, 6.30% White, 0.45% Native American, 0.16% Asian, 0.04% Pacific Islander, 0.37% from other races, and 0.61% from two or more races. Hispanic or Latino of any race were 1.06% of the population.

There were 779 households, out of which 36.6% had children under the age of 18 living with them, 22.3% were married couples living together, 44.9% had a female householder with no husband present, and 25.7% were non-families. 23.6% of all households were made up of individuals, and 9.5% had someone living alone who was 65 years of age or older. The average household size was 3.08 and the average family size was 3.64.

In the city the population was spread out, with 35.7% under the age of 18, 12.4% from 18 to 24, 23.8% from 25 to 44, 17.6% from 45 to 64, and 10.5% who were 65 years of age or older. The median age was 27 years. For every 100 females, there were 82.8 males. For every 100 females age 18 and over, there were 75.3 males.

The median income for a household in the city was $18,596, and the median income for a family was $20,625. Males had a median income of $21,264 versus $18,917 for females. The per capita income for the city was $6,262. About 59.2% of families and 68.1% of the population were below the poverty line, including 70.1% of those under age 18 and 78.6% of those age 65 or over.

== Notable people ==
Ben McLemore (born 1993), NBA player
