= Uplands Park, Missouri =

- Village
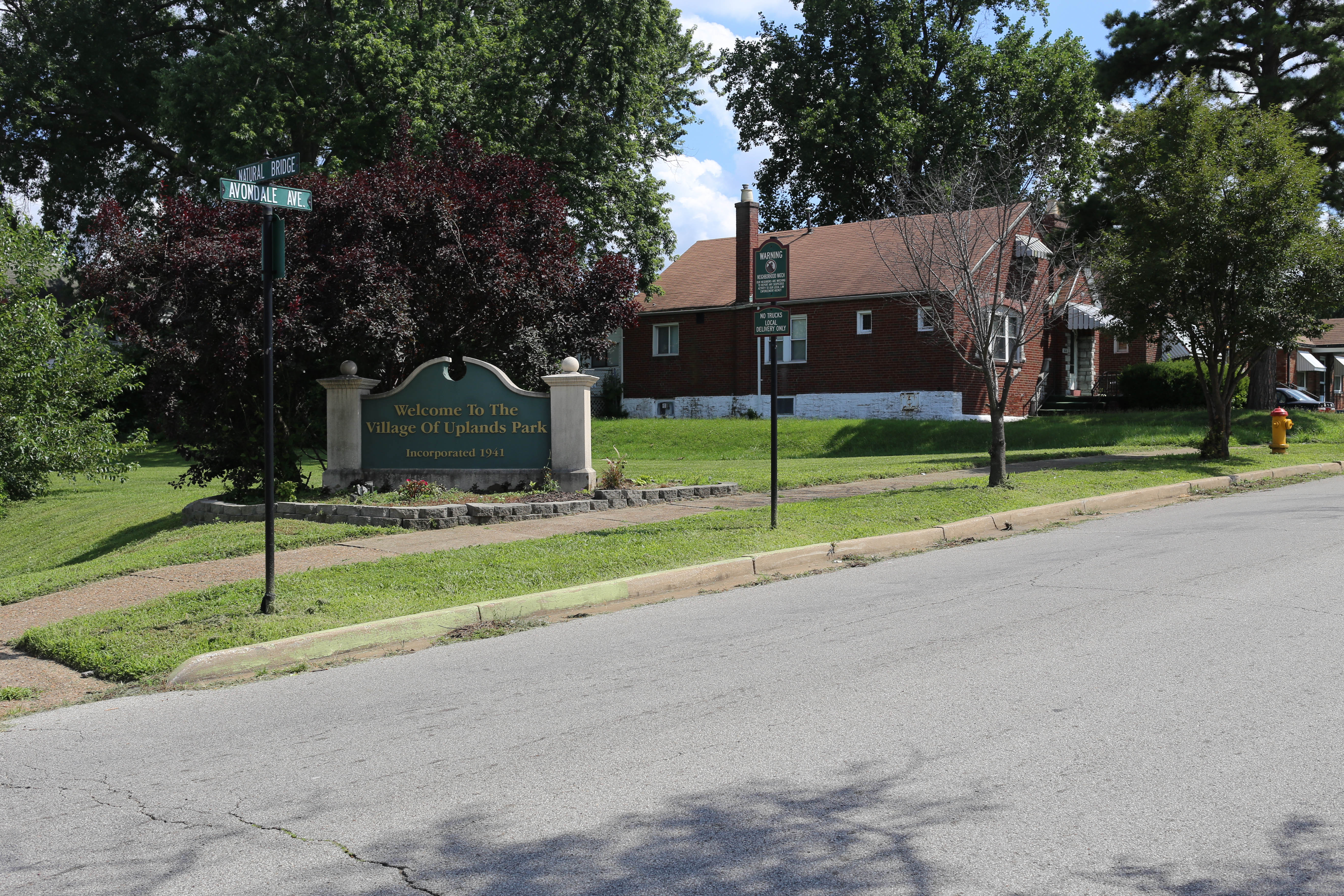
- Welcome sign for Uplands Park, Missouri, July 2016

- Location of Uplands Park, Missouri
- Coordinates: 38°41′34″N 90°16′58″W
- Country: United States
- State: Missouri
- County: St. Louis
- Township: Normandy

Area
  - Total: 0.066 sq mi (0.17 km^{2})
  - Land: 0.066 sq mi (0.17 km^{2})
  - Water: 0 sq mi (0.00 km^{2})
- Elevation: 604 ft (184 m)

Population (2020)
  - Total: 312
  - Density: 4,731.1/sq mi (1,826.67/km^{2})
- Time zone: UTC-6 (Central (CST))
  - Summer (DST): UTC-5 (CDT)
- ZIP code: 63121
- Area code: 314/557
- FIPS code: 29-75238
- GNIS feature ID: 2400031
- Website: uplandsparkmo.com

Uplands Park is a village in Normandy Township, St. Louis County, Missouri, United States. The population was 312 at the 2020 census. The village is one of many small majority black communities located in the Natural Bridge corridor of mid-St. Louis County, characterized by small homes on small lots.

== Geography ==
According to the United States Census Bureau, the village has a total area of 0.07 square miles (0.18 km^{2}), all land.

== Demographics ==
Historical population
Census	Pop.	Note	%±
1950	563		—
1960	549		−2.5%
1970	695		26.6%
1980	576		−17.1%
1990	499		−13.4%
2000	460		−7.8%
2010	445		−3.3%
2020	312		−29.9%
U.S. Decennial Census

=== 2020 census ===
Uplands Park village, Missouri – Racial and ethnic composition Note: the US Census treats Hispanic/Latino as an ethnic category. This table excludes Latinos from the racial categories and assigns them to a separate category. Hispanics/Latinos may be of any race.
Race / Ethnicity (NH = Non-Hispanic)	Pop 2000	Pop 2010	Pop 2020	% 2000	% 2010	% 2020
White alone (NH)	6	9	3	1.30%	2.02%	0.96%
Black or African American alone (NH)	444	426	299	96.52%	95.73%	95.83%
Native American or Alaska Native alone (NH)	0	5	2	0.00%	1.12%	0.64%
Asian alone (NH)	1	0	0	0.22%	0.00%	0.00%
Native Hawaiian or Pacific Islander alone (NH)	0	0	0	0.00%	0.00%	0.00%
Other race alone (NH)	0	0	1	0.00%	0.00%	0.32%
Mixed race or Multiracial (NH)	5	0	4	1.09%	0.00%	1.28%
Hispanic or Latino (any race)	4	5	3	0.87%	1.12%	0.96%
Total	460	445	312	100.00%	100.00%	100.00%

=== 2010 census ===
As of the census of 2010, there were 445 people, 168 households, and 127 families living in the village. The population density was 6,357.1 inhabitants per square mile (2,454.5/km^{2}). There were 187 housing units at an average density of 2,671.4 per square mile (1,031.4/km^{2}). The racial makeup of the village was 2.0% White, 96.4% African American, 1.1% Native American, and 0.4% from other races. Hispanic or Latino of any race were 1.1% of the population.

There were 168 households, of which 32.1% had children under the age of 18 living with them, 36.9% were married couples living together, 31.0% had a female householder with no husband present, 7.7% had a male householder with no wife present, and 24.4% were non-families. 20.2% of all households were made up of individuals, and 8.9% had someone living alone who was 65 years of age or older. The average household size was 2.65 and the average family size was 3.04.

The median age in the village was 45.2 years. 21.8% of residents were under the age of 18; 7.8% were between the ages of 18 and 24; 20.1% were from 25 to 44; 30.4% were from 45 to 64; and 20% were 65 years of age or older. The gender makeup of the village was 44.7% male and 55.3% female.

=== 2000 census ===
As of the census of 2000, there were 460 people, 166 households, and 129 families living in the village. The population density was 6,904.3 inhabitants per square mile (2,665.8/km^{2}). There were 181 housing units at an average density of 2,716.7 per square mile (1,048.9/km^{2}). The racial makeup of the village was 1.30% White, 97.39% African American, 0.22% Asian, and 1.09% from two or more races. Hispanic or Latino of any race were 0.87% of the population.

There were 166 households, out of which 20.5% had children under the age of 18 living with them, 45.2% were married couples living together, 24.7% had a female householder with no husband present, and 21.7% were non-families. 18.7% of all households were made up of individuals, and 9.6% had someone living alone who was 65 years of age or older. The average household size was 2.77 and the average family size was 3.05.

In the village, the population was spread out, with 24.3% under the age of 18, 5.9% from 18 to 24, 22.0% from 25 to 44, 30.9% from 45 to 64, and 17.0% who were 65 years of age or older. The median age was 43 years. For every 100 females, there were 98.3 males. For every 100 females age 18 and over, there were 88.1 males.

The median income for a household in the village was $49,286, and the median income for a family was $54,250. Males had a median income of $28,333 versus $25,114 for females. The per capita income for the village was $17,041. About 3.9% of families and 4.8% of the population were below the poverty line, including 3.6% of those under age 18 and 5.8% of those age 65 or over.

== Education ==
It is in the Normandy Schools Collaborative school district. The comprehensive high school of the district is Normandy High School.
