= Glen Echo Park, Missouri =

- Former Village
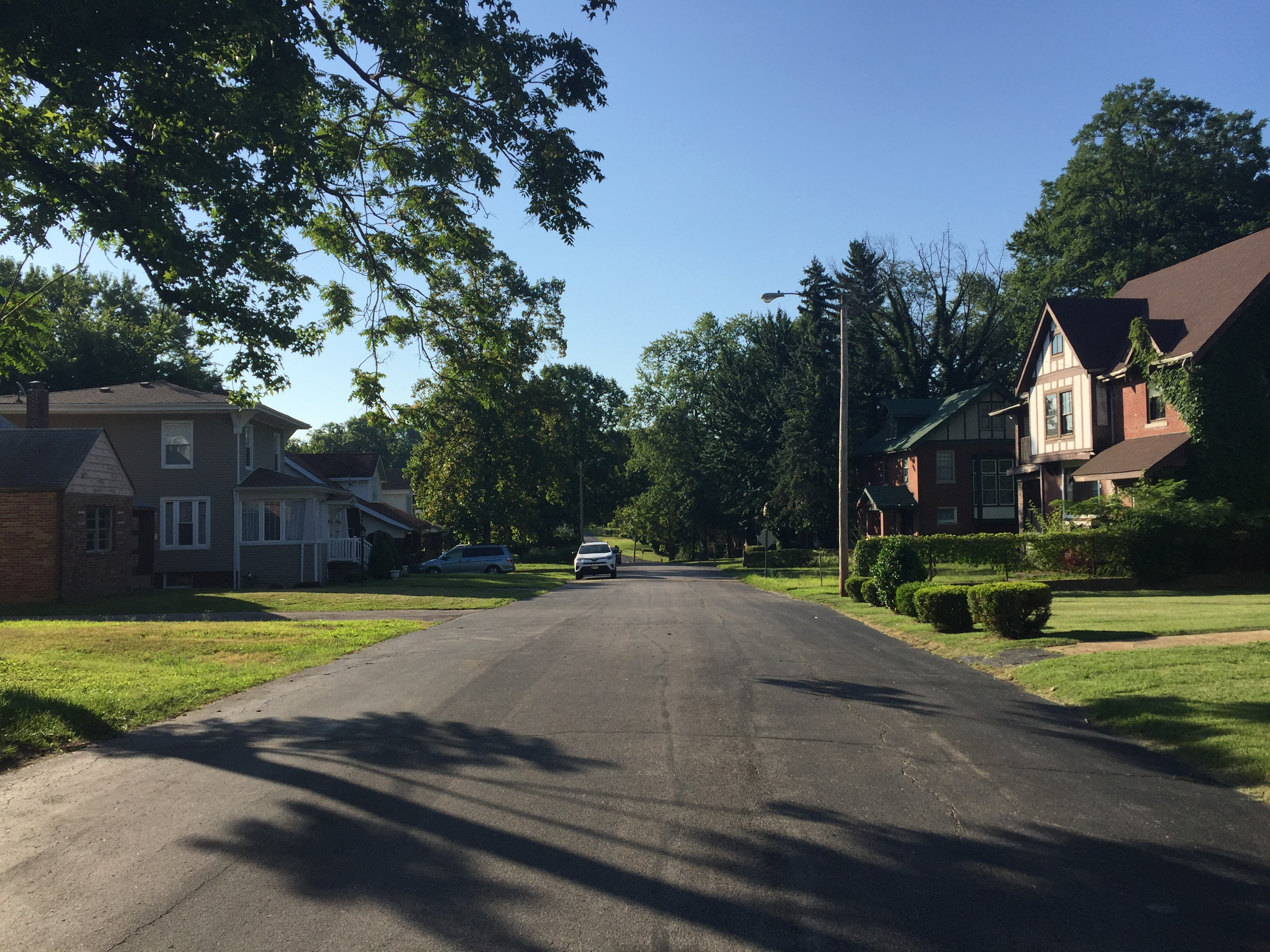
- Glen Echo Historic District in Glen Echo Park, July 2017

- Location of Glen Echo Park, Missouri
- Coordinates: 38°42′03″N 90°17′47″W
- Country: United States
- State: Missouri
- County: St. Louis

Area
  - Total: 0.031 sq mi (0.08 km^{2})
  - Land: 0.031 sq mi (0.08 km^{2})
  - Water: 0 sq mi (0.00 km^{2})
- Elevation: 630 ft (190 m)

Population (2020)
  - Total: 122
  - Density: 3,809.0/sq mi (1,470.68/km^{2})
- Time zone: UTC-6 (Central (CST))
  - Summer (DST): UTC-5 (CDT)
- FIPS code: 29-27370
- GNIS feature ID: 2398971

Glen Echo Park was a village in St. Louis County, Missouri, United States. The population was 122 at the 2020 census. The community took its name from the nearby Glen Echo Country Club.

In August 2023, voters of Glen Echo Park and neighboring Normandy voted to consolidate the two municipalities. The merger took effect on February 8, 2024, with Glen Echo Park being fully incorporated into Normandy.

== Geography ==
According to the United States Census Bureau, the village has a total area of 0.03 square miles (0.08 km^{2}), all land.

== Demographics ==
Historical population
Census	Pop.	Note	%±
1940	212		—
1950	217		2.4%
1960	333		53.5%
1970	268		−19.5%
1980	249		−7.1%
1990	304		22.1%
2000	166		−45.4%
2010	160		−3.6%
2020	122		−23.7%
U.S. Decennial Census

=== 2020 census ===
Glen Echo Park village, Missouri – Racial and ethnic composition Note: the US Census treats Hispanic/Latino as an ethnic category. This table excludes Latinos from the racial categories and assigns them to a separate category. Hispanics/Latinos may be of any race.
Race / Ethnicity (NH = Non-Hispanic)	Pop 2000	Pop 2010	Pop 2020	% 2000	% 2010	% 2020
White alone (NH)	19	13	13	11.45%	8.13%	10.66%
Black or African American alone (NH)	145	145	94	87.35%	90.63%	77.05%
Native American or Alaska Native alone (NH)	1	0	2	0.60%	0.00%	1.64%
Asian alone (NH)	0	0	0	0.00%	0.00%	0.00%
Pacific Islander alone (NH)	0	0	0	0.00%	0.00%	0.00%
Other Race alone (NH)	0	0	1	0.00%	0.00%	0.82%
Mixed race or Multiracial (NH)	0	0	7	0.00%	0.00%	5.74%
Hispanic or Latino (any race)	1	2	5	0.60%	1.25%	4.10%
Total	166	160	122	100.00%	100.00%	100.00%

=== 2010 census ===
As of the census of 2010, there were 160 people, 57 households, and 37 families living in the village. The population density was 5,333.3 inhabitants per square mile (2,059.2/km^{2}). There were 64 housing units at an average density of 2,133.3 per square mile (823.7/km^{2}). The racial makeup of the village was 8.1% White and 91.9% African American. Hispanic or Latino of any race were 1.3% of the population.

There were 57 households, of which 26.3% had children under the age of 18 living with them, 40.4% were married couples living together, 15.8% had a female householder with no husband present, 8.8% had a male householder with no wife present, and 35.1% were non-families. 28.1% of all households were made up of individuals, and 10.6% had someone living alone who was 65 years of age or older. The average household size was 2.81 and the average family size was 3.54.

The median age in the village was 41 years. 21.2% of residents were under the age of 18; 10.7% were between the ages of 18 and 24; 23.8% were from 25 to 44; 25.7% were from 45 to 64; and 18.8% were 65 years of age or older. The gender makeup of the village was 45.0% male and 55.0% female.

=== 2000 census ===
As of the census of 2000, there were 166 people, 63 households, and 50 families living in the village. The population density was 5,416.5 inhabitants per square mile (2,091.3/km^{2}). There were 66 housing units at an average density of 2,153.6 per square mile (831.5/km^{2}). The racial makeup of the village was 11.45% White, 87.95% African American and 0.60% Native American. Hispanic or Latino of any race were 0.60% of the population.

There were 63 households, out of which 28.6% had children under the age of 18 living with them, 55.6% were married couples living together, 19.0% had a female householder with no husband present, and 20.6% were non-families. 19.0% of all households were made up of individuals, and none had someone living alone who was 65 years of age or older. The average household size was 2.63 and the average family size was 3.02.

In the village, the population was spread out, with 25.9% under the age of 18, 4.2% from 18 to 24, 22.3% from 25 to 44, 31.3% from 45 to 64, and 16.3% who were 65 years of age or older. The median age was 44 years. For every 100 females, there were 104.9 males. For every 100 females age 18 and over, there were 92.2 males.

The median income for a household in the village was $71,250, and the median income for a family was $80,833. Males had a median income of $62,917 versus $40,417 for females. The per capita income for the village was $24,564. None of the population or families were below the poverty line.

== Education ==
It is in the Normandy Schools Collaborative school district. The comprehensive high school of the district is Normandy High School.
