= Northwoods, Missouri =

- City
- Location of Northwoods, Missouri
- Coordinates: 38°42′13″N 90°16′57″W
- Country: United States
- State: Missouri
- County: St. Louis

Government
  - Mayor: Everett Thomas

Area
  - Total: 0.70 sq mi (1.81 km^{2})
  - Land: 0.70 sq mi (1.81 km^{2})
  - Water: 0 sq mi (0.00 km^{2})
- Elevation: 607 ft (185 m)

Population (2020)
  - Total: 3,687
  - Density: 5,278.6/sq mi (2,038.06/km^{2})
- Time zone: UTC-6 (Central (CST))
  - Summer (DST): UTC-5 (CDT)
- ZIP code: 63121
- Area code: 314
- FIPS code: 29-53408
- GNIS feature ID: 2395271
- Website: Official website

Northwoods is a city in St. Louis County, Missouri, United States. As of the 2020 census, Northwoods had a population of 3,687.

== Geography ==
According to the United States Census Bureau, the city has a total area of 0.71 square miles (1.84 km^{2}), all land.

== Demographics ==
Historical population
Census	Pop.	Note	%±
1940	733		—
1950	1,602		118.6%
1960	4,701		193.4%
1970	4,607		−2.0%
1980	5,831		26.6%
1990	5,106		−12.4%
2000	4,643		−9.1%
2010	4,227		−9.0%
2020	3,687		−12.8%
U.S. Decennial Census

=== Racial and ethnic composition ===
Northwoods, Missouri – Racial and ethnic composition Note: the US Census treats Hispanic/Latino as an ethnic category. This table excludes Latinos from the racial categories and assigns them to a separate category. Hispanics/Latinos may be of any race.
Race / Ethnicity (NH = Non-Hispanic)	Pop 2000	Pop 2010	Pop 2020	% 2000	% 2010	% 2020
White alone (NH)	290	182	113	6.25%	4.31%	3.06%
Black or African American alone (NH)	4,293	3,968	3,420	92.46%	93.87%	92.76%
Native American or Alaska Native alone (NH)	2	8	3	0.04%	0.19%	0.08%
Asian alone (NH)	6	12	6	0.13%	0.28%	0.16%
Native Hawaiian or Pacific Islander alone (NH)	0	0	2	0.00%	0.00%	0.05%
Other race alone (NH)	5	3	16	0.11%	0.07%	0.43%
Mixed race or Multiracial (NH)	37	44	90	0.80%	1.04%	2.44%
Hispanic or Latino (any race)	10	10	37	0.22%	0.24%	1.00%
Total	4,643	4,227	3,687	100.00%	100.00%	100.00%

=== 2020 census ===
As of the 2020 census, Northwoods had a population of 3,687. The median age was 45.9 years. 21.0% of residents were under the age of 18 and 25.2% of residents were 65 years of age or older. For every 100 females there were 79.4 males, and for every 100 females age 18 and over there were 72.6 males age 18 and over.

100.0% of residents lived in urban areas, while 0.0% lived in rural areas.

There were 1,502 households in Northwoods, of which 26.0% had children under the age of 18 living in them. Of all households, 25.4% were married-couple households, 19.7% were households with a male householder and no spouse or partner present, and 49.9% were households with a female householder and no spouse or partner present. About 31.2% of all households were made up of individuals and 15.8% had someone living alone who was 65 years of age or older.

There were 1,771 housing units, of which 15.2% were vacant. The homeowner vacancy rate was 3.7% and the rental vacancy rate was 21.0%.

=== 2010 census ===
As of the census of 2010, there were 4,227 people, 1,651 households, and 1,126 families living in the city. The population density was 5,953.5 inhabitants per square mile (2,298.7/km^{2}). There were 1,817 housing units at an average density of 2,559.2 per square mile (988.1/km^{2}). The racial makeup of the city was 4.3% White, 93.9% African American, 0.2% Native American, 0.3% Asian, 0.1% from other races, and 1.2% from two or more races. Hispanic or Latino of any race were 0.2% of the population.

There were 1,651 households, of which 31.4% had children under the age of 18 living with them, 30.0% were married couples living together, 32.8% had a female householder with no husband present, 5.4% had a male householder with no wife present, and 31.8% were non-families. 28.0% of all households were made up of individuals, and 12.3% had someone living alone who was 65 years of age or older. The average household size was 2.51 and the average family size was 3.04.

The median age in the city was 42.7 years. 22.6% of residents were under the age of 18; 8.1% were between the ages of 18 and 24; 21.5% were from 25 to 44; 27.7% were from 45 to 64; and 20.1% were 65 years of age or older. The gender makeup of the city was 43.1% male and 56.9% female.

=== 2000 census ===
As of the census of 2000, there were 4,643 people, 1,718 households, and 1,262 families living in the city. The population density was 6,545.7 inhabitants per square mile (2,527.3/km^{2}). There were 1,823 housing units at an average density of 2,570.0 per square mile (992.3/km^{2}). The racial makeup of the city was 6.25% White, 92.66% African American, 0.04% Native American, 0.13% Asian, 0.11% from other races, and 0.82% from two or more races. Hispanic or Latino of any race were 0.22% of the population.

There were 1,718 households, out of which 25.7% had children under the age of 18 living with them, 39.0% were married couples living together, 28.8% had a female householder with no husband present, and 26.5% were non-families. 23.7% of all households were made up of individuals, and 8.3% had someone living alone who was 65 years of age or older. The average household size was 2.63 and the average family size was 3.09.

In the city, the population was spread out, with 24.1% under the age of 18, 8.1% from 18 to 24, 24.1% from 25 to 44, 28.2% from 45 to 64, and 15.6% who were 65 years of age or older. The median age was 40 years. For every 100 females, there were 78.9 males. For every 100 females age 18 and over, there were 73.0 males.

The median income for a household in the city was $37,938, and the median income for a family was $42,475. Males had a median income of $28,953 versus $27,334 for females. The per capita income for the city was $19,803. About 8.3% of families and 10.2% of the population were below the poverty line, including 13.3% of those under age 18 and 4.0% of those age 65 or over.

== Education ==
It is in the Normandy Schools Collaborative school district.

The former Garfield School had a Northwoods postal address, but was in Pine Lawn. It consolidated into Obama Elementary in Pine Lawn, effective 2011.

The comprehensive high school of the district is Normandy High School.
