= Velda Village Hills, Missouri =

- City
- Location of Velda Village_Hills, Missouri
- Coordinates: 38°41′32″N 90°17′16″W
- Country: United States
- State: Missouri
- County: St. Louis

Area
  - Total: 0.12 sq mi (0.31 km^{2})
  - Land: 0.12 sq mi (0.31 km^{2})
  - Water: 0 sq mi (0.00 km^{2})
- Elevation: 571 ft (174 m)

Population (2020)
  - Total: 881
  - Density: 7,345.0/sq mi (2,835.93/km^{2})
- Time zone: UTC-6 (Central (CST))
  - Summer (DST): UTC-5 (CDT)
- ZIP code: 63121
- Area code: 314
- FIPS code: 29-75814
- GNIS feature ID: 2400050
- Website: veldavillagehills.us

Velda Village Hills is a city in northeastern St. Louis County, Missouri, United States. As of the 2020 census, Velda Village Hills had a population of 881.

== Geography ==
Velda Village Hills is located at 38°41′32″N 90°17′13″W (38.692351, -90.286987).

According to the United States Census Bureau, the village has a total area of 0.12 square miles (0.31 km^{2}), all land.

Velda Village Hills is one of the most densely populated communities in Missouri, with a density of nearly 9,000 people per square mile.

== Demographics ==
Historical population
Census	Pop.	Note	%±
1950	1,527		—
1960	1,365		−10.6%
1970	1,205		−11.7%
1980	1,432		18.8%
1990	1,315		−8.2%
2000	1,090		−17.1%
2010	1,055		−3.2%
2020	881		−16.5%
U.S. Decennial Census

=== 2020 census ===
Velda Village Hills, Missouri – Racial and ethnic composition Note: the US Census treats Hispanic/Latino as an ethnic category. This table excludes Latinos from the racial categories and assigns them to a separate category. Hispanics/Latinos may be of any race.
Race / Ethnicity (NH = Non-Hispanic)	Pop 2000	Pop 2010	Pop 2020	% 2000	% 2010	% 2020
White alone (NH)	15	9	16	1.38%	0.85%	1.82%
Black or African American alone (NH)	1,068	1,039	830	97.98%	99.48%	94.21%
Native American or Alaska Native alone (NH)	0	0	1	0.00%	0.00%	0.11%
Asian alone (NH)	0	0	2	0.00%	0.00%	0.23%
Native Hawaiian or Pacific Islander alone (NH)	2	0	0	0.18%	0.00%	0.00%
Other race alone (NH)	0	0	6	0.00%	0.00%	0.68%
Mixed race or Multiracial (NH)	1	7	19	0.09%	0.66%	2.16%
Hispanic or Latino (any race)	4	0	7	0.37%	0.00%	0.79%
Total	1,090	1,055	881	100.00%	100.00%	100.00%

=== 2010 census ===
As of the census of 2010, there were 1,055 people, 427 households, and 295 families living in the village. The population density was 8,791.7 inhabitants per square mile (3,394.5/km^{2}). There were 465 housing units at an average density of 3,875.0 per square mile (1,496.1/km^{2}). The racial makeup of the village was 0.9% White, 98.5% African American, and 0.7% from two or more races.

There were 427 households, of which 29.5% had children under the age of 18 living with them, 25.8% were married couples living together, 35.1% had a female householder with no husband present, 8.2% had a male householder with no wife present, and 30.9% were non-families. 26.9% of all households were made up of individuals, and 9.1% had someone living alone who was 65 years of age or older. The average household size was 2.47 and the average family size was 2.97.

The median age in the village was 44.2 years. 21.8% of residents were under the age of 18; 7.6% were between the ages of 18 and 24; 21.7% were from 25 to 44; 28.8% were from 45 to 64; and 20% were 65 years of age or older. The gender makeup of the village was 42.4% male and 57.6% female.

=== 2000 census ===
As of the census of 2000, there were 1,090 people, 428 households, and 314 families living in the village. The population density was 9,235.6 inhabitants per square mile (3,565.9/km^{2}). There were 451 housing units at an average density of 3,821.3 per square mile (1,475.4/km^{2}). The racial makeup of the village was 1.38% White, 98.35% African American, 0.18% Pacific Islander, and 0.09% from two or more races. Hispanic or Latino of any race were 0.37% of the population.

There were 428 households, out of which 23.4% had children under the age of 18 living with them, 36.0% were married couples living together, 31.3% had a female householder with no husband present, and 26.6% were non-families. 23.4% of all households were made up of individuals, and 7.7% had someone living alone who was 65 years of age or older. The average household size was 2.55 and the average family size was 2.99.

In the village, the population was spread out, with 23.9% under the age of 18, 7.4% from 18 to 24, 23.0% from 25 to 44, 30.9% from 45 to 64, and 14.7% who were 65 years of age or older. The median age was 42 years. For every 100 females, there were 79.6 males. For every 100 females age 18 and over, there were 77.1 males.

The median income for a household in the village was $38,173, and the median income for a family was $40,357. Males had a median income of $30,074 versus $23,355 for females. The per capita income for the village was $18,649. About 8.6% of families and 8.8% of the population were below the poverty line, including 10.9% of those under age 18 and 11.9% of those age 65 or over.

== Police services ==
Police service is provided by contract with the North County Police Cooperative.

== Education ==
It is in the Normandy Schools Collaborative school district. The comprehensive high school of the district is Normandy High School.
