= Normandy Township, St. Louis County, Missouri =

Township in the U.S. state of Missouri

Coordinates: 38°41′45″N 90°17′54″W

Normandy Township is a township in St. Louis County, in the U.S. state of Missouri. Its population was 28,142 as of the 2020 census.

== Demographics ==
Normandy Township, St. Louis County, Missouri – Racial and ethnic composition Note: the US Census treats Hispanic/Latino as an ethnic category. This table excludes Latinos from the racial categories and assigns them to a separate category. Hispanics/Latinos may be of any race.
Race / Ethnicity (NH = Non-Hispanic)	Pop 2000	Pop 2010	Pop 2020	% 2000	% 2010	% 2020
White alone (NH)	6,543	4,108	3,051	19.18%	12.63%	10.84%
Black or African American alone (NH)	26,312	27,030	22,991	77.14%	83.13%	81.70%
Native American or Alaska Native alone (NH)	54	69	56	0.16%	0.21%	0.20%
Asian alone (NH)	217	376	355	0.64%	1.16%	1.26%
Native Hawaiian or Pacific Islander alone (NH)	7	3	6	0.02%	0.01%	0.02%
Other race alone (NH)	62	42	138	0.18%	0.13%	0.49%
Mixed race or Multiracial (NH)	468	479	873	1.37%	1.47%	3.10%
Hispanic or Latino (any race)	448	409	672	1.31%	1.26%	2.39%
Total	34,111	32,516	28,142	100.00%	100.00%	100.00%
