= Henry Lucas (baseball) =

Major League Baseball owner and league president

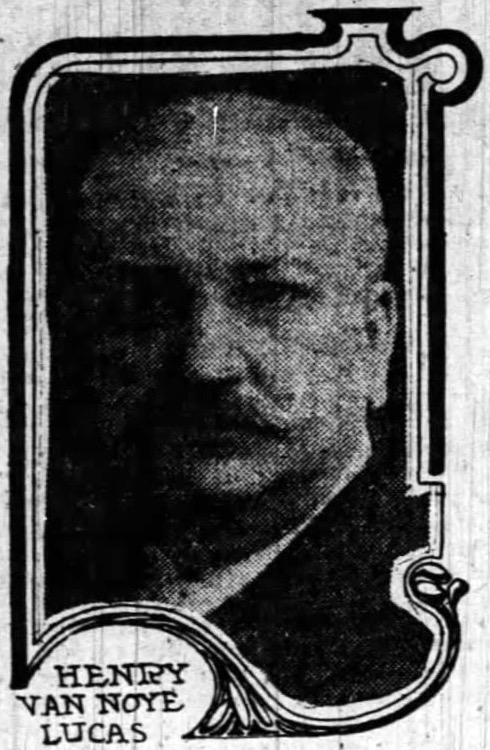
- Lucas as depicted in the St. Louis Globe-Democrat in November 1910
- Born: September 5, 1857; St. Louis, Missouri, United States
- Died: November 15, 1910 (aged 53); St. Louis, Missouri, United States
- Occupations: Owner of the St. Louis Maroons (1884–1886); President of the Union Association (1884)
- Awards: Union Association champions (1884)

Henry Van Noye Lucas (September 5, 1857 – November 15, 1910) was a baseball executive in the late 19th century, president of the Union Association during its one season (1884), and owner of the St. Louis Maroons for three seasons (1884–1886).

== Biography ==
Lucas was born on September 5, 1857, in St. Louis, Missouri. He was the twelfth and youngest child of James H. Lucas and Marie Emilie (Desruisseaux) Lucas. When his father died in 1873, Henry Lucas inherited $2 million of his $9 million estate. He lived on an estate just outside of the city of St. Louis (now part of the present-day town of Normandy, Missouri) and was educated at Saint Louis University. An all-around sports enthusiast, he enjoyed baseball both as a participant and as a spectator.

With the support of other St. Louis investors, in November 1883, Lucas filed papers to incorporate the St. Louis Athletic Association, giving birth to the St. Louis Maroons. In 1884, the 26-year-old Henry became president of the Union Association, a professional baseball major league that operated for only a single season. After the Union Association collapsed, the National League was persuaded to bring the Maroons into the established league, to try to provide some competition for the St. Louis Browns of the American Association. Unfortunately for the Maroons, the Browns were at the peak of their game, winning pennants four straight years (1885–1888). Meanwhile, the Maroons, facing much better competition in the National League, finished well off the National League pace in 1885 and 1886.

Following the 1886 season, the Maroons were sold to the league, which in turn sold it to John T. Brush. Brush moved the team to Indianapolis, where they were renamed the Hoosiers. The Hoosiers folded following the 1889 season.

Of Lucas, it was noted that "during the next few years he turned up at a ballpark or otherwise hinted that he might like to return to the game", but he had to settle instead for employment as a railway clerk with the Vandalia Railroad.

== Personal life ==
Lucas' paternal grandfather was the French-born John Baptiste Charles Lucas, a member of the U.S. House of Representatives from Pennsylvania. His father was James Hunt Lucas, a wealthy businessman and politician.

Lucas married Louise ("Lizzie") Espenschied in 1880. They had one child, Henry V. Lucas Jr., who was born on February 1, 1881.

Lucas died in 1910 in his home city, of blood poisoning from an ankle injury originally suffered years earlier. Lucas was employed as a street department inspector at the time of his death. One newspaper headline following his death read, "Famous Sportsman Who Spends Millions in Fruitless Baseball War Dies in Poverty".
