= Charles Lucas (Missouri lawyer) =

American politician (1792–1817)

Charles Lucas (September 25, 1792 – September 27, 1817) was an entrepreneur and legislator in Missouri Territory who was killed in a duel with U.S. Senator Thomas Hart Benton.

== Early life ==
Lucas was born in Pittsburgh and moved with his father John Baptiste Charles Lucas to St. Louis, in 1805. He received a college degree from Jefferson College in 1810.

Lucas engaged in considerable land speculation including buying much of the land in the wake of the New Madrid earthquake in 1811. He also received a large land grant in Normandy in what is now suburban St. Louis.

He was the law partner to Rufus Easton in St. Louis and St. Charles and remained in this position until he was killed in a duel. He joined a volunteer Army unit in the War of 1812.

After the war he served on the Legislature of the Missouri Territory.

== Duel and death ==
In August 1817 Lucas and Benton as attorneys were opposite sides of a court case and accused each other of lying. When they encountered each other again in an August 1817 election, the 24-year-old Lucas challenged whether 35-year-old Benton owned property and could legally vote. Benton replied that he owned slaves and paid taxes on them and could vote and then called Lucas according to one version an "insolent puppy." Another slightly different witness account said Benton told the judges, "Gentlemen, if you have any questions to ask, I am prepared to answer, but I do not propose to answer charges made by any puppy who may happen to run across my path."

Lucas then challenged Benton on August 11 to a duel with a note, "I am informed you applied to me on the day of the election the epithet of 'Puppy.' If so I shall expect that satisfaction which is due from one gentleman to another for such an indignity." The challenge arrived to Benton after he had spent the night at the wake of his dead friend Edward Hempstead. Benton accepted but said that he wanted to complete the funeral. The terms of the duel called for it to be held at 6 a.m. and the shots to be fired from 30 feet.

The two met on August 12, 1817, on Bloody Island. Lucas was shot in the neck and Benton was shot below the right knee. Lucas was unable to continue, and Benton subsequently released Lucas from an obligation to continue the duel.

Rumors circulated questioning Benton's motives and whether Benton had deliberately set the duel rules so they were farther apart. On September 23 Benton challenged Lucas to a rematch, saying "When I released you from your engagement to return to the island, I yielded to a feeling of generosity in my own bosom, and to a sentiment of deference to the judgment of others. From the reports which now fill the country it would seem that yourself and some of your friends have placed my conduct to very different motives. The object of this is to bring these calumnies to an end, and to give you an opportunity of justifying the great expectation which has been excited. Colonel Lawless will receive your terms, and I expect your distance not to exceed nine feet."

Lucas who had been in Cape Girardeau received the note on September 26 and agreed to the duel on September 27 on Bloody Island. He died within an hour after being shot. Benton extended his hand to Lucas and Lucas replied "I forgive you." Lucas' second for both duels was Joshua Barton, who would later also die in a duel on the island.

He was buried in Calvary Cemetery in St. Louis.

Four of Lucas' brothers were to die violently. Lucas' land went to a brother, James Hunt Lucas, and a sister; much of the Normany land would wind up in the hands of explorer Wilson Price Hunt.
