= Joshua Barton =

American politician (1792–1823)

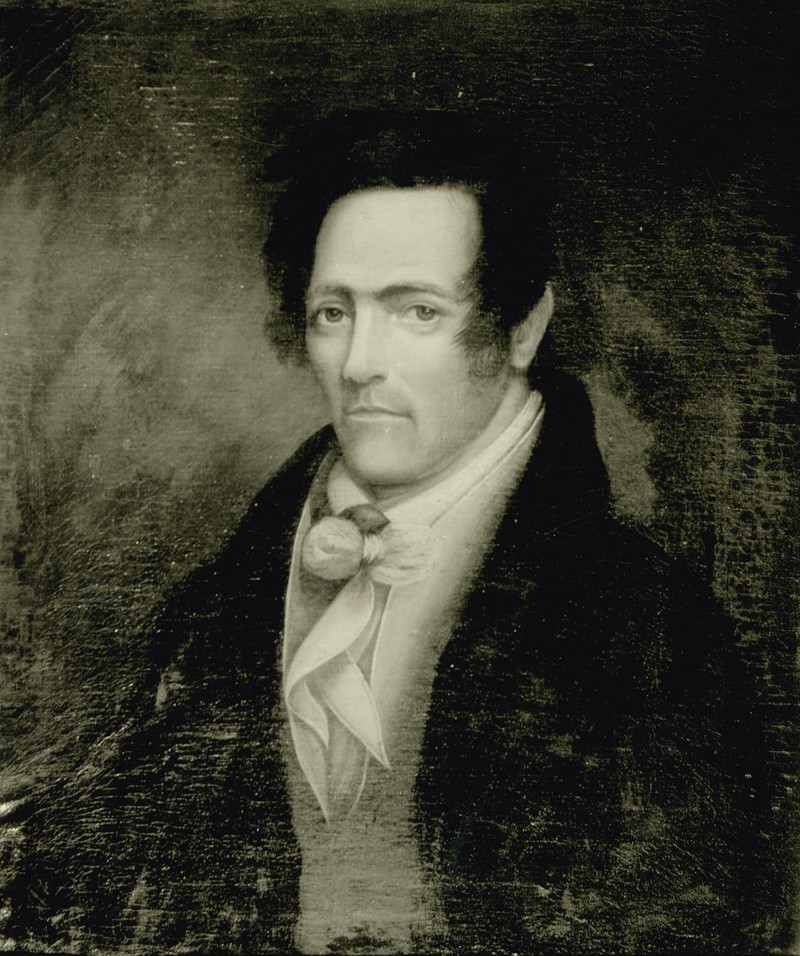
- Barton, early 19th century painting (photographed)

1st Missouri Secretary of State
- In office 1820–1821

Joshua Barton (July 28, 1792 – June 30, 1823) was the first Missouri Secretary of State. He was involved in three duels with prominent Missouri politicians before being killed in a duel.

Barton, a younger brother of Senator David Barton, was born in Jefferson County, Tennessee.

He moved to St. Louis, Missouri in 1809. He studied law under Rufus Easton, who was Missouri Territory's second representative to Congress. After being admitted to the bar, he and Edward Bates, Missouri's first attorney general, formed a law firm.

Barton was the first Secretary of State, but resigned to become district attorney of St. Louis, Missouri.

== Duelist ==
In 1816, he fought a duel with Thomas Hempstead, brother of Edward Hempstead, Missouri's first representative to Congress. Bates was his second. Thomas Hart Benton was Hempstead's second. The duel ended in no bloodshed.

In 1817, he was second to Charles Lucas in two duels with Benton. After having been wounded the first time, Lucas was killed during the second duel.

In 1823, David Barton opposed the reappointment of William Rector as Surveyor General for Missouri, Illinois and Arkansas, saying that Rector was hiring his relatives as surveyors and overpaying his surveyors. Rector had overseen the surveying the Louisiana Purchase, including the establishment of the Beginning Point of the Louisiana Purchase Survey. William Rector had previously been hired to survey the location route of the Buffalo Trace before an Indian treaty line was established.

Joshua Barton made the charges in a letter signed "Philo" to the weekly newspaper the St. Louis Republican. Rector's brother, Thomas Rector, contacted the paper and found out that Barton had written the letter and challenged him to a duel. They met at 6 p.m. on June 30, 1823, on Bloody Island (where the previous duels had occurred). Barton was killed instantly, while Thomas Rector was not hurt. Rector died in 1825 in a knife fight in St. Louis. President James Monroe did not reappoint William Rector.

Political offices
Preceded by None	Missouri Secretary of State; 1820–1821	Succeeded by William Grymes Pettus
