= Normandy, Missouri =

- City
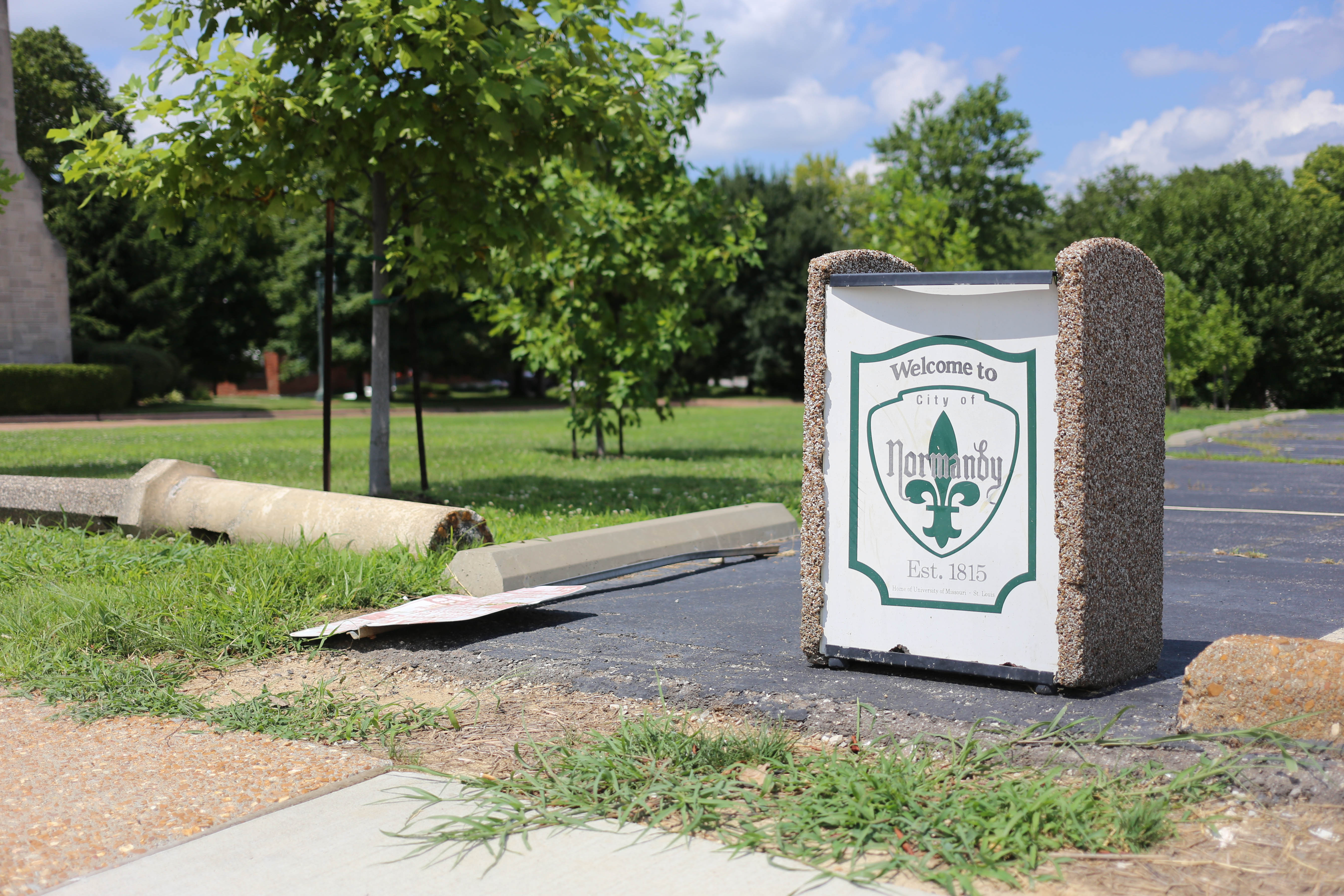
- Welcome sign for Normandy, Missouri, July 2016

- Location of Normandy, Missouri

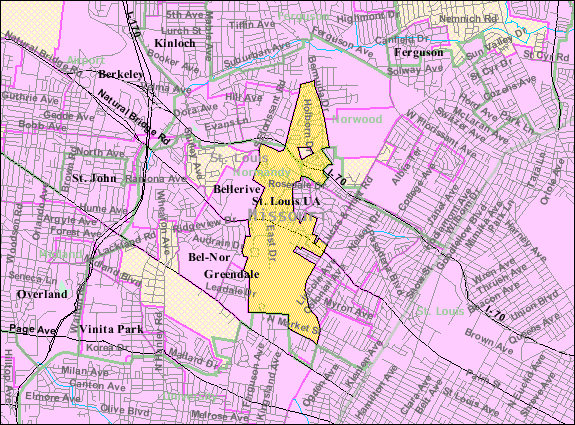
- U.S. Census Map
- Coordinates: 38°42′26″N 90°18′03″W
- Country: United States
- State: Missouri
- County: St. Louis

Area
  - Total: 1.85 sq mi (4.80 km^{2})
  - Land: 1.85 sq mi (4.80 km^{2})
  - Water: 0 sq mi (0.00 km^{2})
- Elevation: 659 ft (201 m)

Population (2020)
  - Total: 4,287
  - Density: 2,313.2/sq mi (893.14/km^{2})
- Time zone: UTC-6 (Central (CST))
  - Summer (DST): UTC-5 (CDT)
- FIPS code: 29-52796
- GNIS feature ID: 2395249
- Website: www.cityofnormandy.gov

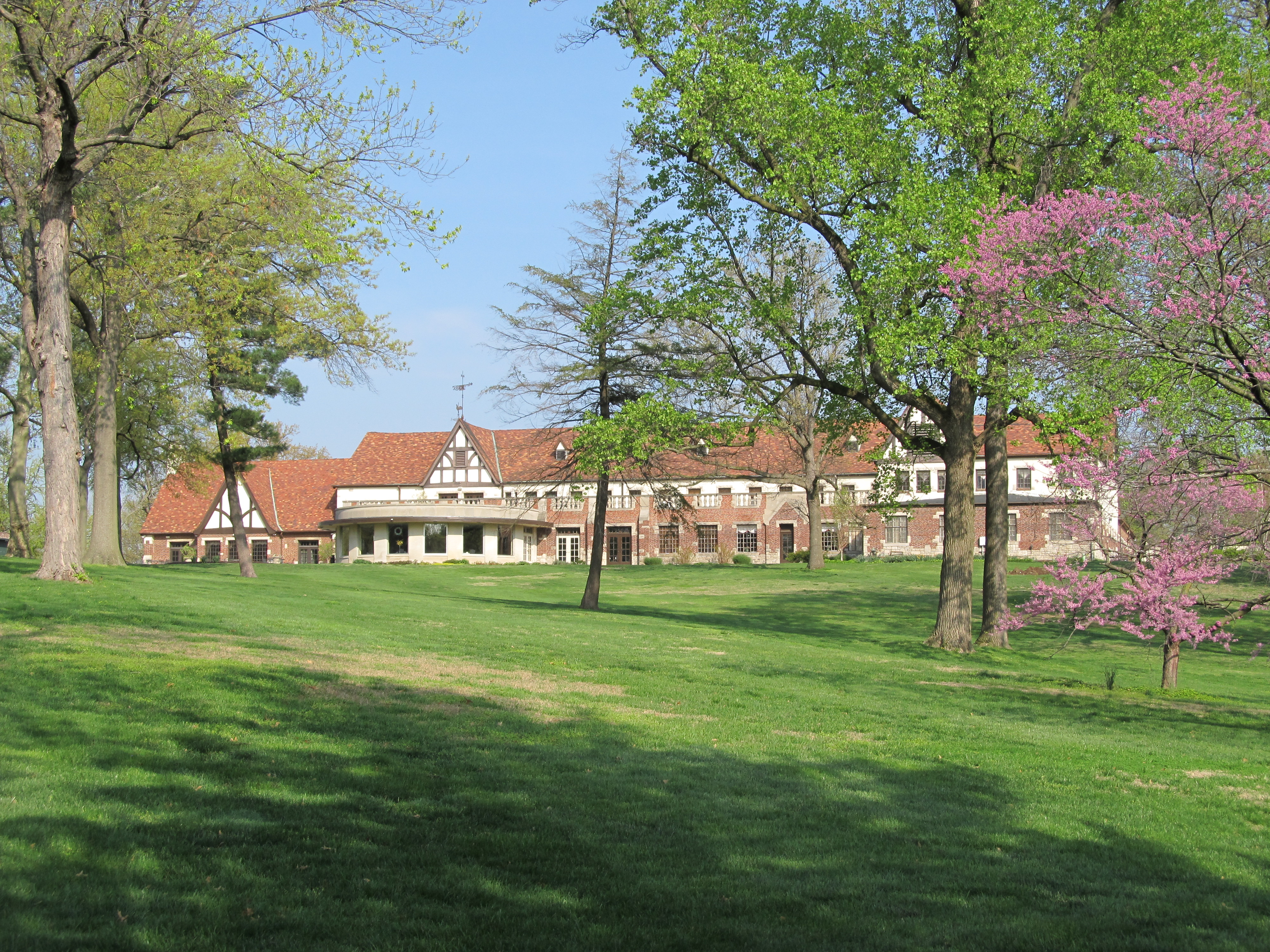
Glen Echo Country Club, the site of the 1904 Olympics golf tournament and host of a later LPGA tournament

Normandy is a city in St. Louis County, Missouri, United States. The population was 4,287 at the 2020 census.

== History ==
The city of Normandy is on land once owned by Charles Lucas. Lucas obtained property from the federal government with land grants, and he purchased the land from victims of the New Madrid earthquake of 1811. He named it for the French coastal region of Normandy from which his father John Baptiste Charles Lucas came. The site of his home is now on the property of Incarnate Word Academy.

Lucas was to fight two duels on Bloody Island with Thomas Hart Benton, and died in the 1817 duel.

Upon Charles' death, and that of his father, Federal Land Grant Judge J.B.C. Lucas, his land was left to his sister Anne and brother James. Anne married Capt. Theodore Hunt, son of the Patriot Abraham Hunt of Trenton, New Jersey, who died in 1832. In 1836, she married Theodore's first cousin, the explorer Wilson Price Hunt. The Hunt home at 7717 Natural Bridge Rd. was completed in 1908 after the current site of Glen Echo Club (the old Hunt Estate) was leased to the Golf Club in 1898 and later sold to the club. It was used for several years as the convent of the Sisters of the Cenacle before being taken over by the Normandy School District.

Normandy incorporated in May 1945.

In 1960, the Normandy School District approved a bond issue to buy the Bellerive Country Club to form a junior college. In 1963, the Normandy Residence Center became the University of Missouri–St. Louis; the university is partially within the City of Normandy.

In May 1977, Normandy annexed Berdell Hills.

In August 2023, Normandy and the Village of Glen Echo Park voted to consolidate municipalities. The consolidation took effect on February 8, 2024.

== Geography ==
According to the United States Census Bureau, the city has a total area of 1.85 square miles (4.79 km^{2}), all land.

== Demographics ==
Historical population
Census	Pop.	Note	%±
1880	199		—
1950	2,306		—
1960	4,452		93.1%
1970	6,236		40.1%
1980	5,174		−17.0%
1990	4,480		−13.4%
2000	5,153		15.0%
2010	5,008		−2.8%
2020	4,287		−14.4%
U.S. Decennial Census

=== Racial and ethnic composition ===
Normandy, Missouri – Racial and ethnic composition Note: the US Census treats Hispanic/Latino as an ethnic category. This table excludes Latinos from the racial categories and assigns them to a separate category. Hispanics/Latinos may be of any race.
Race / Ethnicity (NH = Non-Hispanic)	Pop 2000	Pop 2010	Pop 2020	% 2000	% 2010	% 2020
White alone (NH)	1,355	1,059	758	26.30%	21.15%	17.68%
Black or African American alone (NH)	3,422	3,475	3,010	66.41%	69.39%	70.21%
Native American or Alaska Native alone (NH)	13	14	10	0.25%	0.28%	0.23%
Asian alone (NH)	164	281	243	3.18%	5.61%	5.67%
Native Hawaiian or Pacific Islander alone (NH)	3	0	0	0.06%	0.00%	0.00%
Other race alone (NH)	9	6	24	0.17%	0.12%	0.56%
Mixed race or Multiracial (NH)	121	95	125	2.35%	1.90%	2.92%
Hispanic or Latino (any race)	66	78	117	1.28%	1.56%	2.73%
Total	5,153	5,008	4,287	100.00%	100.00%	100.00%

=== 2020 census ===
As of the 2020 census, Normandy had a population of 4,287. The median age was 29.0 years. 19.3% of residents were under the age of 18 and 11.9% of residents were 65 years of age or older. For every 100 females there were 79.7 males, and for every 100 females age 18 and over there were 72.7 males age 18 and over.

100.0% of residents lived in urban areas, while 0.0% lived in rural areas.

There were 1,772 households in Normandy, of which 24.9% had children under the age of 18 living in them. Of all households, 16.3% were married-couple households, 27.4% were households with a male householder and no spouse or partner present, and 51.1% were households with a female householder and no spouse or partner present. About 42.2% of all households were made up of individuals and 10.3% had someone living alone who was 65 years of age or older.

There were 2,598 housing units, of which 31.8% were vacant. The homeowner vacancy rate was 2.9% and the rental vacancy rate was 21.6%.

=== 2010 census ===
As of the census of 2010, there were 5,008 people, 1,942 households, and 1,023 families living in the city. The population density was 2,707.0 inhabitants per square mile (1,045.2/km^{2}). There were 2,240 housing units at an average density of 1,210.8 per square mile (467.5/km^{2}). The racial makeup of the city was 21.3% White, 69.7% African American, 0.3% Native American, 5.6% Asian, 0.9% from other races, and 2.1% from two or more races. Hispanic or Latino of any race were 1.6% of the population.

There were 1,942 households, of which 31.3% had children under the age of 18 living with them, 20.4% were married couples living together, 27.7% had a female householder with no husband present, 4.6% had a male householder with no wife present, and 47.3% were non-families. 33.6% of all households were made up of individuals, and 4.9% had someone living alone who was 65 years of age or older. The average household size was 2.34 and the average family size was 3.06.

The median age in the city was 26 years. 23% of residents were under the age of 18; 24.7% were between the ages of 18 and 24; 22.9% were from 25 to 44; 21.8% were from 45 to 64; and 7.7% were 65 years of age or older. The gender makeup of the city was 45.8% male and 54.2% female.

=== 2000 census ===
As of the census of 2000, there were 5,153 people, 2,166 households, and 1,163 families living in the city. The population density was 2,826.3 inhabitants per square mile (1,091.2/km^{2}). There were 2,316 housing units at an average density of 1,270.3 per square mile (490.5/km^{2}). The racial makeup of the city was 26.82% White, 66.68% African American, 0.25% Native American, 3.18% Asian, 0.06% Pacific Islander, 0.47% from other races, and 2.54% from two or more races. Hispanic or Latino of any race were 1.28% of the population.

There were 2,166 households, out of which 30.4% had children under the age of 18 living with them, 23.9% were married couples living together, 24.7% had a female householder with no husband present, and 46.3% were non-families. 34.4% of all households were made up of individuals, and 5.5% had someone living alone who was 65 years of age or older. The average household size was 2.32 and the average family size was 3.02.

In the city, the population was spread out, with 26.0% under the age of 18, 18.9% from 18 to 24, 29.3% from 25 to 44, 17.6% from 45 to 64, and 8.2% who were 65 years of age or older. The median age was 28 years. For every 100 females, there were 82.3 males. For every 100 females age 18 and over, there were 74.1 males.

The median income for a household in the city was $25,802, and the median income for a family was $31,628. Males had a median income of $29,333 versus $25,634 for females. The per capita income for the city was $14,399. About 17.3% of families and 24.1% of the population were below the poverty line, including 24.1% of those under age 18 and 18.6% of those age 65 or over.

== Education ==
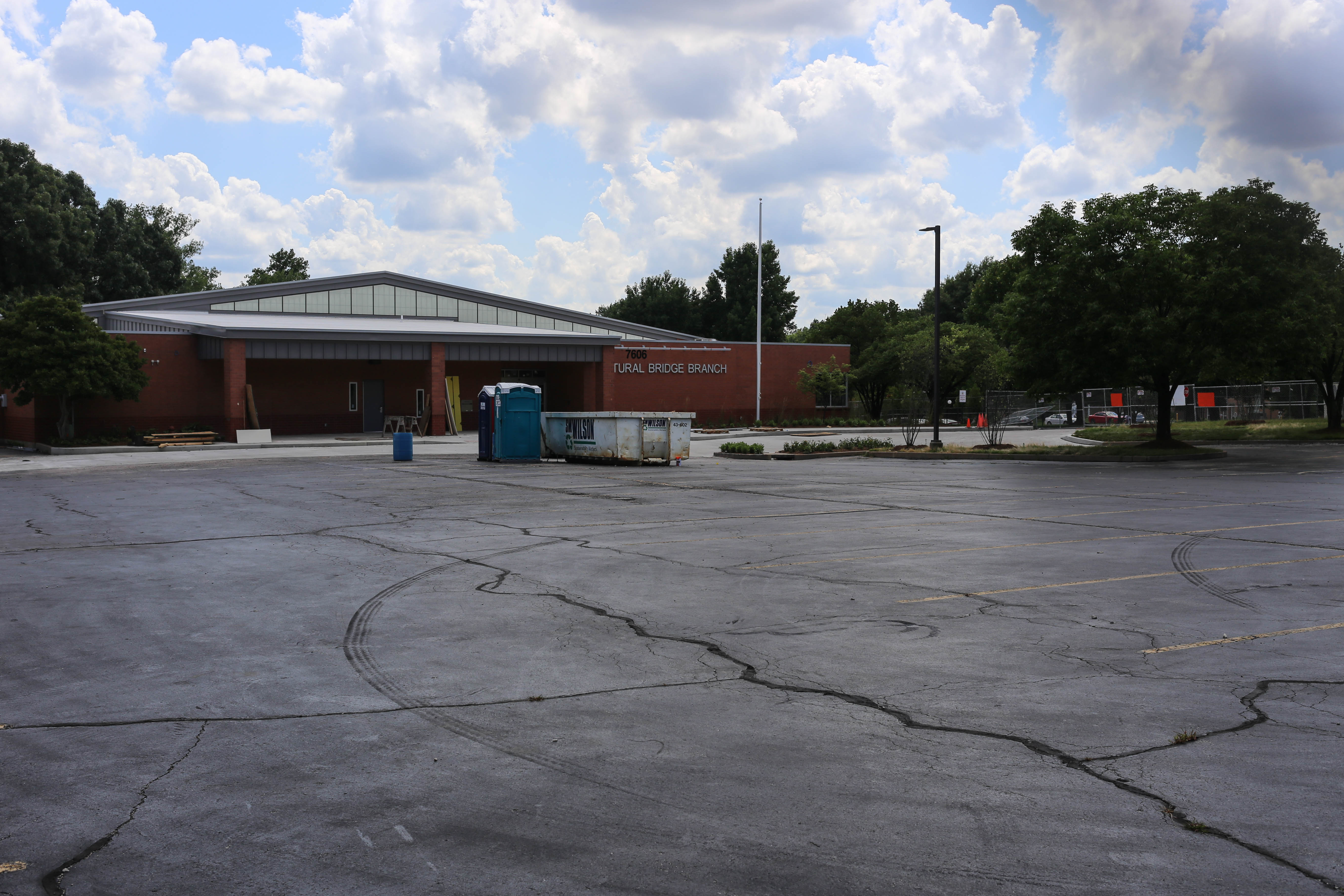
Natural Bridge Branch Library in Normandy

Normandy Schools Collaborative is the school district covering the majority of the municipality. A small portion is in the Ferguson-Florissant R-II School District. In July 2014, the Missouri State Board of Education established Normandy Schools Collaborative, formerly the Normandy School District. The Collaborative provides pre-Kindergarten and K-12 education for students in its territory. The school district headquarters is in the Normandy city limits. The Normandy Early Learning Center and Normandy Middle School at Lucas Crossing are in the Normandy city limits. The district's comprehensive high school is Normandy High School.

Normandy Middle School and Lucas Crossing Elementary School were formerly in the Normandy city limits. The Lucas Crossing complex opened in 2001. It took areas formerly assigned to Harrison, Lincoln, and McKinley elementary schools.

Private K-12 schooling is offered at St. Ann Catholic School, a part of the Roman Catholic Archdiocese of St. Louis. St. Ann also operates St. Ann Early Childhood Center.

The University of Missouri - St. Louis is a public university whose campus is partially located within Normandy.

The St. Louis County Library operates the Natural Bridge Branch in Normandy.

== Parks and recreation ==
Normandy's main park is the Robert Hoelzel Memorial Park. Other pocket parks that can be accessed throughout the municipality include:

- Belwood Park
- Parchester Park
- Tear Drop Park

== Police services ==
The Normandy Police Department provides police services to the surrounding communities of Bel-Ridge, Cool Valley, Bellerive Acres, Glen Echo Park, and Pasadena Park. Glen Echo Park was merged into the City of Normandy on February 8th, 2024, following a vote by residents of Glen Echo Park on the August 8th, 2023 following a local election.

== Public transportation ==
=== MetroLink ===
MetroLink services are available in Normandy at the UMSL South Station.

== Community and economic development ==
=== Great Streets projects ===
In 2014 Normandy approved a Great Streets initiative to redevelop the stretch of Natural Bridge Road between North Hanley and Lucas and Hunt Roads. Construction began in June of that year and was completed in May 2016. Other street revitalization projects in Normandy apart from this initiative included improving the Teardrop and Belwood parks.

== Notable person ==
- Jon Hamm, actor
