= Bloody Island =

Bloody Island may refer to:

- Bloody Island (Mississippi River), a former sandbar island in the Mississippi River oppose St. Louis, Missouri, now part of Illinois
- Bloody Island, a former island in Clear Lake in California
  - Bloody Island Massacre, an 1850 massacre, for which the California island is named, of Pomo Indians by the U.S. Army
- Gunther Island in Humboldt County, California, site of an 1860 massacre of Indians
