= Ste. Genevieve Memorial Cemetery =

Historic cemetery in Ste. Genevieve County, Missouri, US

- Memorial Cemetery
- U.S. National Historic Landmark District – Contributing property
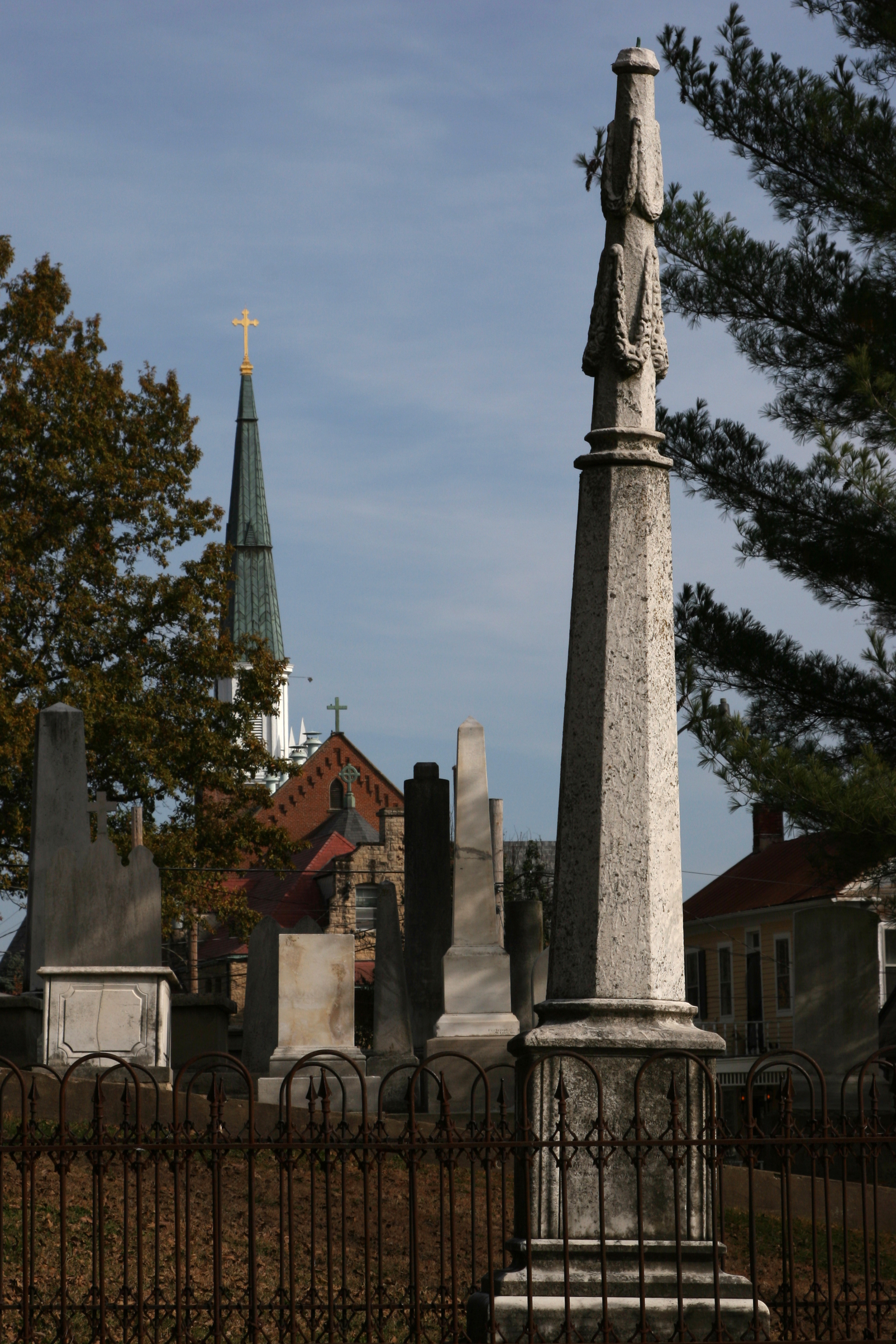
- Location: 5th & Merchant Sts, Ste. Genevieve, Missouri, United States
- Coordinates: 37°58′46″N 90°02′59″W
- Built: 1787
- Architectural style: French Colonial
- Part of: Ste. Genevieve Historic District (ID66000892)

Significant dates
- Added to NRHP: October 9, 1960
- Designated NHLDCP: October 15, 1966

Ste. Genevieve Memorial Cemetery in Ste. Genevieve, Missouri, United States is a contributing site to both the Ste. Genevieve Historic District, and the associated National Landmark District.

== History ==
Opened in 1787, Ste. Genevieve's oldest cemetery is divided into three sections: one for Catholic burials, one for Lutherans and a third for other Protestants. More than 50 Native Americans are buried there as well as an unknown number of African Americans, slave and free. It is also the final resting place for such notables as US Senator Lewis F. Linn, Felix and Odile Pratte-Vallé, and many other Missouri pioneers.

Over 5,000 burials occurred in this small, two-block cemetery. The cemetery was closed in 1881, though some additional burials occurred through 1894. Local records show that almost half of those interred were children under six years old.

Notable burials include Lewis F. Linn (1796–1843), physician and US Senator, and John Scott (1782–1861), US Representative.

== Preservation ==
Restoration was performed in the 2010s by the Foundation for Restoration of Ste. Genevieve, Inc.

The cemetery became of part of the National Historic Landmark District in 1960, and the National Register of Historic Places historic district in 1966.
