= Alexander Buckner =

American politician (1785–1833)

United States Senator from Missouri
- In office March 4, 1831 – June 6, 1833
- Preceded by: David Barton
- Succeeded by: Lewis F. Linn

Member of the Missouri Senate
- In office 1822–1826

Personal details
- Born: March 8, 1785 Jefferson County, Kentucky
- Died: June 6, 1833 (aged 48) Cape Girardeau County, Missouri
- Party: Jacksonian

Alexander Buckner (March 8, 1785 – June 6, 1833) was a United States senator from Missouri.

== Biography ==
Born in Jefferson County, Kentucky, he studied law and moved to Charlestown, Indiana in 1812. He moved to Missouri in 1818 and settled near Jackson; he practiced law and also engaged in agricultural pursuits. He was appointed by the Territorial Governor as circuit attorney for the Cape Girardeau district, and was president of the State constitutional convention in 1820. He was a member of the Missouri Senate from 1822 to 1826 and was elected to the U.S. Senate, serving from March 4, 1831, until his death due to cholera in Cape Girardeau County, 1833. Interment was on his farm in Cape Girardeau County; reinterment was in City Cemetery, Cape Girardeau, in 1897.

Buckner was instrumental in its founding of the Grand Lodge of Indiana and served as the first Grand Master of Masons in 1818.

== See also ==
- List of members of the United States Congress who died in office (1790–1899)

U.S. Senate
Preceded by David Barton	U.S. senator (Class 3) from Missouri; 1831–1833; Served alongside: Thomas H. Benton	Succeeded by Lewis F. Linn
