= David Barton (politician) =

American politician (1783–1837)

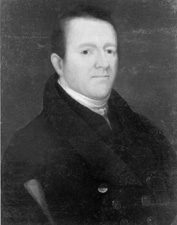

United States Senator from Missouri
- In office August 10, 1821 – March 3, 1831
- Preceded by: (none)
- Succeeded by: Alexander Buckner

Personal details
- Born: December 14, 1783 Greeneville, North Carolina, United States (now Tennessee)
- Died: September 28, 1837 (aged 53) Boonville, Missouri, United States
- Party: Democratic-Republican

David Barton (December 14, 1783 – September 28, 1837) was one of the first U.S. senators from Missouri, serving from 1821 to 1831.

Barton was born near Greeneville, Tennessee, then part of North Carolina. He moved to St. Louis in 1809. In 1812, he joined Nathan Boone's company of mounted rangers. Later stints with the rangers helped to make Barton popular in the region.

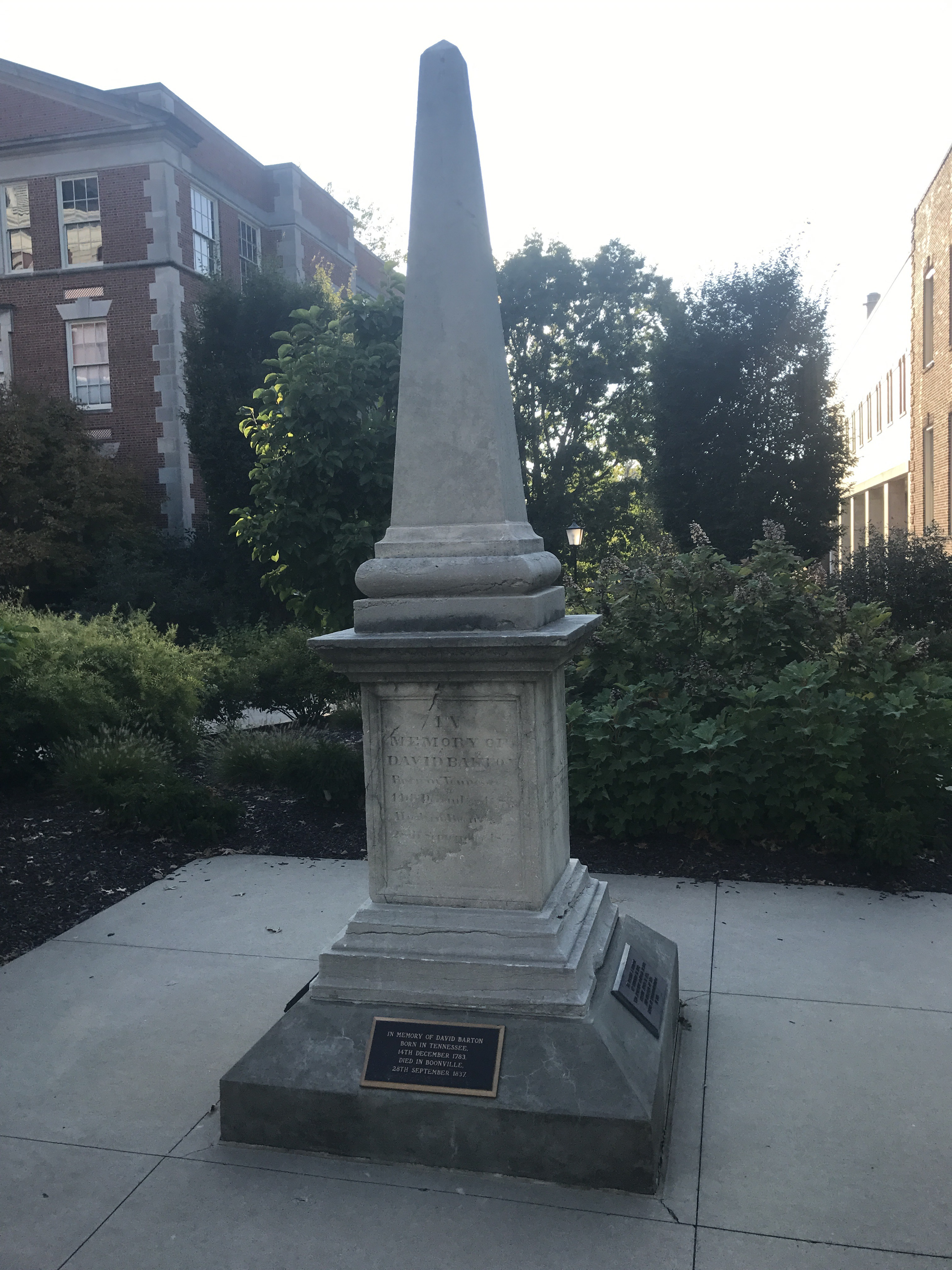
Memorial marker on Francis Quadrangle at the University of Missouri

He became a major political presence in early Missouri, serving as attorney general, president of the state's constitutional convention, speaker of the Missouri territorial House of Representatives, and as one of its first pair of U.S. senators. Barton County, Missouri is named for him.

He was the brother of Joshua Barton, the first Missouri Secretary of State. David opposed the reappointment of William Rector to the Office of Surveyor General for Missouri, Illinois and Arkansas, saying that Rector was using his relatives for surveying positions and paying them too much while Rector was surveying the Louisiana Purchase. Joshua published the charges in the St. Louis Republican under the signature of "Philo." Rector's brother Thomas Rector challenged Joshua to a duel in 1823 on Bloody Island (Mississippi River) and killed Joshua. President James Monroe did not reappoint Rector.

Barton switched parties three times in his political life. He was first elected as a Democratic-Republican; he then switched to an Adams Democrat for his re-election in 1825. When he ran for the Senate again in 1830 he switched to being an Anti-Jacksonian candidate. In the Senate, he served as chairman of the committee on public lands. His second term expired March 3, 1831. He was a member of the Missouri State Senate in 1834–1835.

He died at Boonville, Missouri, September 28, 1837.

U.S. Senate
Preceded by None	U.S. senator (Class 3) from Missouri; 1821–1831; Served alongside: Thomas H. Benton	Succeeded by Alexander Buckner
