= John Baptiste Charles Lucas =

American judge (1758–1842)

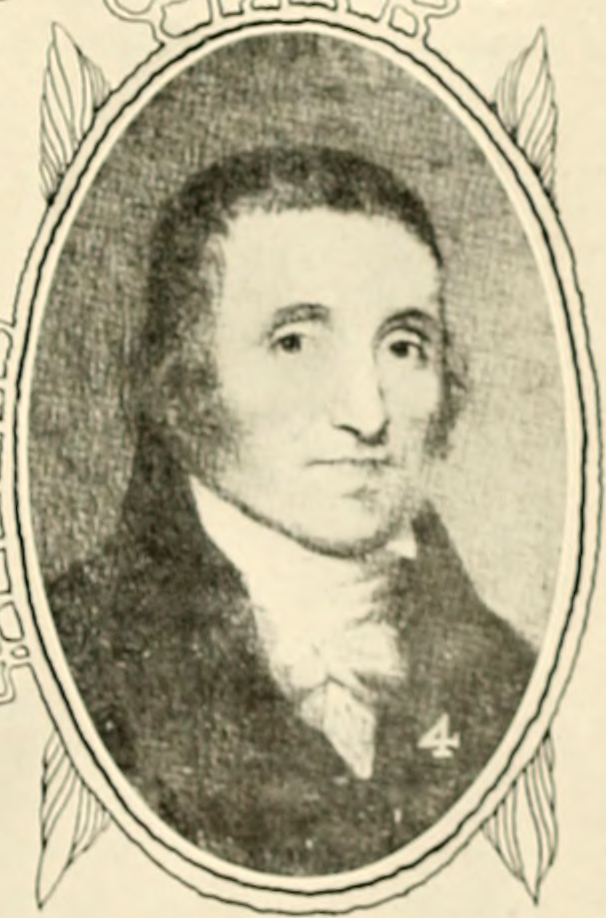

John Baptiste Charles Lucas (August 14, 1758 – August 17, 1842) was a French-born member of the U.S. House of Representatives from Pennsylvania. After meeting Benjamin Franklin, Lucas was so inspired—and so impatient with class injustices in France—that he sailed to America. Armed with a letter of introduction from Franklin, Lucas was made a federal land grant judge by Thomas Jefferson, then elected to the U.S. House of Representatives. He eventually resigned and moved to St. Louis, reportedly in part because he and his wife, Anne, missed French society.

== Biography ==
Lucas was born in Pont-Audemer, Normandy, France. He attended the Honfleur and Paris Law Schools, and graduated from the law department of the University of Caen in 1782. He practiced law in France until 1784, when he immigrated to the United States and settled near Pittsburgh, Pennsylvania. He engaged in agricultural pursuits.

Lucas was a member of the Pennsylvania House of Representatives from 1792 to 1798. He served as judge of the Court of Common Pleas in 1794.

In the early 1800s, newly-elected President Thomas Jefferson appointed Lucas to a secret mission to St. Louis and New Orleans. Lucas reported directly to the president on the sentiments of the Spaniards in those cities toward the United States, in preparation for Jefferson's efforts at westward expansion.

With strong support from President Jefferson, Lucas was elected as a Republican to the Eighth and Ninth Congresses and served until his resignation in 1805, before the assembling of the Ninth Congress. He moved to St. Louis, having received a recess appointment from Jefferson as a judge of the northern district of the Louisiana Territory (which became Missouri Territory in 1812), which was confirmed by the Senate by a vote of 16 to 15 on January 27, 1806. He served from 1805 until 1820, when he resigned. He also served as commissioner of land claims of northern Louisiana from 1805 to 1812. He then resumed agricultural pursuits.

While in Missouri, Lucas donated land in downtown St. Louis in 1816 for a courthouse (known as the Old St. Louis County Courthouse) that is now part of the Gateway Arch National Park. (In 1930, the courthouse was abandoned after court functions moved to larger quarters; his descendants fought unsuccessfully to get the courthouse back.) Today, the Gateway Arch frames the view of the courthouse from the Mississippi River.

Lucas died near St. Louis in 1842, and was buried at Calvary Cemetery. His business operations were taken over, in part, by his son James Hunt Lucas. Five of Lucas' other sons were to die violently, including Charles Lucas, who was killed in a duel with Senator Thomas Hart Benton. A grandson, Henry Van Noye Lucas, owned a major league baseball franchise in St. Louis in the late 19th century.

== Sources ==
- United States Congress. "John Baptiste Charles Lucas (id: L000492)". Biographical Directory of the United States Congress.
- The Political Graveyard

U.S. House of Representatives
Preceded by John Smilie	Member of the U.S. House of Representatives from Pennsylvania's 11th congressional district 1803–1805	Succeeded by Samuel Smith
