= Lewis F. Linn =

American politician

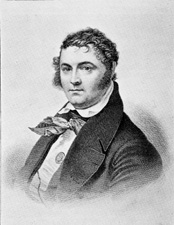

United States Senator from Missouri
- In office October 25, 1833 – October 3, 1843
- Preceded by: Alexander Buckner
- Succeeded by: David R. Atchison

Member of the Missouri Senate
- In office 1827

Personal details
- Born: Lewis Fields Linn; November 5, 1796 Louisville, Kentucky
- Died: October 3, 1843 (aged 46) Ste. Genevieve, Missouri
- Party: Democratic
- Education: University of Pennsylvania

Lewis Fields Linn (November 5, 1796 – October 3, 1843) was a medical doctor and politician who represented his home state of Missouri in the United States Senate from 1833 to his death.

== Early life ==
Linn was born near Louisville, Kentucky, on November 5, 1796. He received a meager academic education because of the deaths of his parents. He was raised by his older half-brother, Henry Dodge and began studying medicine in Louisville. During the War of 1812 he served as a surgeon with troops commanded by Henry Dodge, though he was still a teenager; after the war he completed his studies at Philadelphia Medical College in 1816. Linn is among the hundreds of members of Congress who were slaveowners.

== Career ==
Linn was admitted to practice as a medical doctor and subsequently relocated to Ste. Genevieve, Missouri. Early in his career he earned recognition for his major role in combating two cholera epidemics.

He served in the Missouri Senate in 1827. In 1832 he was appointed to the state commission which settled land claims based on grants made by the government of France prior to the Missouri Territory becoming part of the United States.

In 1833 Linn was elected to the United States Senate as a Jacksonian, filling the vacancy created by the death of Alexander Buckner. He was re-elected as a Democrat in 1836 and 1842, and served from October 25, 1833, until his death. During his Senate career Linn was chairman of the Committee on Private Land Claims from 1835 to 1841 (Twenty-fourth through Twenty-sixth Congresses), and the Committee on Agriculture from 1841 to 1843 (Twenty-seventh Congress).

== Death and burial ==
Linn died in Ste. Genevieve, Missouri on October 3, 1843. He was buried at Ste. Genevieve Memorial Cemetery.

== Legacy ==
Four states have counties named after him: Iowa, Kansas, Missouri, and Oregon.

The towns of Linneus, Missouri, Linn, Missouri, West Linn, Oregon, and Linnton, Oregon, were also named in Linn's honor.

== Family ==
Linn was the brother-in-law of James Hugh Relfe, half-brother of Henry Dodge and uncle of Henry's son Augustus C. Dodge. He was the uncle of William Pope McArthur, a United States Navy officer who was notable for his surveys of the Pacific Coast.

== See also ==
- List of members of the United States Congress who died in office (1790–1899)

U.S. Senate
Preceded by Alexander Buckner	U.S. senator (Class 3) from Missouri; 1833–1843; Served alongside: Thomas H. Benton	Succeeded by David R. Atchison
