= James Hunt Lucas =

American businessman and politician (1835–1919)

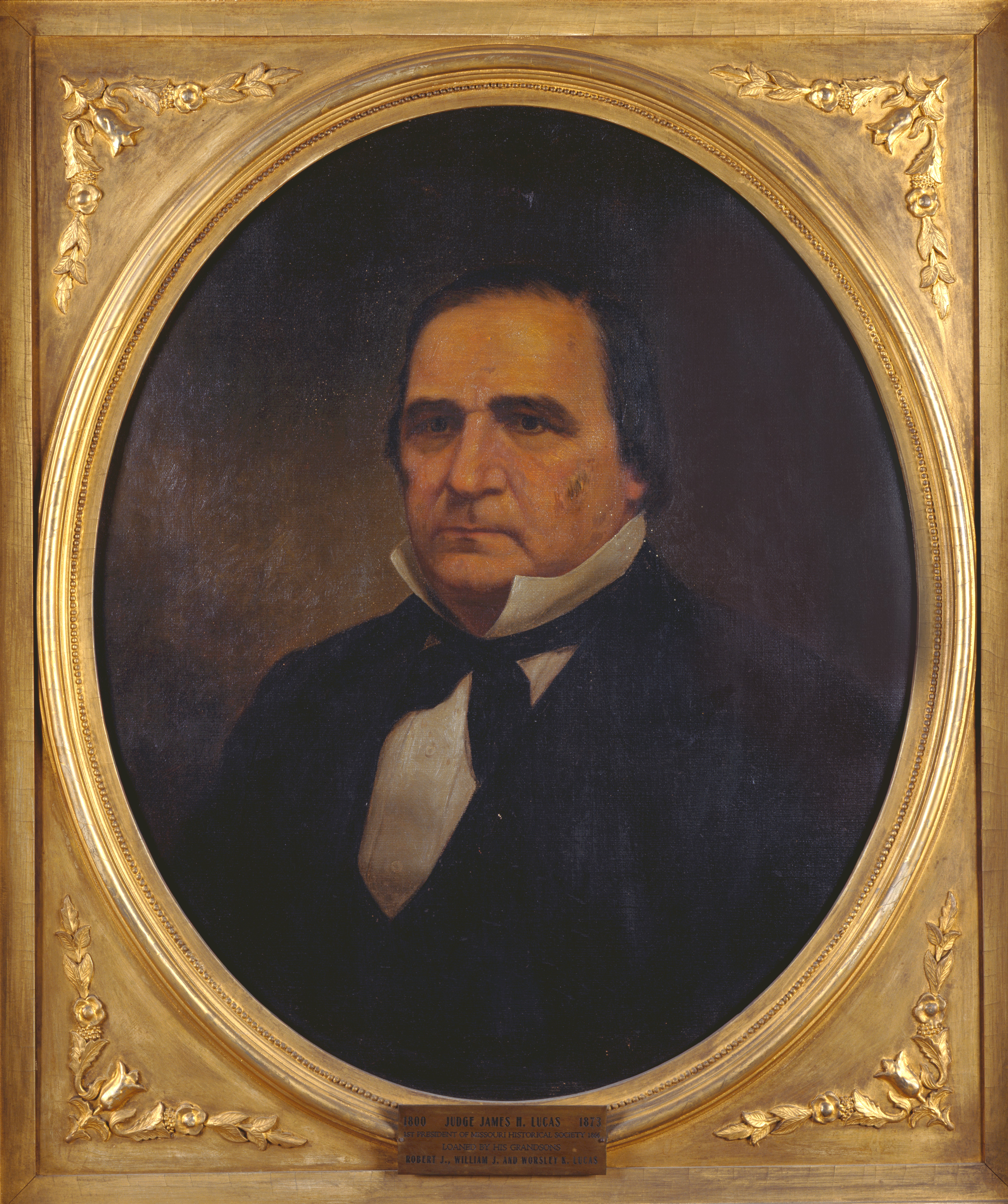
- Painted by J. Reid in 1877
- Born: 1800; Pennsylvania
- Died: 1873 (aged 72–73); St. Louis, Missouri, U.S.
- Occupations: Businessman, politician, philanthropist
- Parent(s): John Baptiste Charles Lucas, Anne Sebin Lucas

James Hunt Lucas (1800 – 1873), was an investor, lawyer, civic leader, slaveholder, and entrepreneur based in Saint Louis, Missouri.

Lucas was born in 1800 to John Baptiste Charles Lucas and Anne Sebin Lucas. His father was a native of France who had settled near Pittsburgh, Pennsylvania. A lawyer by training and farmer by trade, the elder Lucas served two terms as a member of the U.S. House of Representatives. The family moved to St. Louis in 1805, when President Thomas Jefferson appointed John Lucas a federal judge there.

James Lucas attended the College of St. Thomas, in Nelson County, Kentucky, then studied law in New York state. He married, practiced law, and worked as a typesetter for the Arkansas Gazette in Little Rock, Arkansas. In 1842, he heeded his father's call to return to St. Louis, and settled north of the city in the town of Normandy on "The Farm", his father's 50-acre family plantation, valued at $30,000 ($861,400 today).

Five years later, he took over the management of his father's extensive estate and business operations. His inheritance turned Lucas into one of St. Louis's wealthy elite. He served as a Missouri state senator from 1834 to 1845.

He invested $100,000 in the nascent Missouri Pacific Railroad and was twice elected its president. He helped found the Laclede Gas Company and also served as its president. His real estate holdings ultimately included 225 stores and dwellings in St. Louis.

Lucas died on November 11, 1873.
