= Bloody Island (Mississippi River) =

Former island in Illinois, United States

- 1853 Map of Bloody Island towhead
- Interactive map of Bloody Island

Geography
- Location: Mississippi River, East St. Louis, Illinois
- Coordinates: 38°38′18″N 90°10′26″W

Administration
- United States

Additional information
- The neutral ground, between Illinois and Missouri, of many notorious duels in the 19th century, including Thomas Hart Benton and Charles Lucas. It’s also in St. Clair County in Illinois.

Notable Bloody Island duelists
- Duration: 1817-1856
- Location: Bloody Island Dueling Grounds
- Participants: Thomas Hart Benton vs. Charles Lucas (fought two duels in 1817) Joshua Barton vs. Thomas C. Rector (1823) Thomas Biddle vs. Spencer Darwin Pettis (1831) Benjamin Gratz Brown vs. Thomas C. Reynolds (1856)
- Casualties: Thomas Hart Benton and Charles Lucas, both wounded in first duel; Charles Lucas, killed in second duel; Joshua Barton, killed; Thomas Biddle vs. Spencer Darwin Pettis, both killed; Benjamin Gratz Brown, wounded

Bloody Island was a sandbar or "towhead" (river island) in the Mississippi River, opposite St. Louis, Missouri, which became densely wooded and a rendezvous for duelists because it was considered "neutral" and not under Missouri or Illinois control.

== History ==
After its first appearance above water in 1798, its continuous growth menaced the harbor of St. Louis. In 1837 Capt. Robert E. Lee, of U.S. Army Engineers, devised and established a system of dikes and dams that washed out the western channel and ultimately joined the island to the Illinois shore. In 1846 as the Miami people were being forcibly removed westward from their traditional homelands; the group stopped on Bloody Island. According to Miami oral history, the group buried an infant and elderly member of the tribe on or near the island.

The south end of the island is now under the Poplar Street Bridge at the site of a train yard. Samuel Wiggins bought 800 acres (3.2 km^{2}) around the island in the early 19th century and operated a ferry between East St. Louis and St. Louis (at one point using an 8-horse team on the ferry to provide the propulsion). The Wiggins Ferry Service would develop the train yards which in the 1870s carted train cars across the river one at a time until the Eads Bridge opened in 1879. The train yard is now owned by the Terminal Railroad Association of St. Louis.

== Notable duels ==
- Thomas Hart Benton and Charles Lucas (twice) in 1817 - Benton and Lucas were both attorneys and had taken opposing sides in a land dispute. In the midst of the trial, Benton insulted Lucas by calling him an outright liar. A few weeks later, during a local election, Lucas accused Benton of not having a right to vote because he had not paid his property tax. Benton responded to this accusation by calling Lucas a "little puppy" and a character of little significance. When Lucas was informed of Benton's insult, he challenged Benton to a duel. In the initial encounter Lucas was shot in the throat and Benton was grazed in the knee. Although both parties had achieved satisfaction under the dictates of the Code Duello, Benton demanded that they shoot again. Eventually, Benton was talked out of a second round, but when Lucas—having healed from his wound—started to change the story to support his character over Benton's, Benton challenged him to a second duel and summarily killed him.
- Joshua Barton and Thomas C. Rector - June 30, 1823 - Barton was the first Missouri Secretary of State, a St. Louis federal district attorney, and brother of Senator David Barton. He had been Lucas' second in Lucas's two duels with Thomas Hart Benton (see above). Senator Barton was critical of reappointing Rector's brother William Rector Surveyor General in regards to the survey of the Louisiana Purchase territory. Barton published the charges in the St. Louis Republican and was challenged by Rector to a duel. Barton was killed and Rector escaped unhurt. President James Madison would not reappoint Rector. Rector would die two years later in a knife fight.
- Thomas Biddle and Spencer Darwin Pettis — August 26, 1831 — One of the most famous duels to occur on Bloody Island, it is often cited as an example of the theory that "all politics is local." Pettis, a staunch Jacksonian Democrat, challenged Biddle, brother of banker Nicholas Biddle, because Biddle had publicly humiliated Pettis. Because the Code Duello stated that the particulars of the duel were to be decided by the "challenge," Biddle, who was nearsighted, chose Bloody Island and a distance of five feet. It is argued that Biddle thought such a close distance would convince Pettis not to go through with the duel, but Pettis was undeterred. They fired at five feet, and both were killed. Some 2,000 people reportedly had gathered on shore watch the planned spectacle.
- James Shields and Abraham Lincoln - September 22, 1842 - Abraham Lincoln had sent two letters to a Springfield IL newspaper, and in them he called Shields, the Illinois State Auditor, a liar and fool, and other terms, signing them 'Rebecca'. Mary Todd knew Lincoln had sent the letters, thought it great fun and wrote and sent more letters to the newspaper signed 'Rebecca'. Those additional letters angered Shields to the point of challenging Lincoln to a duel. As the person challenged Lincoln knew that the usual pistols would be fatal to him, so he stipulated broadswords at a distance no closer than 10 feet. Lincoln, the taller person, would have an advantage. They met and the seconds managed to persuade Shields to accept a vague apology from Lincoln. Shields would later serve as a General in the Mexican and Civil Wars.
- Benjamin Gratz Brown and Thomas C. Reynolds — August 26, 1856 — Brown at the time was editor of the St. Louis Democrat and Reynolds was United States Attorney in St. Louis. Reynolds, who opposed emancipation, challenged Brown, who favored it. Brown was shot in the leg and limped for the rest of his life; Reynolds was not hurt. The duel would later be called the "Duel of the Governors" because Reynolds would become the state's Confederate governor and Brown would be elected governor after the war.

== See also ==
- DeSoto Island
- Dueling Oaks

== Sources ==
- Dictionary of American History by James Truslow Adams, New York: Charles Scribner's Sons, 1940
- Crack of the Pistol: Dueling in 19th Century Missouri (Missouri State Archives)
- Mark Neels, "The Barbarous Custom of Dueling," in The Lindenwood Confluence (Fall, 2010).
