= Thomas Hart Benton (politician) =

American politician (1782–1858)

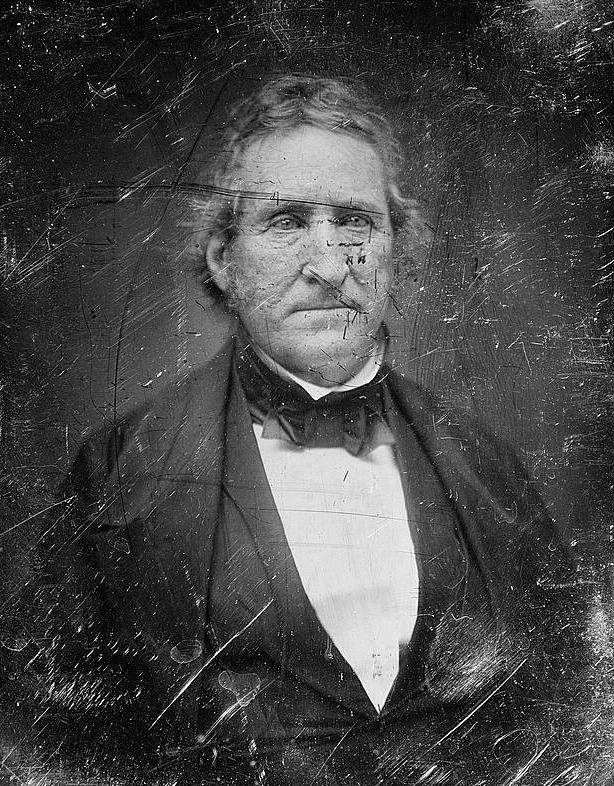

United States Senator from Missouri
- In office August 10, 1821 – March 3, 1851
- Preceded by: Seat established
- Succeeded by: Henry S. Geyer
Senate positions
Chair of the Senate Foreign Relations Committee
In office March 4, 1849 – March 23, 1849
Preceded by	Edward A. Hannegan
Succeeded by	William R. King
Chair of the Senate Military Affairs Committee
In office March 4, 1845 – March 4, 1849
Preceded by	John J. Crittenden
Succeeded by	Jefferson Davis
In office May 20, 1828 – March 4, 1841
Preceded by	William Henry Harrison
Succeeded by	William C. Preston
Chair of the Senate Indian Affairs Committee
In office March 4, 1823 – May 20, 1828
Preceded by	Henry Johnson
Succeeded by	Hugh Lawson White

Member of the U.S. House of Representatives from Missouri's 1st district
- In office March 4, 1853 – March 3, 1855
- Preceded by: John F. Darby
- Succeeded by: Luther M. Kennett

Personal details
- Born: March 14, 1782 Orange County, North Carolina, U.S.
- Died: April 10, 1858 (aged 76) Washington, D.C., U.S.
- Resting place: Bellefontaine Cemetery
- Party: Democratic-Republican (Before 1825); Democratic (1837–1858)
- Spouse: Elizabeth Preston McDowell
- Relatives: Jesse Benton Jr. (brother), Jessie Benton Frémont (daughter)
- Education: University of North Carolina at Chapel Hill
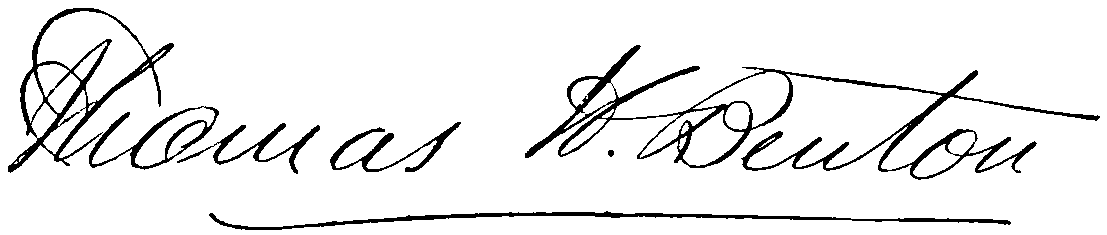
- Signature

Military service
- Allegiance: United States
- Branch/service: United States Army
- Years of service: 1812–1815
- Rank: Lieutenant Colonel

Thomas Hart Benton (March 14, 1782 – April 10, 1858), nicknamed "Old Bullion", was an American politician, attorney, soldier, and longtime United States senator from Missouri. A member of the Democratic Party, he was an architect and champion of westward expansion by the United States, a cause that became known as manifest destiny. Benton served in the Senate from 1821 to 1851, becoming the first member of that body to serve five terms.

He was born in North Carolina. After being expelled from the University of North Carolina in 1799 for theft, he established a law practice and plantation near Nashville, Tennessee. He served as an aide to General Andrew Jackson during the War of 1812 and settled in St. Louis, Missouri, after the war. Missouri became a state in 1821, and Benton won election as one of its inaugural pair of United States Senators. The Democratic-Republican Party fractured after 1824, and Benton became a Democratic leader in the Senate, serving as an important ally of President Jackson and President Martin Van Buren. He supported Jackson during the Bank War and proposed a land payment law that inspired Jackson's Specie Circular executive order.

Benton's prime concern was the westward expansion of the United States. He called for the annexation of the Republic of Texas, which was accomplished in 1845. He pushed for compromise in the partition of Oregon Country with the British and supported the 1846 Oregon Treaty, which divided the territory along the 49th parallel. He also authored the first Homestead Act, which granted land to settlers willing to farm it.

Though he owned slaves, Benton came to oppose the institution of slavery after the Mexican–American War, and he opposed the Compromise of 1850 as too favorable to pro-slavery interests. This stance damaged Benton's popularity in Missouri, and the state legislature denied him re-election in 1851. Benton won election to the United States House of Representatives in 1852 but was defeated for re-election in 1854 after he opposed the Kansas–Nebraska Act. Benton's son-in-law, John C. Frémont, won the 1856 Republican Party nomination for president, but Benton voted for James Buchanan and remained a loyal Democrat until his death in 1858.

== Early life ==
Thomas Hart Benton was born in Hart's Mill, North Carolina, a settlement located near the present-day town of Hillsborough. His father Jesse Benton, a wealthy lawyer and landowner, died in 1790. His grandfather settled in the Province of North Carolina. Thomas H. Benton also studied law at the University of North Carolina where he was a member of the Philanthropic Society, but in 1799 he was dismissed from school after admitting to stealing money from fellow students. As Benton was leaving campus on the day he was expelled, he turned to the students who were jeering him and said, "I am leaving here now but damn you, you will hear from me again." He then left school to manage the Benton family estate, but historians posit that Benton used the events as motivation to prove himself worthy in adulthood.

Attracted by the opportunities in the West, the young Benton moved the family to a 40,000 acre (160 km^{2}) holding near Nashville, Tennessee. Here he established a plantation with accompanying schools, churches, and mills. His experience as a pioneer instilled a devotion to Jeffersonian democracy which continued through his political career.

In 1804, Benton worked as a clerk or "factor" at Gordon's Ferry on the Duck River stop on the Natchez Trace. It was said that Benton "speculated his way to a small fortune even before he reached his 21st birthday" but in what, exactly, he speculated goes unmentioned. He continued his legal education and was admitted to the Tennessee bar in 1805. In February 1806 he sold 253 skins and pelts to the Hardeman store in Williamson County, garnering about $120. Otter skins were the most valuable, at $2 each, followed by bear and beaver for $1 each, while fisher, wolf, and panther pelts were worth .50 each, and raccoon, muskrat, fox, and wildcat skins were worth .25 each.

In 1809 he served a term as state senator. He attracted the attention of Tennessee's "first citizen" Andrew Jackson, under whose tutelage he remained during the Tennessee years. He reportedly lived at the Hermitage in 1810 "as the aid of Gen. Jackson." One of his first cases as a lawyer was State vs. Harriet, defending an enslaved 11-year-old on charges of murder in the death of a 6-year-old White girl who drowned in a creek; Harriet was ultimately pardoned by the governor.

At the outbreak of the War of 1812, Jackson made Benton his aide-de-camp, with a commission as a lieutenant colonel. Benton was assigned to represent Jackson's interests to military officials in Washington D.C.; he chafed under the position, which denied him combat experience. In June 1813, Jackson dueled a member of Benton's staff and his brother Jesse Benton Jr. On September 4, 1813, Jackson and three of his nephews got into a fight with the Benton brothers at a hotel in Nashville, and Jackson was shot in the arm by Jesse. The bullet, which was removed during Jackson's presidency, broke a bone in his left arm. During the second year of the Creek War, in 1814, he was a colonel commanding the 39th Infantry Regiment, reporting to Thomas Flournoy. He reported that he had "advanced against the Indians along the Escambia River in July, almost certainly into Spanish territory." Benton wanted to march on Red Stick Creeks assembled around Spanish-controlled Pensacola but Benton got sick and instead militia lieutenant colonel George Nixon looped around Pensacola Bay before returning to American territory. In August 1814, troops under Benton constructed Fort Montgomery in the Mississippi Territory.

After the war, in 1815, Benton moved his estate to the newly opened Missouri Territory. As a Tennessean, he was under Jackson's shadow; in Missouri, he could be a big fish in the as-yet small pond. He settled in St. Louis, where he practiced law and edited the Missouri Enquirer, the second major newspaper west of the Mississippi River.

In 1817, during a court case he and opposing attorney Charles Lucas accused each other of lying. When Lucas ran into him at the voting polls he accused Benton of being delinquent in paying his taxes and thus should not be allowed to vote. Benton accused Lucas of being a "puppy" and Lucas challenged Benton to a duel. They had a duel on Bloody Island with Lucas being shot through the throat and Benton grazed in the knee. Upon bleeding profusely, Lucas said he was satisfied and Benton released him from completing the duel. However, rumors circulated that Benton, a better shot, had made the rules of 30 feet apart to favor him. Benton challenged Lucas to a rematch on Bloody Island with shots fired from nine feet. Lucas was shot close to the heart and before dying initially told Benton, "I do not or cannot forgive you." As death approached Lucas then stated, "I can forgive you—I do forgive you."

There is reason to believe Benton trafficked in enslaved pre-teen and young teen girls. According to James D. Davis' 1873 history of Memphis, Benton returned from the War of 1812 "with a beautiful French quadroon girl, with whom he lived some two or three years." This was Marie Louise Amarante Loiselle (1800?–1839), who later married Memphis mayor Marcus B. Winchester. Benton also purchased a 12-year-old enslaved girl named Phoebe Moore and resold her when she was 16 to Henry Clay, who kept her as a concubine and fathered her two children.

== United States Senate career ==
=== Early Senate career ===
The Missouri Compromise of 1820 made the territory into a state, and Benton was elected as one of its first senators. The presidential election of 1824 was a four-way struggle between Jackson, John Quincy Adams, William H. Crawford, and Henry Clay. Benton supported Clay. Jackson received a plurality but not a majority of electoral votes, meaning that the election was thrown to the House of Representatives, which would choose among the top three candidates. Clay was the fourth vote-getter, though he won the election in Missouri. He was also Speaker of the House, and tried to maneuver the election in favor of Adams. Benton refused Clay's requests that he support Adams, declaring that Jackson was the clear choice of the people. (Benton had no official role in this dispute, as he was not a Representative.) When Missouri's lone Representative John Scott told Benton he intended to vote for Adams, Benton urged him not to. "The vote which you intend thus to give is not your own—it belongs to the people of Missouri. They are against Mr. Adams. I, in their name, do solemnly protest against your intention, and deny your moral power thus to bestow your vote." Benton first supported Crawford, but after determining that he could not win, supported Jackson. Scott voted for Adams. Adams was elected and appointed Clay as Secretary of State. This was viewed by many as a "corrupt bargain".

=== Haiti ===
More than two decades after the Haitian Revolution, Benton explained the refusal of the American government to recognize Haiti in a speech to the United States Senate. He said that "the peace of eleven states in this Union will not permit the fruits of a successful negro insurrection to be exhibited among them" and said white Southerners would "not permit black Consuls and Ambassadors to establish themselves in our cities, and to parade through our country, and give their fellow blacks in the United States, proof in hand of the honors which await them, for a like successful effort on their part."

=== Jacksonian democracy ===
After this, Benton and Jackson put their personal differences behind them and joined forces. Benton became the senatorial leader for the Democratic Party and argued vigorously against the Bank of the United States. Jackson was censured by the Senate in 1834 for canceling the Bank's charter. At the close of the Jackson presidency, Benton led a successful "expungement campaign" in 1837 to remove the censure motion from the official record.

Benton was an unflagging advocate for "hard money", that is gold coin (specie) or bullion as money—as opposed to paper money "backed" by gold as in a "gold standard". "Soft" (i.e. paper or credit) currency, in his opinion, favored rich urban Easterners at the expense of the small farmers and tradespeople of the West. He proposed a law requiring payment for federal land in hard currency only, which was defeated in Congress but later enshrined in an executive order, the Specie Circular, by Jackson (1836). His position on currency earned him the nickname Old Bullion.

Senator Benton's greatest concern, however, was the territorial expansion of the United States to meet its "manifest destiny" as a continental power. He originally considered the natural border of the U.S. to be the Rocky Mountains but expanded his view to encompass the Pacific coast. He considered unsettled land to be insecure and tirelessly worked for settlement. His efforts against soft money were mostly to discourage land speculation, and thus encourage settlement.

Benton was instrumental in the sole administration of the Oregon Territory. Since the Anglo-American Convention of 1818, Oregon had been jointly occupied by both the United States and the United Kingdom. Benton pushed for a settlement on Oregon and the Canada–US border favorable to the United States. The current border at the 49th parallel set by the Oregon Treaty in 1846 was his choice; he was opposed to the extremism of the "Fifty-four forty or fight" movement during the Oregon boundary dispute.

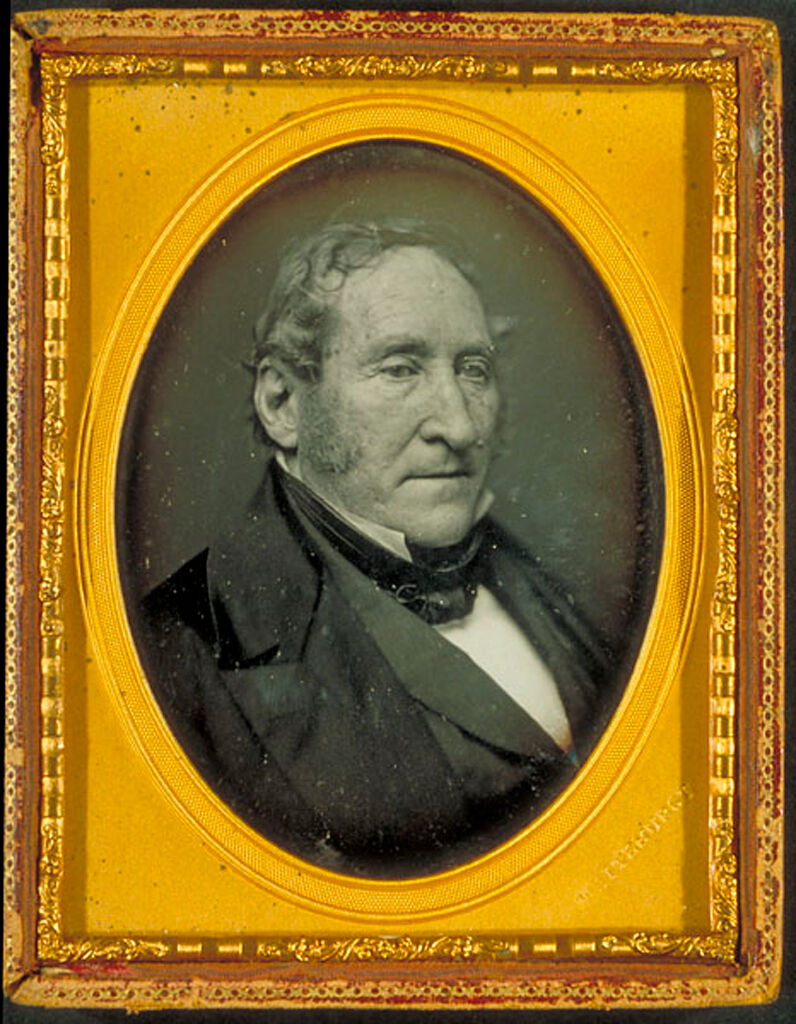
Daguerreotype of Thomas Hart Benton, c. 1850

Benton was the author of the first Homestead Acts, which encouraged settlement by giving land grants to anyone willing to work the soil. He pushed for greater exploration of the West, including support for his son-in-law John C. Frémont's numerous treks. He pushed hard for public support of the transcontinental railway and advocated greater use of the telegraph for long-distance communication. He was also a staunch advocate of the disenfranchisement and displacement of Native Americans in favor of European settlers.

He was an orator and leader of the first class, able to stand his own with or against fellow senators Daniel Webster, Henry Clay, and John C. Calhoun. Although an expansionist, his personal morals made him opposed to greedy or underhanded behavior—thus his opposition to "Fifty-Four Forty". Benton advocated the annexation of Texas and argued for the abrogation of the 1819 Adams-Onís Treaty in which the United States relinquished claims to that territory, but he was opposed to the machinations that led to its annexation in 1845 and the Mexican–American War. He believed that expansion was for the good of the country, and not for the benefit of powerful individuals.

On February 28, 1844, Benton was present at the USS Princeton explosion when a cannon misfired on the deck while giving a tour of the Potomac River. The incident killed at least seven people, including United States Secretary of State Abel P. Upshur and United States Secretary of the Navy Thomas W. Gilmer, and wounded over twenty. Benton was one of the injured, but his injury was not serious and he did not miss one day from the Senate.

=== Later Senate career and tension ===
His loyalty to the Democratic Party was legendary. Benton was the legislative right-hand man for Andrew Jackson and continued this role for Martin Van Buren. With the election of James K. Polk, however, his power began to ebb, and his views diverged from the party's. His career took a distinct downturn with the issue of slavery. Benton, a southerner and slave owner, became increasingly uncomfortable with the topic. He was also at odds with fellow Democrats, such as John C. Calhoun, who he thought put their opinions ahead of the Union to a treasonous degree. With troubled conscience, in 1849 he declared himself "against the institution of slavery," putting him against his party and popular opinion in his state. In April 1850, during heated Senate floor debates over the proposed Compromise of 1850, Benton was nearly shot by pistol-wielding Mississippi Senator Henry S. Foote, who had taken umbrage to Benton's vitriolic sparring with Vice-President Millard Fillmore. Foote was wrestled to the floor, where he was disarmed.

Benton has been described as "vain and pompous...yet he towered above his illustrious colleagues in intelligence, and integrity." The memoirs of a long-time Washington resident characterized the man and the decline in his electoral appeal over time:

Colonel Thomas Hart Benton, who had earned his military title during the war with Great Britain, was a large, heavily-framed man, with black curly hair and whiskers, prominent features and a stentorian voice. He wore the high, black silk neck-stock and the double-breasted frock coat of his youthful times during his thirty years' career in the Senate, varying with the seasons the materials of which his pantaloons were made, but never the fashion in which they were cut. When in debate, outraging every customary propriety of language, he would rush forward with blind fury upon every obstacle like the huge wild buffaloes then ranging the prairies of his adopted State, whose paths, be used to subsequently assert, would show the way through the passes of the Rocky Mountains. He was not a popular speaker, and when he took the floor occupants of the galleries invariably began to leave, while many Senators devoted themselves to their correspondence. In private life Colonel Benton was gentleness and domestic affection personified, and a desire to have his children profit by the superior advantages for their education in the District of Columbia kept him from his constituents in Missouri, where a new generation of voters grew up who did not know him and who would not follow his political lead."

== Later life ==
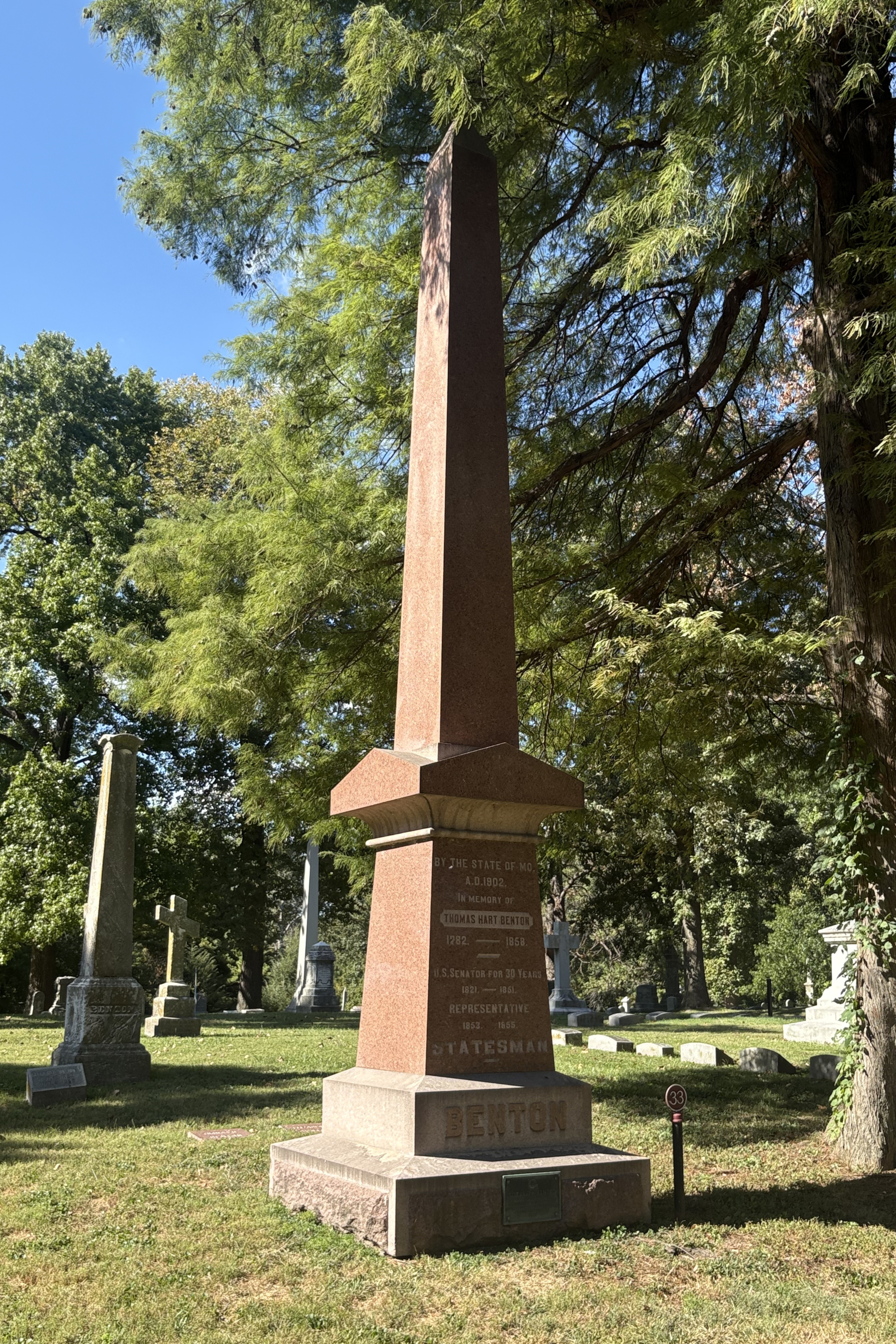
Benton's grave at Bellefontaine Cemetery

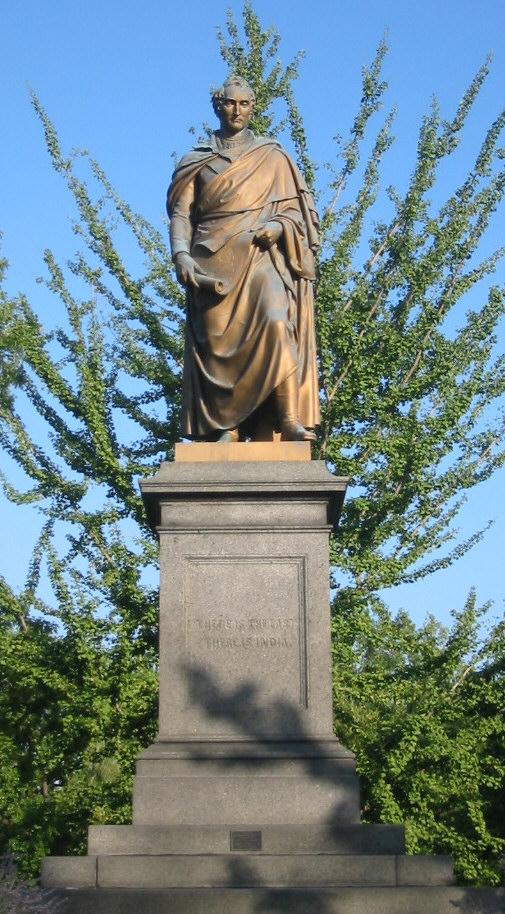
Statue of Benton by Harriet Hosmer erected in 1868 in St. Louis at Lafayette Park

In 1851, Benton was denied a sixth term by the Missouri legislature; the polarization of the slavery issue made it impossible for a moderate and Unionist to hold that state's senatorial seat. In 1852 he successfully ran for the United States House of Representatives, but his opposition to the Kansas–Nebraska Act led to his defeat in 1854. He ran for Governor of Missouri in 1856, but lost to Trusten Polk. That same year, his son-in-law, John C. Frémont, husband of his daughter Jessie, ran for President on the Republican Party ticket; but Benton was a party loyalist to the end and voted for Democratic nominee James Buchanan, who won the election.

He was elected a member of the American Antiquarian Society in 1855.

He published his autobiography, Thirty Years' View, in 1854, and Historical and legal examination of ... the decision of the Supreme Court ... in the Dred Scott case (arguing that the Court should have declined to decide the case, as political), in 1857.

He died in Washington, D.C., on April 10, 1858. His descendants have continued to be prominent in Missouri life; his great-grandnephew, also Thomas Hart Benton, was a 20th-century painter.

Benton is buried at Bellefontaine Cemetery in St. Louis. The Benton Park neighborhood of St. Louis is named after him.

== Family connections ==
Benton was related by marriage or blood to a number of 19th-century luminaries. Two of his nephews—Confederate Colonel and posthumous Brigadier General Samuel Benton of Mississippi, and Union Colonel and Brevet Brigadier General Thomas H. Benton Jr. of Iowa—fought on opposite sides during the Civil War. He was brother-in-law of James McDowell, Virginia Senator and Governor; father-in-law of John C. Frémont, explorer, Senator, presidential candidate, and Union Major General; and cousin-in-law of Senators Henry Clay and James Brown. He was the great-uncle of US Representative Maecenas Eason Benton, the father of painter Thomas Hart Benton.

== Legacy ==
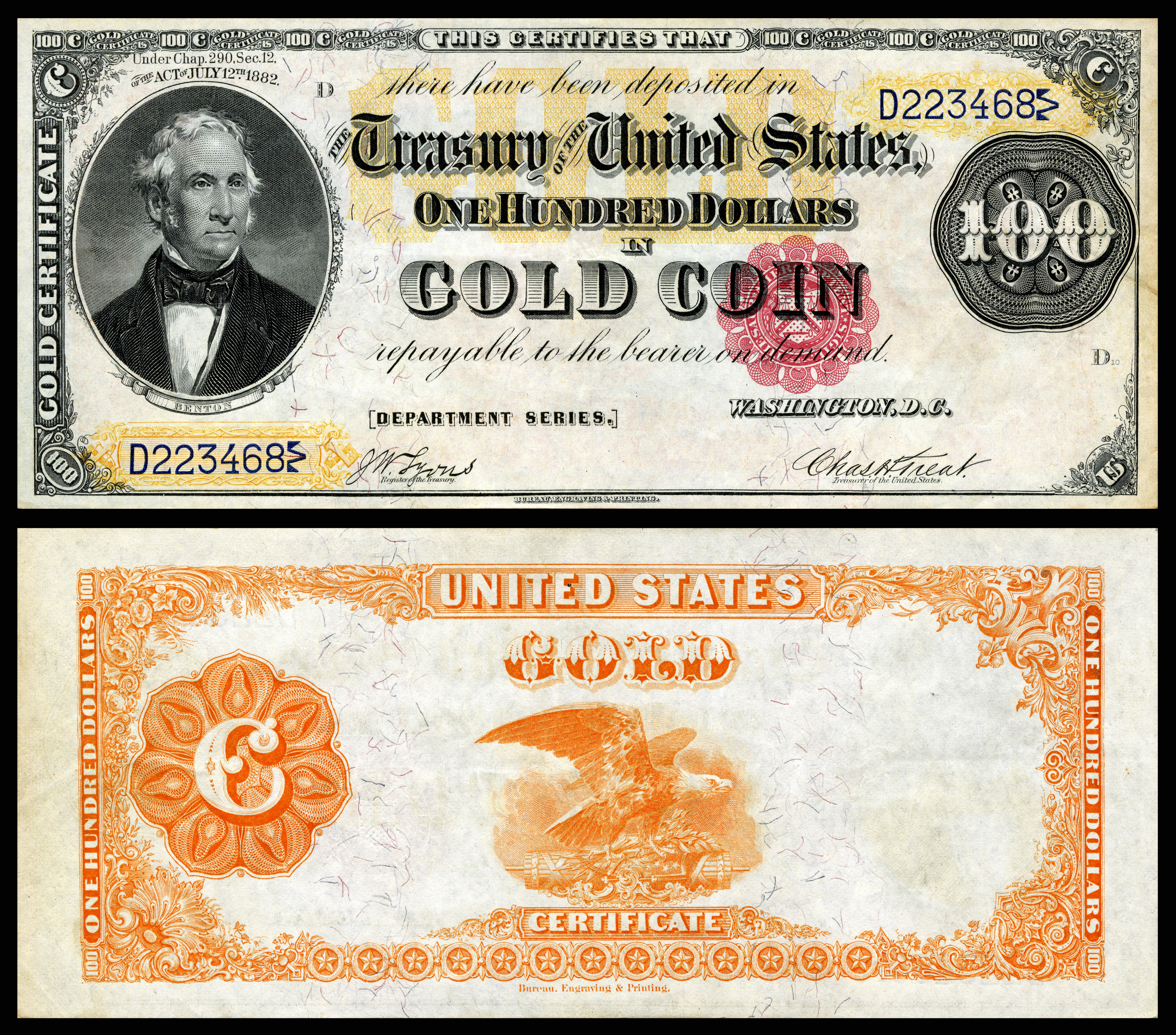
Benton depicted on an 1882 $100 Gold certificate

Seven states (Arkansas, Indiana, Iowa, Minnesota, Missouri, Oregon, and Washington) have counties named after Benton. Two counties (Calhoun County, Alabama, and Hernando County, Florida) were formerly named Benton County in his honor. During Reconstruction, Benton County, Mississippi, was misrepresented by residents as being named after Benton.

Bentonville, Indiana, was named for the senator, as were the towns of Benton & Bentonville, Arkansas, Benton, California, Benton Harbor, Michigan, Benton, Maine, Benton, Kentucky, Benton, Tennessee, Benton, Mississippi, Benton, Illinois, and Benton, Wisconsin. Additionally, the fur trading post and now community of Fort Benton, Montana, for which bentonite is named, was named after Benton.

In July 2018, the president of Oregon State University, Ed Ray, announced that three campus buildings would be renamed due to their namesakes' racism. One of these buildings, formerly known as the Benton Annex after Benton, became the Hattie Redmond Women and Gender Center. The choice to rename it after Redmond was made to recognize her efforts as an Oregonian suffragist.

Uniquely, Benton has been the subject of biographical study by two men who later became presidents of the United States. In 1887, Theodore Roosevelt published a biography of Benton. Benton is also one of the eight senators profiled in John F. Kennedy's 1956 book, Profiles in Courage. Benton appears at a Fourth of July parade in the 1876 novel The Adventures of Tom Sawyer by Mark Twain. At the beginning of chapter XXII it states: "Even the Glorious Fourth was in some sense a failure, for it rained hard, there was no procession in consequence, and the greatest man in the world (as Tom supposed), Mr. Benton, an actual United States Senator, proved an overwhelming disappointment—for he was not twenty-five feet high, nor even anywhere in the neighborhood of it."

== See also ==
- Thomas Hart Benton (Doyle), National Statuary Hall Collection
- Benton, Louisiana
- Title and rank in the antebellum U.S. South

== Bibliography ==
=== Secondary sources ===
- Chambers, William Nisbet. Old Bullion Benton, Senator from the New West: Thomas Hart Benton, 1782–1858. Boston: Little, Brown & Co., 1958.
- Meigs, William Montgomery. The Life of Thomas Hart Benton. Philadelphia: J.B. Lippincott, 1904.
- Mueller, Ken S. Senator Benton and the People: Master Race Democracy on the Early American Frontier. Urbana: Northern Illinois University Press, 2014.
- Rogers, Joseph M. Thomas H. Benton. Philadelphia: George W. Jacobs & Co., 1905.
- Roosevelt, Theodore. Thomas H. Benton. [1886] Boston: Houghton Mifflin Co., 1899.
- Smith, Elbert B. Magnificent Missourian: The Life of Thomas Hart Benton. Philadelphia: J.B. Lippincott, 1958.
- Parton, James (1860). Life of Andrew Jackson, Volume 3. New York: Mason Brothers.
- Wilentz, Sean (2005). Andrew Jackson. New York: Henry Holt and Company. ISBN 0-8050-6925-9.
- Marszalek, John F. (1997). The Petticoat Affair: Manners, Mutiny, and Sex in Andrew Jackson's White House. Free Press. ISBN 0-684-82801-4.

=== Primary sources ===
- Speech of Thomas H. Benton, of Missouri, Delivered March 14th, 1838, in the United States Senate on the Bill to Separate the Government from the Banks. Philadelphia: John Wilbank, 1838.
- Thirty Years' View; or, A History of the Working of the American Government for Thirty Years, from 1820 to 1850... In Two Volumes. New York: D. Appleton, 1854, 1856. Volume 1 | Volume 2
- Three Speeches...on the Subject of the Annexation of Texas to the United States. New York: n.p., 1844.
- Nebraska and Kansas Speech of Mr. Benton, of Missouri, in the House of Representatives, April 25, 1854 Congressional Globe, 1854.
- Historical and legal examination of that part of the decision of the Supreme Court of the United States in the Dred Scott case: which declares the unconstitutionality of the Missouri compromise act and the self-extension of the constitution to territories, carrying slavery along with it. New York: D. Appleton, 1857.

U.S. Senate
New seat	U.S. Senator (Class 1) from Missouri; 1821–1851; Served alongside: David Barton, Alexander Buckner, Lewis F. Linn, David Rice Atchison	Succeeded by Henry S. Geyer
Preceded by Henry Johnson	Chair of the Senate Indian Affairs Committee; 1823–1828	Succeeded by Hugh Lawson White
Preceded by William Henry Harrison	Chair of the Senate Military Affairs Committee; 1828–1841	Succeeded by William C. Preston
Preceded by John J. Crittenden	Chair of the Senate Military Affairs Committee; 1845–1849	Succeeded by Jefferson Davis
Preceded by Edward A. Hannegan	Chair of the Senate Foreign Relations Committee; 1849	Succeeded by William R. King
Honorary titles
Preceded by William R. King	Dean of the United States Senate; 1844–1851	Succeeded by Willie Person Mangum
U.S. House of Representatives
Preceded by John F. Darby	Member of the U.S. House of Representatives from Missouri's 1st congressional district 1853–1855	Succeeded by Luther M. Kennett
Preceded by William Henry Bissell	Chair of the House Military Affairs Committee; 1854–1855	Succeeded by John A. Quitman
