= National Register of Historic Places listings in St. Louis County, Missouri =

Location of St. Louis County in Missouri

This is a list of the National Register of Historic Places listings in St. Louis County, Missouri.

This is intended to be a complete list of the properties and districts on the National Register of Historic Places in St. Louis County, Missouri, United States. Latitude and longitude coordinates are provided for many National Register properties and districts; these locations may be seen together in a map. There are 193 properties and districts listed on the National Register in the county. Another 3 properties were once listed but have been removed.

The city of St. Louis is an independent city separate from St. Louis County, so properties and districts in the city of St. Louis are listed here.

This National Park Service list is complete through NPS recent listings posted November 6, 2026.

== Current listings ==
	Name on the Register	Image	Date listed	Location	City or town	Description
1	#1 Fairway		January 4, 2024 (#100009688)	11869 Fairlind Dr. 38°32′03″N 90°23′23″W	Sunset Hills	House adjacent to Sunset Country Club's first hole.
2	200 South Hanley Building		October 23, 2026 (#100013570)	200 South Hanley Road; 38°38′51″N 90°20′03″W	Clayton	
3	Affton High School	Affton High School	August 12, 2010 (#10000551)	8520 Mackenzie Rd. 38°33′26″N 90°19′18″W	Affton	
4	Alswel	Alswel	January 3, 1989 (#88001460)	12720 Alswell Lane; 38°30′21″N 90°24′16″W	Sunset Hills, Missouri	Built by German-American brewer William Lemp Jr., currently a private residence
5	Archambault House	Archambault House	May 13, 1976 (#76002178)	603 rue St. Denis; 38°47′43″N 90°19′29″W	Florissant	
6	Assumption Greek Orthodox Church	Assumption Greek Orthodox Church	September 23, 1980 (#80004389)	6900 Delmar Boulevard; 38°39′22″N 90°18′41″W	University City	
7	John C. and Georgie Atwood House	John C. and Georgie Atwood House	May 20, 2018 (#100002428)	100 S. Clay Ave. 38°44′35″N 90°18′02″W	Ferguson	
8	August Aubuchon House	August Aubuchon House	September 12, 1979 (#79003648)	1002 St. Louis; 38°47′30″N 90°19′17″W	Florissant	
9	Baptiste G. Aubuchon House	Baptiste G. Aubuchon House	May 6, 1976 (#76002179)	450 rue St. Jacques; 38°47′33″N 90°19′43″W	Florissant	
10	Ball-Essen Farmstead Historic District	Ball-Essen Farmstead Historic District	December 28, 2001 (#01001378)	749 Babler Park Dr. 38°37′36″N 90°40′25″W	Wildwood	
11	Bank of St. Ann		October 9, 2020 (#100005661)	10449 St. Charles Rock Rd. 38°43′45″N 90°23′03″W	St. Ann	
12	Barretts Tunnels	Barretts Tunnels	December 8, 1978 (#78003138)	3015 Barrett Station Rd. 38°34′11″N 90°27′53″W	Kirkwood	
13	Barteau House	Barteau House	September 12, 1979 (#79003649)	305 N. Castello St. 38°47′16″N 90°19′20″W	Florissant	
14	Barton House	Barton House	September 12, 1979 (#79003650)	680 St. Catherine; 38°47′30″N 90°19′36″W	Florissant	
15	Dr. Samuel A. Bassett Office and Residence	Dr. Samuel A. Bassett Office and Residence	February 3, 1993 (#92001866)	1200 S. Big Bend Boulevard; 38°37′52″N 90°19′08″W	Richmond Heights	
16	Romanzo N. Bayley House	Romanzo N. Bayley House	October 3, 2002 (#02001086)	419 E. Argonne; 38°34′53″N 90°23′55″W	Kirkwood	
17	Beaumont-Tyson Quarry District		October 10, 1974 (#74001079)	Address restricted	Crescent Hills	212 acres (86 ha) area which extends also into Jefferson County
18	Bellecourt Apartments	Bellecourt Apartments	September 16, 2002 (#02000983)	1107-1123 Bellevue Ave. 38°37′51″N 90°18′45″W	Richmond Heights	
19	Bennett Avenue Historic District	Bennett Avenue Historic District	March 20, 2008 (#08000228)	7901-8027 Bennett Ave. and 1221-1282 Laclede Station Rd. 38°37′55″N 90°19′45″W	Richmond Heights	
20	Louis Auguste Benoist House	Louis Auguste Benoist House	June 23, 1969 (#69000317)	7802 Genesta St. 38°34′09″N 90°18′45″W	Affton	
21	Beverly Theater	Beverly Theater	August 4, 2005 (#05000811)	7740 Olive Boulevard; 38°40′19″N 90°20′14″W	University City	
22	Big Chief Restaurant	Big Chief Restaurant	April 2, 2003 (#03000181)	17352 Old Manchester Rd. 38°34′52″N 90°39′35″W	Wildwood	
23	Gen. Daniel Bissell House	Gen. Daniel Bissell House	November 28, 1978 (#78003135)	10225 Bellefontaine Rd. 38°45′21″N 90°13′24″W	Bellefontaine Neighbors	
24	John P. and Dora Blake House	John P. and Dora Blake House	October 3, 2002 (#02001087)	549 N. Taylor; 38°35′19″N 90°24′17″W	Kirkwood	
25	B'Nai Amoona Synagogue	B'Nai Amoona Synagogue	April 22, 1984 (#84002698)	524 Trinity Ave. 38°39′17″N 90°18′38″W	University City	The building served the Congregation B'nai Amoona; it is currently the Center of Creative Arts (COCA).
26	Bockwrath-Wiese House	Bockwrath-Wiese House	February 2, 1979 (#79003676)	St. Ferdinand Park; 38°48′12″N 90°19′28″W	Florissant	
27	Bonhomme Creek Archeological District		November 21, 1974 (#74002207)	Straddling Wild Horse Creek Road between the Missouri River bluff and Bonhomme and Caulk's Creeks	Chesterfield	
28	William Bopp House	William Bopp House	April 5, 2006 (#06000218)	12120 Old Big Bend Rd. 38°34′09″N 90°26′01″W	Kirkwood	
29	Bouas House	Bouas House	September 12, 1979 (#79003651)	1290 St. Joseph; 38°47′34″N 90°19′00″W	Florissant	
30	Brentmoor Park, Brentmoor and Forest Ridge District	Brentmoor Park, Brentmoor and Forest Ridge District	September 23, 1982 (#82004716)	Big Bend and Wydown Boulevards; 38°38′36″N 90°19′19″W	Clayton	
31	Burkhardt Historic District	Burkhardt Historic District	August 31, 2000 (#00001011)	16662-16678 Chesterfield Airport Rd.; also the even-numbered properties of 16626-16660 Chesterfield Airport Rd. 38°39′50″N 90°34′45″W	Chesterfield	Second set of addresses represents a boundary increase of May 5, 2006
32	Dr. Leander W. Cape Buildings	Dr. Leander W. Cape Buildings	November 15, 2005 (#05001283)	7401-03 Hazel and 2737-47 Sutton; 38°36′48″N 90°19′13″W	Maplewood	
33	Carney-Keightley House	Carney-Keightley House	July 8, 2010 (#10000460)	930 Hawkins Rd. 38°30′07″N 90°28′56″W	Fenton	
34	Carrswold Historic District	Carrswold Historic District	September 9, 1982 (#82004889)	1-26 Carrswold Dr. 38°38′42″N 90°19′46″W	Clayton	
35	Casa Alvarez	Casa Alvarez	June 18, 1976 (#76002180)	289 rue St. Denis; 38°47′48″N 90°19′43″W	Florissant	
36	Central Webster Historic District	Central Webster Historic District	June 11, 1986 (#86001329)	Roughly bounded by E. and S. Cedar, Plant and W. Maple Aves., E. and W. Jackson Rd., and Gray Ave. 38°35′18″N 90°21′27″W	Webster Groves	
37	Charbonier Bluff	Charbonier Bluff	September 28, 1995 (#95001100)	Charbonier Rd. 38°48′52″N 90°23′04″W	Hazelwood	
38	Church Street Commercial District	Church Street Commercial District	August 23, 1984 (#84002701)	2-100 Church St. 38°44′42″N 90°18′17″W	Ferguson	
39	Judge Enos Clarke House	Judge Enos Clarke House	December 12, 2002 (#02001088)	503 E. Monroe; 38°34′45″N 90°23′50″W	Kirkwood	
40	Claverach Park	Claverach Park	August 24, 2015 (#15000537)	Roughly bounded by Broadview, Claverach, Crestwood, Harcourt, Hillvale & Ridgemoor Drs., Clayton Rd., Wydown Blvd. 38°38′23″N 90°19′23″W	Clayton	
41	Cold Water Cemetery	Cold Water Cemetery	May 19, 2004 (#04000462)	15290 Old Halls Ferry Rd. 38°50′05″N 90°16′59″W	Florissant	
42	James H. and Marietta Comfort House	James H. and Marietta Comfort House	October 3, 2002 (#02001089)	235 E. Jefferson; 38°34′57″N 90°24′10″W	Kirkwood	
43	Coral Court Motel	Coral Court Motel	April 25, 1989 (#89000311)	7755 Watson Rd. 38°34′20″N 90°20′05″W	Marlborough	Demolished.
44	Cori House	Cori House	October 2, 1986 (#86002799)	1080 N. Berry Rd. 38°35′55″N 90°22′35″W	Glendale	
45	Cragwold	Cragwold	December 30, 2009 (#09001175)	1455 Cragwold Rd. 38°33′20″N 90°26′16″W	Kirkwood	Estate house and nature reserve of Edwin A. Lemp, on the Meramec River
46	Crescent Quarry Archeological Site		February 12, 1971 (#71001030)	South of the Meramec River in the Crescent Hills; 38°31′41″N 90°34′16″W	Crescent	A square 1,000 feet (300 m) on each side; part of a large district of five square miles
47	Curtiss-Wright Aeroplane Factory	Curtiss-Wright Aeroplane Factory	September 6, 2016 (#16000586)	130 Banshee Rd. 38°45′29″N 90°21′56″W	Hazelwood	
48	Rudolph and Dorothy C. Czufin House	Rudolph and Dorothy C. Czufin House	July 12, 2002 (#02000792)	24 Dielman Rd. 38°39′14″N 90°22′32″W	Ladue	
49	Delmar Loop-Parkview Gardens Historic District	Delmar Loop-Parkview Gardens Historic District	February 16, 1984 (#84002624)	Roughly bounded by Kingsland Ave., North Dr., Delmar Boulevard, and Eastgate; 38°39′21″N 90°18′15″W	University City	
50	Des Peres Presbyterian Church	Des Peres Presbyterian Church	April 14, 1978 (#78003137)	2255 Geyer Rd. 38°37′22″N 90°25′12″W	Frontenac	
51	Donaldson Court Apartments	Donaldson Court Apartments	October 13, 1983 (#83004032)	601-615 Westgate Ave. 38°39′23″N 90°18′17″W	University City	
52	Douglas House	Douglas House	September 12, 1979 (#79003652)	801 St. Francois; 38°47′32″N 90°19′26″W	Florissant	
53	Downtown Kirkwood Historic District	Downtown Kirkwood Historic District	October 28, 2009 (#09000859)	105-133 E. Argonne, 100-159 W. Argonne, 108-212 N. Clay, 105-140 E. Jefferson, and 100-161 W. Jefferson; 38°34′55″N 90°24′24″W	Kirkwood	
54	Dr. Edmund A. Babler Memorial State Park Historic District	Dr. Edmund A. Babler Memorial State Park Historic District	February 27, 1985 (#85000539)	Northwest of Grover; 38°37′12″N 90°41′38″W	Grover	
55	East Monroe Historic District	East Monroe Historic District	July 14, 2004 (#04000695)	Roughly bounded by Madison Ave., S. Holmes St., Scott Ave., and Smith St. 38°34′49″N 90°23′59″W	Kirkwood	
56	Fairfax House	Fairfax House	April 15, 2004 (#04000280)	9401 Manchester Rd. 38°36′43″N 90°21′45″W	Rock Hill	
57	Farmers State Bank of Chesterfield	Farmers State Bank of Chesterfield	August 20, 1999 (#99001019)	16676-78 Old Chesterfield Rd. 38°39′50″N 90°34′46″W	Chesterfield	
58	Father Dickson Cemetery	Father Dickson Cemetery	October 6, 2021 (#14001125)	845 South Sappington Rd. 38°33′54″N 90°23′05″W	Crestwood	
59	Ferguson School Central School	Ferguson School Central School	September 7, 1984 (#84002706)	201 Wesley Ave. 38°44′34″N 90°18′28″W	Ferguson	
60	Charles W. Ferguson House	Charles W. Ferguson House	September 18, 1984 (#84002704)	15-17 W. Lockwood Ave. 38°35′35″N 90°21′26″W	Webster Groves	
61	George W. and Virginia Fishback House	George W. and Virginia Fishback House	October 3, 2002 (#02001090)	440 E. Argonne; 38°34′51″N 90°23′53″W	Kirkwood	
62	Fort Bellefontaine	Fort Bellefontaine	February 23, 2016 (#16000031)	Fort Belle Fontaine County Park; 38°49′36″N 90°12′59″W	Black Jack	
63	Louisa Garrett House	Louisa Garrett House	June 27, 2007 (#07000618)	280 Washington St. 38°47′35″N 90°19′54″W	Florissant	
64	Glen Echo Historic District	Glen Echo Historic District	October 25, 2007 (#07001105)	3401 Lucas-Hunt Rd., 7202-48 Henderson Ave., and 7200-71 St. Andrews Pl. 38°42′04″N 90°17′52″W	Normandy and Glen Echo Park	
65	Goldbeck House	Goldbeck House	September 12, 1979 (#79003653)	1061 St. Louis; 38°47′30″N 90°19′14″W	Florissant	
66	Gorlock Building	Gorlock Building	November 8, 1984 (#84000256)	101-113 W. Lockwood Ave. 38°35′35″N 90°21′33″W	Webster Groves	
67	Grace Episcopal Church	Grace Episcopal Church	April 12, 1982 (#82004720)	Taylor and Argonne Sts. 38°34′51″N 90°24′12″W	Kirkwood	
68	Greenwood Cemetery	Greenwood Cemetery	February 24, 2004 (#04000090)	6571 St. Louis Ave. 38°41′19″N 90°17′19″W	Hillsdale	
69	Greenwood Historic District	Greenwood Historic District	April 12, 2006 (#06000246)	3500-3540 Greenwood and 7518 St. Elmo; 38°36′24″N 90°19′14″W	Maplewood	
70	Haarstick-Whittemore Houses	Haarstick-Whittemore Houses	September 20, 1982 (#82004717)	6420 and 6440 Forsyth Boulevard; 38°38′46″N 90°18′32″W	Clayton	Presently home to the Whittemore House Club
71	Egbert W. Halsey Cottage	Egbert W. Halsey Cottage	October 3, 2002 (#02001091)	126 E. Washington; 38°35′04″N 90°24′17″W	Kirkwood	
72	Harry Hammerman House	Harry Hammerman House	March 20, 2008 (#08000227)	219 Graybridge Ln. 38°39′24″N 90°22′21″W	Ladue	
73	Hampton Park	Hampton Park	December 21, 2005 (#05001437)	1108-1176 Center Dr., 1012-1259 Hampton Park Dr., 1140-1173 Hillside Dr., 7914-8045 Park Dr., and 8000-8062 South Dr. 38°38′09″N 90°19′54″W	Richmond Heights	
74	Martin Franklin Hanley House	Martin Franklin Hanley House	May 27, 1971 (#71001029)	7600 Westmoreland Ave. 38°39′06″N 90°19′54″W	Clayton	
75	Hanson House	Hanson House	September 12, 1979 (#79003654)	704 Ste. Catherine; 38°47′30″N 90°19′34″W	Florissant	
76	Hawken House	Hawken House	February 16, 1970 (#70000858)	1155 S. Rock Hill Rd. 38°34′24″N 90°22′34″W	Webster Groves	
77	Nathaniel Hawthorne Elementary School	Nathaniel Hawthorne Elementary School	October 2, 2017 (#100001688)	1351 N. Hanley Rd. 38°40′29″N 90°19′50″W	University City	
78	Henry Avenue Historic District	Henry Avenue Historic District	January 8, 2003 (#02001692)	120, 210, 211, 218, 220, 226, 230, 310, 314, and 320 Henry Ave. 38°35′33″N 90°31′06″W	Manchester	
79	Hi-Pointe-De Mun Historic District	Hi-Pointe-De Mun Historic District	May 7, 2005 (#05000370)	Roughly bounded by S. Skinker Boulevard, Clayton Rd., Seminary Place, De Mun Ave., and Northwood Ave.; also roughly bounded by Clayton Rd., De Mun Ave., San Bonita Ave., and Big Bend Boulevard; 38°38′14″N 90°18′31″W	Clayton	Second set of boundaries represents a boundary increase of March 22, 2007
80	Hubecky House	Hubecky House	September 12, 1979 (#79003674)	917 Lafayette; 38°47′46″N 90°19′24″W	Florissant	Missouri French style house built in 1922. Adjacent to similar Meyer House.
81	Wilson Price Hunt House	Wilson Price Hunt House	September 23, 1980 (#80004386)	7717 Natural Bridge Rd. 38°42′25″N 90°18′15″W	Normandy	
82	J. Milton Turner School	J. Milton Turner School	August 22, 2002 (#02000905)	238 Meacham Ave., and 245 Saratoga Ave. 38°33′54″N 90°24′09″W	Kirkwood	
83	Jarville	Jarville	February 16, 1984 (#84002634)	1723 Mason Rd. 38°36′30″N 90°29′10″W	Between Manchester and Town and Country	
84	Jefferson Barracks Historic District	Jefferson Barracks Historic District	February 1, 1972 (#72001492)	10 miles (16 km) south of St. Louis on the Mississippi River; 38°29′53″N 90°16′28″W	Lemay	
85	Jefferson Barracks National Cemetery	Jefferson Barracks National Cemetery	July 9, 1998 (#98000840)	2900 Sheridan Rd. 38°29′50″N 90°17′24″W	Green Park	
86	Jefferson-Argonne Historic District	Jefferson-Argonne Historic District	July 14, 2004 (#04000696)	Roughly defined as being both sides of Jefferson Ave. and the northern side of Argonne between Taylor St. and Holmes Ave. 38°34′53″N 90°23′49″W	Kirkwood	
87	David Keith House	David Keith House	October 3, 2002 (#02001094)	116 N. Woodlawn; 38°34′54″N 90°23′49″W	Kirkwood	
88	Kirkwood Missouri Pacific Depot	Kirkwood Missouri Pacific Depot	July 5, 1985 (#85001476)	W. Argonne Dr. at Kirkwood Rd. 38°34′54″N 90°24′29″W	Kirkwood	
89	Robert Koch Hospital	Robert Koch Hospital	October 31, 1984 (#84000206)	4101 Koch Rd. 38°28′57″N 90°17′05″W	Oakville	Demolished in 1989.
90	Kramer House	Kramer House	September 12, 1979 (#79003675)	520 Ste. Catherine; 38°47′33″N 90°19′40″W	Florissant	
91	Russell and Ruth Goetz Kraus House	Russell and Ruth Goetz Kraus House	January 31, 1997 (#96001595)	120 N. Ballas Rd. 38°34′57″N 90°26′31″W	Kirkwood	
92	Kreienkamp Store	Kreienkamp Store	May 5, 2000 (#00000439)	19160 Melrose Rd. 38°34′19″N 90°43′15″W	Wildwood	
93	Kuehn House	Kuehn House	September 12, 1979 (#79003655)	410 S. Harrison; 38°47′30″N 90°19′52″W	Florissant	Finest example of Missouri German architecture in the area.
94	Ladue Estates	Ladue Estates	May 26, 2010 (#09000901)	1-80 Ladue Estates Dr. 38°39′18″N 90°25′44″W	Creve Coeur	
95	Lance House	Lance House	September 12, 1979 (#79003656)	508 St. Antoine; 38°47′45″N 90°19′31″W	Florissant	
96	Marcus Laramie House	Marcus Laramie House	September 12, 1979 (#79003657)	929 St. Denis; 38°47′35″N 90°19′16″W	Florissant	
97	Wilson Larimore House	Wilson Larimore House	February 10, 1989 (#88003244)	11510 Larimore Rd. 38°46′27″N 90°12′05″W	Bellefontaine Neighbors	
98	Theodore Link Historic Buildings	Theodore Link Historic Buildings	September 11, 1980 (#80004390)	7100, 7104, and 7108 Delmar Boulevard; 38°39′24″N 90°19′01″W	University City	
99	William Long Log House	William Long Log House	December 5, 1978 (#78003136)	9385 Pardee Rd. 38°32′47″N 90°21′51″W	Crestwood	
100	The Lyceum	The Lyceum	April 3, 1979 (#79003206)	14318 Manchester Road; 38°35′33″N 90°30′37″W	Manchester	
101	Manchester Methodist Episcopal Church	Manchester Methodist Episcopal Church	February 10, 1983 (#83001053)	129 Woods Mill Rd. 38°35′41″N 90°30′34″W	Manchester	
102	Maplewood Commercial Historic District at Manchester and Sutton	Maplewood Commercial Historic District at Manchester and Sutton	December 20, 2006 (#06001135)	Roughly bounded by Manchester, Marietta, Marshall, and Sutton; 38°36′53″N 90°19′06″W	Maplewood	
103	Maplewood Historic Commercial District	Maplewood Historic Commercial District	November 14, 2019 (#100004603)	7145-7233 & 7146-7192 Manchester Blvd., 7209-11 Lanham; 38°36′55″N 90°18′43″W	Maplewood	
104	Marshall Place Historic District	Marshall Place Historic District	June 17, 1982 (#82004726)	Marshall Pl. 38°35′45″N 90°21′28″W	Webster Groves	
105	Maryland Terrace Historic District	Maryland Terrace Historic District	September 3, 1998 (#98001137)	7001-7419 Maryland Ave. and 7001-7394 Westmoreland Dr. 38°39′03″N 90°19′22″W	University City	
106	McGarry House	McGarry House	April 12, 1982 (#82004724)	6965 Pershing Ave. 38°39′10″N 90°18′51″W	University City	
107	Lizzie McLagan House	Lizzie McLagan House	October 3, 2002 (#02001092)	549 E. Argonne; 38°34′52″N 90°23′44″W	Kirkwood	
108	Patrick and Moire McMullen House	Patrick and Moire McMullen House	October 3, 2002 (#02001093)	212 W. Monroe; 38°34′44″N 90°24′32″W	Kirkwood	
109	McPherson-Holland House	McPherson-Holland House	September 16, 1982 (#82004719)	115 Edwin Ave. 38°35′10″N 90°23′07″W	Glendale	
110	Meramec River U.S. 66 Bridge - J421	Meramec River U.S. 66 Bridge - J421	September 16, 2009 (#09000888)	Historic U.S. Route 66 spanning the Meramec River; 38°30′20″N 90°35′31″W	Eureka	Riveted Warren deck truss bridge
111	Meyer House	Meyer House	September 12, 1979 (#79003658)	915 N. Lafayette; 38°47′46″N 90°19′25″W	Florissant	1922-built Missouri French house adjacent to similar Hubecky House
112	Frank Moellring House	Frank Moellring House	September 12, 1979 (#79003659)	1002 Boone; 38°47′42″N 90°19′13″W	Florissant	
113	Moller House	Moller House	September 12, 1979 (#79003660)	300 Washington; 38°47′34″N 90°19′51″W	Florissant	
114	Moorlands Addition Apartment District	Moorlands Addition Apartment District	September 30, 2009 (#09000787)	Roughly bounded by Clayton Rd., Glenridge Ave., Wydown Boulevard, and both sides of Westwood Dr. 38°38′23″N 90°19′53″W	Clayton	
115	Mount Hope Cemetery	Mount Hope Cemetery	October 3, 2003 (#03000994)	1215 Lemay Ferry Rd. 38°32′02″N 90°17′29″W	Lemay	
116	Mudd's Grove	Mudd's Grove	April 5, 1984 (#84002710)	302 W. Argonne Dr. 38°34′52″N 90°24′39″W	Kirkwood	
117	Joseph and Ann Murphy Residence	Joseph and Ann Murphy Residence	May 10, 2010 (#10000246)	7901 Stanford Ave. 38°39′46″N 90°20′31″W	University City	
118	John B. Myers House	John B. Myers House	December 13, 1974 (#74002210)	180 Dunn Rd.; also 108 Dunn Rd. 38°46′35″N 90°20′13″W	Florissant	108 Dunn represents a boundary increase of September 19, 1977
119	Narrow Gauge Railroad Station	Narrow Gauge Railroad Station	September 12, 1979 (#79003661)	1060 St. Catherine; 38°47′23″N 90°19′21″W	Florissant	
120	New Mount Sinai Cemetery	New Mount Sinai Cemetery	December 22, 2005 (#05001434)	8430 Gravois Rd. 38°33′25″N 90°18′20″W	Affton	
121	Nicolay House	Nicolay House	September 12, 1979 (#79003662)	549 N. St. Jacques; 38°47′36″N 90°19′42″W	Florissant	
122	Nims Mansion	Nims Mansion	October 2, 2017 (#100001689)	2741 Finestown Rd. 38°24′35″N 90°19′27″W	Oakville	
123	Prof. Frances E. Nipher House	Prof. Frances E. Nipher House	October 3, 2002 (#02001095)	435 N. Harrison; 38°35′08″N 90°24′41″W	Kirkwood	
124	North Taylor Avenue Historic District	North Taylor Avenue Historic District	August 7, 2012 (#12000474)	Roughly bounded by Manchester Rd., E. Adams, & N. Taylor Aves. 38°35′32″N 90°24′14″W	Kirkwood	
125	Norwood Hills Country Club	Norwood Hills Country Club	February 25, 2005 (#05000084)	1 Norwood Hills Country Club Dr. 38°43′20″N 90°17′02″W	Jennings	
126	Old Ferguson West Historic District	Old Ferguson West Historic District	November 2, 2011 (#11000784)	Roughly bounded by Carson Rd., Harvey & Tiffin Aves. & Florissant Rd. 38°44′33″N 90°18′32″W	Ferguson	
127	Old Stone Church	Old Stone Church	April 13, 1973 (#73002274)	Conway Rd. at White Rd. 38°38′57″N 90°31′33″W	Chesterfield	
128	Old Webster Historic District	Old Webster Historic District	August 4, 2004 (#04000782)	Roughly bounded by Allen Ave., Elm Ave., W. Lockwood Ave. and the Missouri Pacific RR Tracks; also 50-54 W Moody Ave. 38°35′43″N 90°21′32″W	Webster Groves	Second set of addresses represent a boundary increase approved November 13, 2018.
129	Olive Chapel African Methodist Episcopal Church	Olive Chapel African Methodist Episcopal Church	April 20, 2004 (#04000345)	309 S. Harrison Ave. 38°34′44″N 90°24′39″W	Kirkwood	
130	Orrville Historic District	Orrville Historic District	October 18, 2003 (#03001053)	526 and 538 Eatherton Rd. 38°38′14″N 90°39′34″W	Wildwood	
131	Osage Hills School	Osage Hills School	May 24, 2007 (#07000462)	1110 Glenwood S 38°33′55″N 90°26′30″W	Kirkwood	
132	Theodore A. Pappas House	Theodore A. Pappas House	February 14, 1979 (#79003208)	865 Masonridge Rd. 38°38′13″N 90°29′03″W	Creve Coeur	
133	George M. Park House		January 26, 2023 (#100008572)	440 South Price Rd. 38°38′58″N 90°22′00″W	Ladue	
134	Parkview Historic District	Parkview Historic District	March 14, 1986 (#86000788)	Roughly bounded by Delmar Ave., Skinker and Millbrook Boulevards, and Mellville Ave. 38°39′08″N 90°18′11″W	University City	
135	Parkview Towers	Parkview Towers	July 24, 2024 (#100010557)	701 Westgate Avenue; 38°39′25″N 90°18′17″W	University City	
136	Pasadena Hills Historic District	Pasadena Hills Historic District	December 4, 2004 (#04001281)	Bounded by the city limits of Pasadena Hills; 38°42′26″N 90°19′55″W	Pasadena Hills	
137	Elisha and Lucy Patterson Farmstead Historic District	Elisha and Lucy Patterson Farmstead Historic District	November 17, 2004 (#04001242)	15505 New Halls Ferry Rd. 38°49′38″N 90°18′38″W	Florissant	
138	Payne-Gentry House	Payne-Gentry House	April 17, 1979 (#79003202)	4211 Fee Fee Rd. 38°44′50″N 90°23′59″W	Bridgeton	
139	Peters House	Peters House	September 12, 1979 (#79003664)	903 rue St. Francois; 38°47′28″N 90°19′21″W	Florissant	
140	Pine Lawn Carriage House	Pine Lawn Carriage House	February 16, 1984 (#84002666)	6292-94 Stillwell Dr. 38°41′27″N 90°16′48″W	Pine Lawn	Demolished
141	Samuel Plant House	Samuel Plant House	April 19, 1984 (#84002711)	800 Cella Rd. 38°38′39″N 90°22′20″W	Ladue	
142	Pond School	Pond School	November 6, 2012 (#12000910)	17123 Manchester Rd. 38°34′40″N 90°38′48″W	Wildwood	
143	Price School	Price School	February 14, 1985 (#85000285)	Price School Lane; 38°38′20″N 90°22′20″W	Ladue	Demolished
144	Charles S. and Mary Warder Rannells House	Charles S. and Mary Warder Rannells House	September 20, 2006 (#06000861)	2200 Bredell; 38°37′16″N 90°19′34″W	Maplewood	
145	Red Cedar Inn	Red Cedar Inn	April 2, 2003 (#03000180)	1047 East Osage; 38°28′53″N 90°43′02″W	Pacific	
146	Reeb House	Reeb House	September 12, 1979 (#79003665)	446 St. Charles; 38°47′41″N 90°19′58″W	Florissant	
147	Theodore and Lena Richter House	Theodore and Lena Richter House	December 5, 2002 (#02001096)	229 S. Van Buren; 38°34′46″N 90°25′00″W	Kirkwood	
148	Rickelman House	Rickelman House	September 12, 1979 (#79003666)	680 Washington; 38°47′28″N 90°19′38″W	Florissant	
149	Otto Ripple Agency	Otto Ripple Agency	September 12, 1979 (#79003663)	755 rue St. Francois; 38°47′33″N 90°19′28″W	Florissant	
150	George R. and Elsie Robinson House	George R. and Elsie Robinson House	October 31, 2002 (#02001268)	443 E. Argonne; 38°34′53″N 90°23′52″W	Kirkwood	
151	Rock House, Edgewood Children's Center	Rock House, Edgewood Children's Center	September 9, 1982 (#82004727)	330 N. Gore; 38°35′55″N 90°21′53″W	Webster Groves	
152	Rockwood Court Apartments	Rockwood Court Apartments	April 5, 2006 (#06000222)	330 W. Lockwood; 38°35′42″N 90°21′51″W	Webster Groves	
153	Rott School	Rott School	September 15, 2005 (#05001022)	9455 Rott Rd. 38°32′10″N 90°25′19″W	Sunset Hills	
154	St. Ferdinand Central Historic District	St. Ferdinand Central Historic District	September 12, 1979 (#79003647)	Roughly bounded by rue St. Francois, rue St. Ferdinand, and rue St. Denis, and Lafayette St. 38°47′41″N 90°19′38″W	Florissant	
155	St. Ferdinand's Shrine Historic District	St. Ferdinand's Shrine Historic District	September 12, 1979 (#79003759)	Between Cold Water and Fountain Creeks; 38°47′47″N 90°20′02″W	Florissant	
156	St. Stanislaus Seminary	St. Stanislaus Seminary	September 22, 1972 (#72001491)	700 Howdershell Rd. 38°32′15″N 90°17′16″W	Florissant	
157	St. Vincent's Hospital	St. Vincent's Hospital	April 12, 1982 (#82004722)	7301 St. Charles Rock Rd. 38°41′32″N 90°18′23″W	Normandy	
158	Sancta Maria in Ripa	Sancta Maria in Ripa	October 11, 2022 (#100008257)	320 East Ripa Ave. 38°31′27″N 90°16′19″W	Lemay	
159	Joseph Sappington House	Joseph Sappington House	October 14, 1982 (#82000589)	Southwest of Affton at 10734 Clearwater Drive; 38°32′15″N 90°21′21″W	Affton	
160	Thomas J. Sappington House	Thomas J. Sappington House	June 28, 1974 (#74002209)	1015 S. Sappington Rd. 38°33′51″N 90°23′05″W	Crestwood	
161	Zephaniah Sappington House	Zephaniah Sappington House	September 18, 1980 (#80004384)	Originally located south of Crestwood at 11145 Gravois Rd. 38°32′29″N 90°22′08″W	Crestwood	Now known as the Sappington-Dressel House, the original house was dismantled and moved to Defiance, Missouri where it was acquired and completely reconstructed by Lindenwood University.
162	Saratoga Lanes Building	Saratoga Lanes Building	January 29, 2008 (#07001492)	2725 Sutton Boulevard; 38°36′48″N 90°19′13″W	Maplewood	
163	Schmidt House	Schmidt House	September 12, 1979 (#79003667)	359 St. Jean; 38°47′33″N 90°19′50″W	Florissant	
164	Schoonover House	Schoonover House	September 12, 1979 (#79003668)	983 St. Antoine; 38°47′38″N 90°19′13″W	Florissant	
165	Seven Gables Building	Seven Gables Building	July 16, 1985 (#85001564)	18-26 N. Meramec; 38°39′04″N 90°20′21″W	Clayton	See Meier and Comfort for more information.
166	Seven-Up Headquarters Building		October 21, 2026 (#100013568)	121 S. Meramec Ave. 38°38′53″N 90°20′24″W	Clayton	
167	Shanley Building	Shanley Building	September 20, 1982 (#82004718)	7800 Maryland Ave. 38°39′05″N 90°20′13″W	Clayton	
168	Sioux Passage Park Archeological Site		July 24, 1974 (#74002211)	Address Restricted	Florissant	
169	Smith House	Smith House	September 12, 1979 (#79003669)	310 Florissant Rd. 38°47′17″N 90°19′22″W	Florissant	
170	Stroer House	Stroer House	September 12, 1979 (#79003670)	700 Aubuchon; 38°47′26″N 90°19′04″W	Florissant	
171	Sutter-Meyer House	Sutter-Meyer House	April 12, 1982 (#82004725)	6826 Chamberlain Court; 38°39′50″N 90°18′41″W	University City	
172	Taille de Noyer	Taille de Noyer	January 10, 1980 (#80004385)	1 rue Taille de Noyer; 38°46′17″N 90°18′36″W	Florissant	
173	Tebeau House	Tebeau House	September 12, 1979 (#79003671)	250 St. Catherine; 38°47′39″N 90°19′53″W	Florissant	Missouri German architecture
174	Marvin Tebeau House	Marvin Tebeau House	September 12, 1979 (#79003672)	449 St. Joseph; 38°47′52″N 90°19′32″W	Florissant	Missouri French architecture
175	Thornhill	Thornhill	July 18, 1974 (#74002208)	Olive Street Rd. in Faust County Park; 38°40′06″N 90°32′44″W	Chesterfield	
176	Rosalie Tilles Park	Rosalie Tilles Park	April 19, 2018 (#100002336)	9551 Litzsinger Rd. 38°37′10″N 90°21′57″W	Ladue	
177	G.W. Tolhurst House	G.W. Tolhurst House	October 3, 2002 (#02001097)	345 E. Argonne; 38°34′53″N 90°24′01″W	Kirkwood	
178	Tuxedo Park Christian Church	Tuxedo Park Christian Church	November 8, 2006 (#06000988)	700 Tuxedo Boulevard; 38°36′12″N 90°20′30″W	Webster Groves	
179	Tuxedo Park Station	Tuxedo Park Station	March 22, 1984 (#84002713)	643 Glen Rd. 38°36′08″N 90°20′52″W	Webster Groves	Former Missouri Pacific Railroad depot.
180	U.S. Army Publications Distribution Center	U.S. Army Publications Distribution Center	October 5, 2015 (#15000704)	1655 Woodson Rd. 38°41′00″N 90°21′53″W	Overland	
181	University City Education District	University City Education District	January 31, 1985 (#85000172)	7400 and 7401 Balson Ave. and 951 N. Hanley Rd. 38°39′53″N 90°19′51″W	University City	
182	University City Plaza	University City Plaza	March 7, 1975 (#75002092)	Roughly bounded by Delmar Boulevard and Trinity, Harvard, and Kingsland Aves. 38°39′27″N 90°18′34″W	University City	City Hall (University City, Missouri) is a contributing property
183	University Heights Subdivision Number One	University Heights Subdivision Number One	September 23, 1980 (#80004391)	Roughly bounded by Delmar Boulevard and Yale, Dartmouth, and Harvard Aves. 38°39′34″N 90°18′38″W	University City	
184	Elijah J. Unsell House	Elijah J. Unsell House	December 12, 2002 (#02001098)	615 E. Monroe; 38°34′44″N 90°23′39″W	Kirkwood	
185	The Van Raalte Residence		September 25, 2025 (#100012284)	440 Hunter's Hill Drive; 38°38′51″N 90°31′08″W	Chesterfield	
186	James W. and Mary Way House	James W. and Mary Way House	December 12, 2002 (#02001099)	305 N. Harrison; 38°35′00″N 90°24′42″W	Kirkwood	
187	Webster College-Eden Theological Seminary Collegiate District	Webster College-Eden Theological Seminary Collegiate District	December 28, 1982 (#82000590)	470 and 475 E. Lockwood Ave. 38°35′29″N 90°20′43″W	Webster Groves	
188	Webster Park Residential Historic District	Webster Park Residential Historic District	December 30, 2008 (#08001260)	Roughly bounded by Newport, Bompart, E. Lockwood, N. Maple, and Glen Rd. 38°35′43″N 90°20′55″W	Webster Groves	
189	White Haven; Ulysses S. Grant National Historic Site	White Haven; Ulysses S. Grant National Historic Site	April 4, 1979 (#79003205)	9060 Whitehaven Dr. or 7400 Grant Street; 38°33′06″N 90°21′06″W	Grantwood Village	
190	Wildwood House	Wildwood House	April 5, 2006 (#06000234)	40 Dames Court; 38°44′42″N 90°17′30″W	Ferguson	
191	Williams Creek Archeological District		November 23, 1977 (#77001527)	Address Restricted	St. Louis	
192	Withington House	Withington House	September 12, 1979 (#79003673)	502 St. Marie; 38°47′24″N 90°19′49″W	Florissant	Missouri German architecture
193	Wydown-Forsyth District	Wydown-Forsyth District	May 23, 1988 (#88000628)	Roughly bounded by Forsyth, Skinker Boulevard, Fauquier, Wydown Terrace Dr., and University Ln. 38°38′38″N 90°18′25″W	Clayton	

== Former listings ==
	Name on the Register	Image	Date listed	Date removed	Location	City or town	Description
1	Busch's Grove	Busch's Grove	September 9, 1982 (#82004721)	January 7, 2005	9160 Clayton Rd. 38°38′28″N 90°22′01″W	Ladue	Demolished in 2003.
2	Miles A. Seed Carriage House	Miles A. Seed Carriage House	March 25, 1987 (#87000455)	December 19, 1994	2456 Hord Ave., rear 38°38′28″N 90°22′01″W	Jennings	Delisted after being relocated to Faust Park in 1991.
3	Utz-Tesson House	Utz-Tesson House	January 22, 1973 (#73002178)	August 21, 2015	615 Utz Lane; 38°46′46″N 90°22′03″W	Hazelwood	Delisted due to relocation in 2003 to Brookes Park in Hazelwood.

== See also ==
- List of National Historic Landmarks in Missouri
- National Register of Historic Places listings in Missouri
