= Concrete Block House =

Concrete Block House may refer to:

- Concrete Block House (614 N. 4th Ave., Phoenix, Arizona), listed on the National Register of Historic Places in Maricopa County, Arizona
- Concrete Block House (618 N. 4th Ave., Phoenix, Arizona), listed on the National Register of Historic Places in Maricopa County, Arizona
- Concrete Block House (640 N. 6th Ave., Phoenix, Arizona), listed on the National Register of Historic Places in Maricopa County, Arizona

== See also ==
- Goodfellow-Julian Concrete Block District, St. Louis, Missouri, National Register of Historic Places listings in St. Louis, Missouri
- Oakherst Place Concrete Block District, St. Louis, Missouri, National Register of Historic Places listings in St. Louis, Missouri
