= Beverly Theater =

Beverly Theater or Beverly Theatre may refer to:

- Beverly Hills Playhouse, an acting school and playhouse with theaters
- Beverly Theatre (Beverly Hills, California), a former theater
- Beverly Theater (University City, Missouri), a former theater
- Beverly Theater (Las Vegas, Nevada), an independent movie theater
- Warner Beverly Hills Theater, a former theater
