= Manchester United (disambiguation) =

Manchester United F.C. is a professional association football club based in Greater Manchester, England.

Manchester United may also refer to:

- Manchester United W.F.C., the women's division of the football club based in Leigh, Greater Manchester, England
- Manchester 62 F.C. (formerly Manchester United), a Gibraltarian football club
- Maestro United Zambia F.C. (formerly Manchester United Zambian Academy Football Club)
- Manchester Eagles (formerly Manchester United), a defunct English basketball team once owned by the football club
- Manchester United (video game series), starting in 1990
- "Manchester United" (song), a 1976 song by Manchester United F.C.

== See also ==
- F.C. United of Manchester, a football club founded in Manchester in 2005 by former Manchester United supporters
- Manchester United Radio, a defunct sports radio station run by the football club
- Manchester United Premier Cup, a youth football tournament established by Nike in 1993
- Manchester United FC Halt, a railway station operated 1935 to 2017
- Manchester United Methodist Church, a United Methodist church in Manchester, Missouri, United States
