= John W. Barker =

American historian (1933–2019)

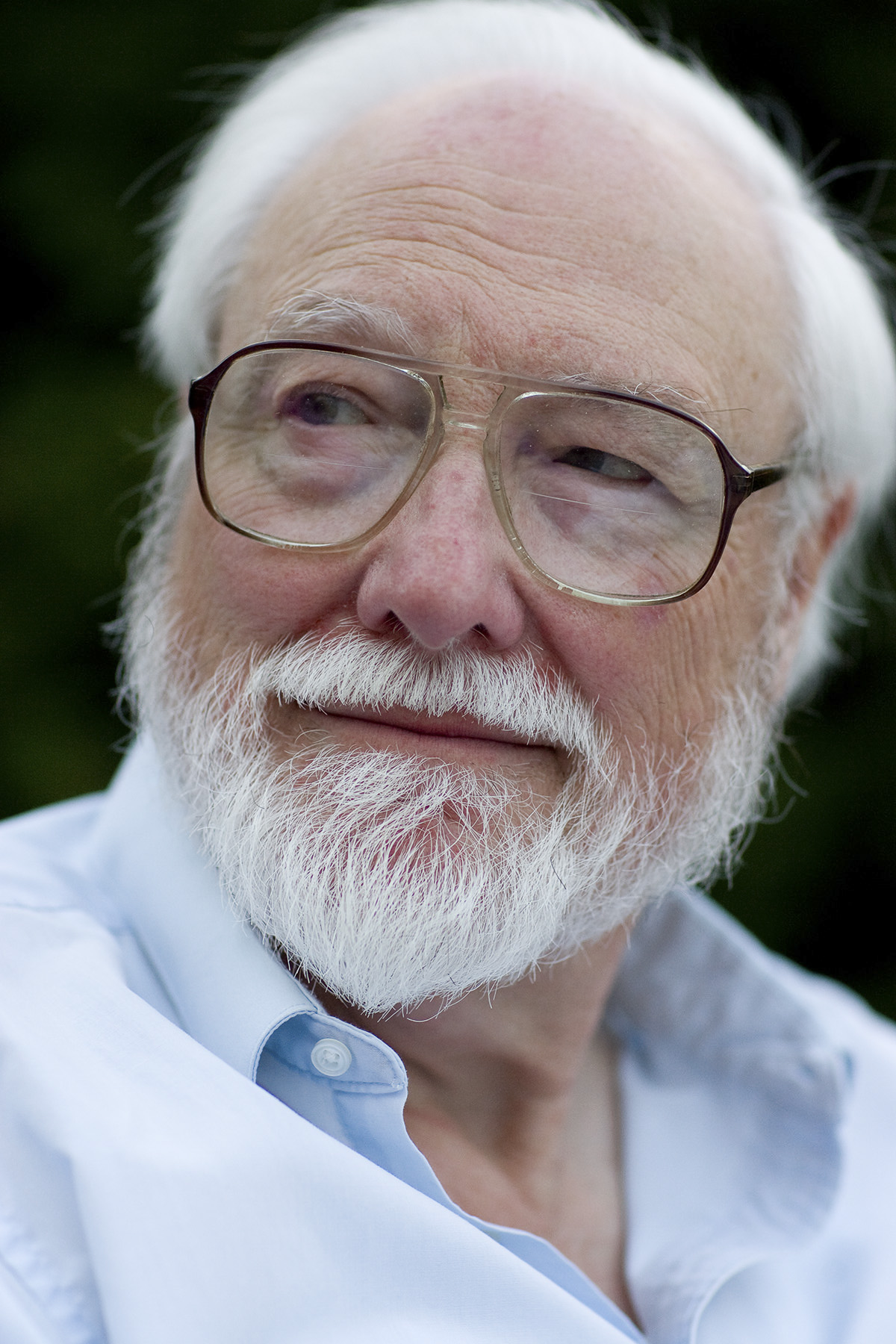
- Born: John Walton Barker; October 7, 1933; Brooklyn, New York, U.S.
- Died: October 24, 2019 (aged 86); Madison, Wisconsin, U.S.
- Spouse: Margaret (née Grabowski)

Academic background
- Education: Brooklyn College (BA); Rutgers University (MA, PhD)

Academic work
- Discipline: Historian
- Main interests: Byzantine History and Classical Music

John Walton Barker (October 7, 1933 – October 24, 2019) was an American historian and specialist in Byzantine history and classical music.

He was the author of a number of works on Byzantine history, including Justinian and the Later Roman Empire (1966) and Manuel II Palaeologus: 1391-1425: A study in late Byzantine Statesmanship (1969). Later in his career, he also wrote books on Richard Wagner: Wagner and Venice (2008), Wagner and Venice Fictionalized: Variations on a Theme (2012).

== Biography ==
John Walton Barker was born in Brooklyn, New York on October 7, 1933, to John W. (Jack) Barker and Evelyn Doty Barker. He was descended from Mayflower bond servant Edward Doty through his mother's ancestors, while on his father's side from a Virginia-originated, Kentucky-based family of tobacco plantation owners. His ancestors fought in the Revolutionary and Civil Wars, during the latter on the side of the Confederacy.

Barker graduated from Brooklyn College in 1955, received his M.A. (1956) and Ph.D. (1961) at Rutgers University and spent three fellowship years (1959–62) at Harvard's Dumbarton Oaks in Washington, D.C. before joining the faculty of the History Department at the University of Wisconsin–Madison, where he served until retirement in 1999. He was dedicated to the history of Medieval Europe, with teaching and research specialities in Byzantine, the Crusades, as well as Venetian history and civilization. In 1975 he helped found the Byzantine Studies Conference (now the Byzantine Studies Association of North America), which continues to be the main venue for presenting current research on Byzantine studies in the western hemisphere. He hosted the second Byzantine Studies Conference in 1976 and the 23rd in 1997. He and his wife traveled extensively and, for a good decade, he led educational tours to Turkey, Greece, Italy, and especially Sicily.

Barker was a devoted connoisseur of classical music, especially opera and oratorio, with a particular devotion to the oratorios of Handel. He was a reviewer for the American Record Guide for 62 years and collected over 110,000 classical music recordings. He wrote extensive music criticism for local Madison journals, and since 2001 was a staff reviewer for Isthmus. For over three decades he was a regular broadcaster on recorded music for WHA/WERN Public Radio, and for the past 18 years was a monthly host on WORT's "Musica Antiqua". He was a co-founder of UW Opera Props and between 1981 and 2006 produced 61 issues of “The Prompter,” extended journals for the university opera productions. In addition, he sang in several local choirs including the choir at the Assumption Greek Orthodox Church in Madison for 47 years.

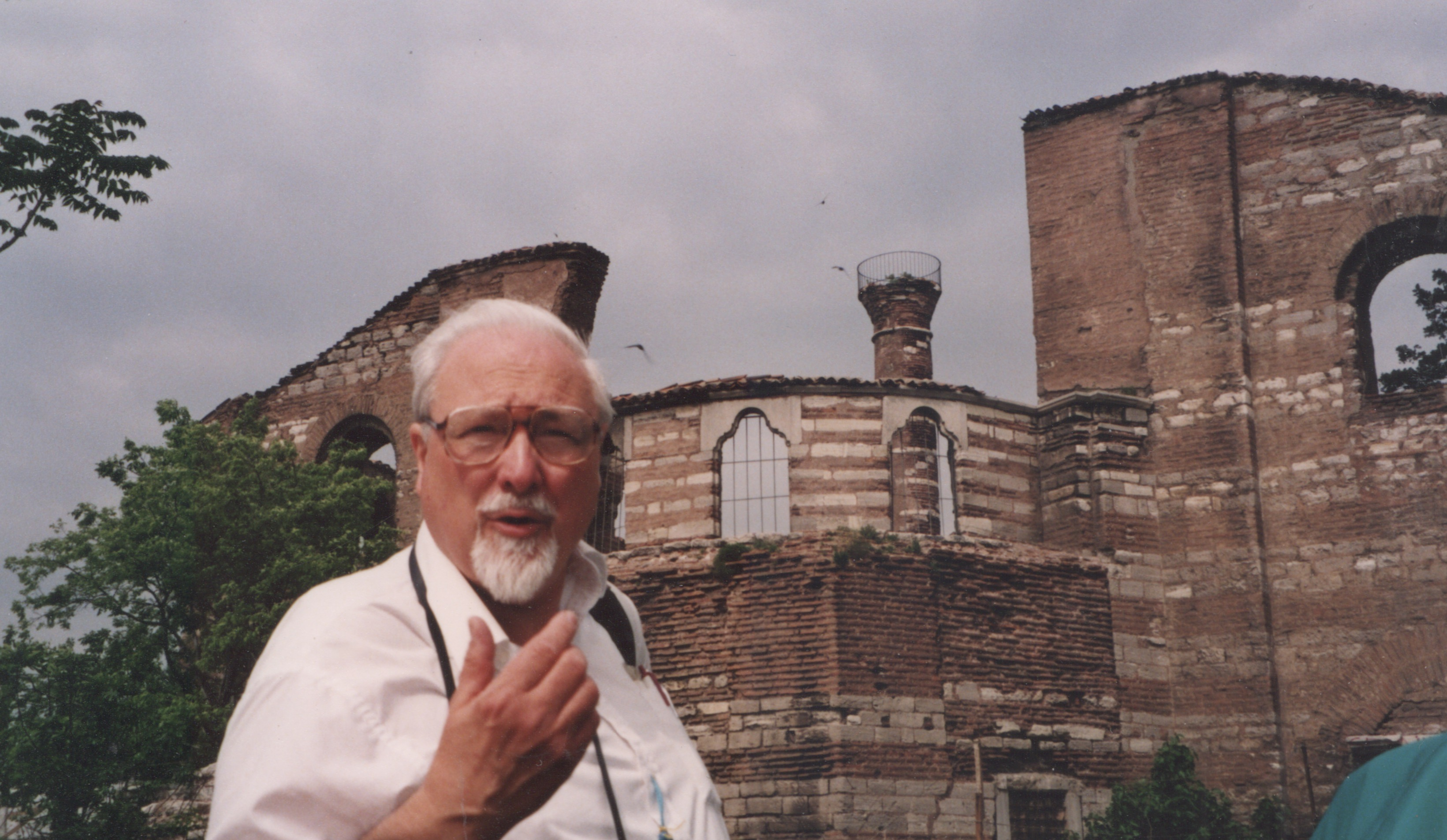
Lecturing at the Monastery of Stoudios (Imrahor Mosque), Istanbul in May 1993

Barker was married to Margaret B. Barker (born Grabowski), a retired attorney and author of non-fiction works. He is buried in the Coughlin family plot at Green-Wood Cemetery, Brooklyn, where he joins his ancestor Thomas Joralemon (c. 1776–1850) and where his neighbors include Leonard Bernstein, Louis Moreau Gottschalk, as well as other notables.

== Selected works ==
- Justinian and the later Roman Empire. Madison: University of Wisconsin Press, 1966.
- Manuel II Palaeologus: 1391–1425: A Study in Late Byzantine Statesmanship. New Brunswick: Rutgers University Press, 1969.
- The use of music and recordings for teaching about the Middle Ages: A practical guide, with comprehensive discography and selective bibliography. Kalamazoo, Michigan: Medieval Institute Publications, 1988.
- Medieval Italy: An Encyclopedia (Edited with Christopher Kleinhenz). New York: Routledge, 2004.
- Wagner and Venice. Rochester: Rochester University Press, 2008.
- Wagner and Venice fictionalized: Variations on a theme. Rochester: Rochester University Press, 2012.
- The Pro Arte Quartet: A Century of Musical Adventure on Two Continents. Rochester: Rochester University Press, 2017.
