= Congregation B'nai Amoona =

- Location in Missouri

Religion
- Affiliation: Conservative Judaism
- Ecclesiastical or organisational status: Synagogue
- Leadership: Rabbi Jeffrey Abraham; Rabbi Bernard Lipnick (Emeritus); Rabbi Jared Skoff, Asst Rabbi; Cantor Sharon Nathanson
- Year consecrated: 1882 (144 years ago)
- Status: Active

Location
- Location: 324 South Mason Road, Creve Coeur, Missouri
- Country: United States
- Coordinates: 38°39′03″N 90°28′42″W

Architecture
- Established: 1882 (as a congregation)
- Groundbreaking: 1981 (45 years ago)
- Completed: 1986 (40 years ago)

Website
- bnaiamoona.com

Congregation B'nai Amoona is an egalitarian Conservative synagogue, located at 324 South Mason Road, Creve Coeur, Missouri, in the United States. It evolved from a small Orthodox congregation of primarily German-speaking members into an English-speaking Conservative congregation.

== Overview ==
The congregation is an egalitarian (i.e. men and women have religious equality) synagogue affiliated with Masorti Judaism.

The congregation offers programming for families and young adults. The B'nai Amoona Religious School teaches extracurricular Hebrew and religious studies and the Early Childhood Center offers programs for infants through pre-kindergarten. Day Camps, B'nai Ami and Ramot Amoona, modeled after Camp Ramah, are available in the summer. B'nai Amoona and the Saul Mirowitz Jewish Day School [formerly the Solomon Schechter Day School] are housed on the same campus.

B'nai Amoona is the only Conservative synagogue in St. Louis that maintains its own cemetery, located in University City, Missouri.

The congregation has approximately 800 families including interfaith couples.

== History ==
In 1882 some members of Sheerith Israel, St. Louis's largest Orthodox congregation, left to form a new congregation which by 1884 was led by Rabbi Arron Levy. From 1882 to 1888, it rented halls to hold services.

In January 1885 Levy was succeeded by 26-year-old Rabbi Rosentreter, newly arrived from Berlin. The first public notice of the new congregation appeared in the St. Louis Post-Dispatch on August 15, 1884, as follows:

A concert for the benefit of the Rev. Aaron Levy, the Jewish rabbi whose congregation seceded recently from Sheerith Israel Church, will be given at Druid's Hall, August 17. The congregation now worships regularly at Pohlman's Hall Broadway and Franklin Avenue, under the name B'nei Emounoh which means "Sons of Faith".

From 1888 to 1906 the synagogue was located at 13th and Carr. In 1893 the B'nai Amoona Cemetery was established.

From 1949 to 1985, it was at 524 Trinity Avenue in Creve Coeur, Missouri, a building on the National Register of Historic Places listings in St. Louis County, Missouri since 1984.

The synagogue is associated with the United Synagogue of Conservative Judaism.

== Services and Clergy ==
The congregation maintains daily services with a minyan (minimum congregation of ten Jews) every day of the week. The clergy consists of Senior Rabbi, Jeffrey Abraham and Assistant Rabbi, Jared Skoff. Sharon Nathanson serves as Hazzan

== Youth Camps ==
The congregation maintains two summer camps for youth in the St Louis community, based on age. They are Ramot Amoona for older children and B'nai Ami for preschool children.

== See also ==
- Religion in Missouri
