= Joseph Sappington House =

Historic house in Missouri, United States

- U.S. National Register of Historic Places
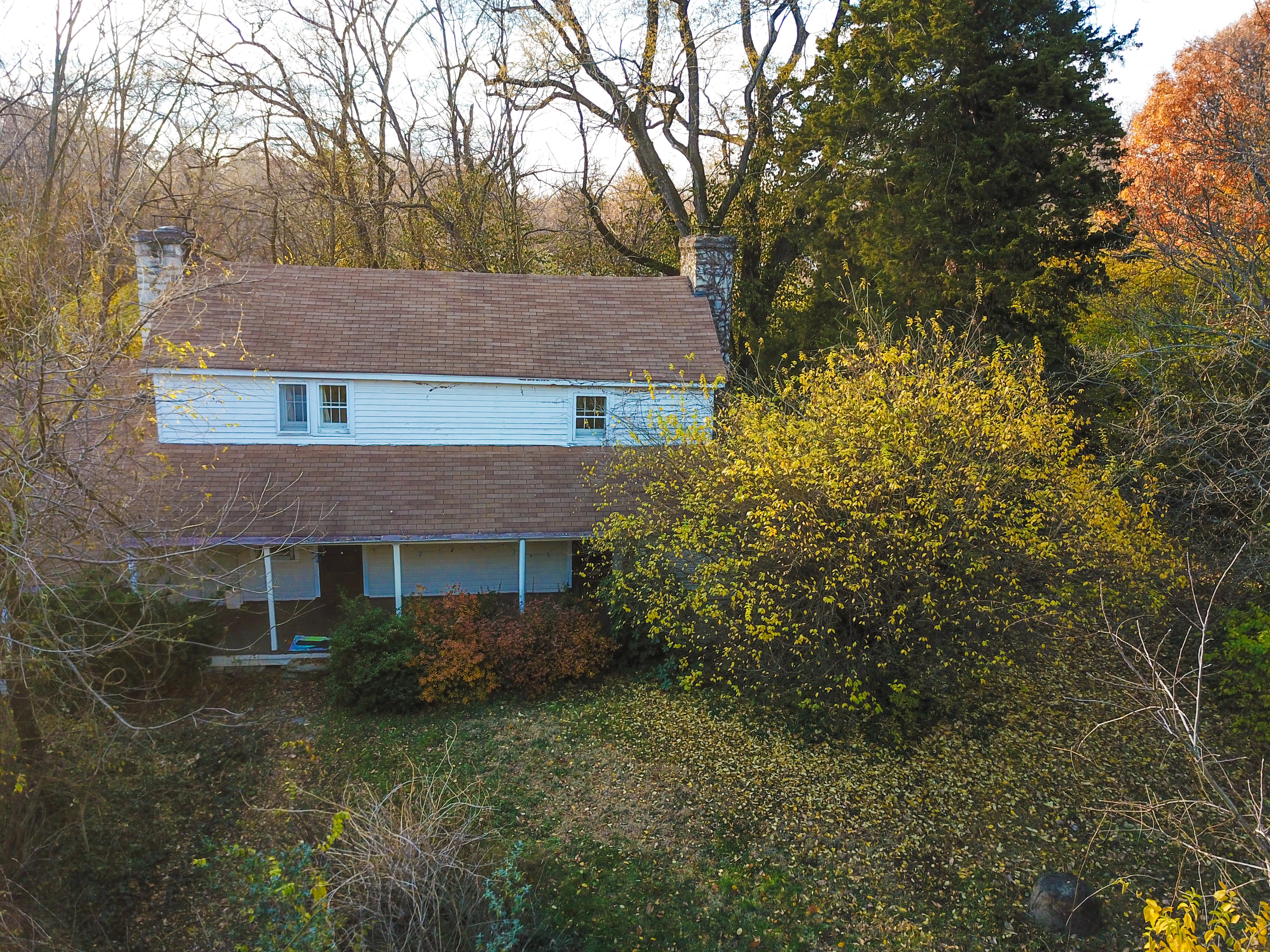
- Joseph Sappington House in 2017

- Location within Missouri Location within the United States
- Location: 10734 Clearwater Drive, Crestwood, Missouri 63123
- Coordinates: 38°32′15″N 90°21′21″W
- Built: 1816
- NRHP reference No.: 82000589
- Added to NRHP: October 14, 1982

The Joseph Sappington House is a building on the National Register of Historic Places (NRHP) that was built around 1816. It was built for Joseph Sappington, a relative of John Sappington who was a prominent figure in early St. Louis. It is located near Crestwood, Missouri and was added to the NRHP in 1982. The house was saved from demolition by the developer partnering with the City of Crestwood and the Sappington House Foundation. The house was disassembled in 2023 and will be rebuilt inside Sappington Park next to the 1808 brick home of Thomas Sappington, Joseph's cousin.

== History ==
The Sappington family was a large family in early St. Louis. The patriarch, John Sappington, had seventeen children, although Joseph Sappington was not one of them. Joseph Sappington was likely the cousin or nephew of John Sappington, and he was one of the witnesses to John Sappington's will in 1815.

The Joseph Sappington House is one of five pioneer houses in the Crestwood area, and was the last to be nominated on the NRHP. These houses were built in 1820 or earlier. The house was built around a minor tributary of Gravois Creek, and is located about one mile southeast of Crestwood, Missouri.

== Architecture ==
The house is a two-story building that faces east and is originally made from logs. However, the house has been clapboarded on the exterior. Furthermore, the house had been whitewashed multiple times throughout its history, and plaster was placed over visible logs. It is likely that the house was built in multiple phases. The interior was renovated started in 1953, and it was restored to reflect its original state. The house has three log rooms that each have their own chimney.

== See also ==
- National Register of Historic Places listings in St. Louis County, Missouri
