= Cold Water Cemetery =

Historic cemetery in St. Louis County, Missouri

- U.S. National Register of Historic Places
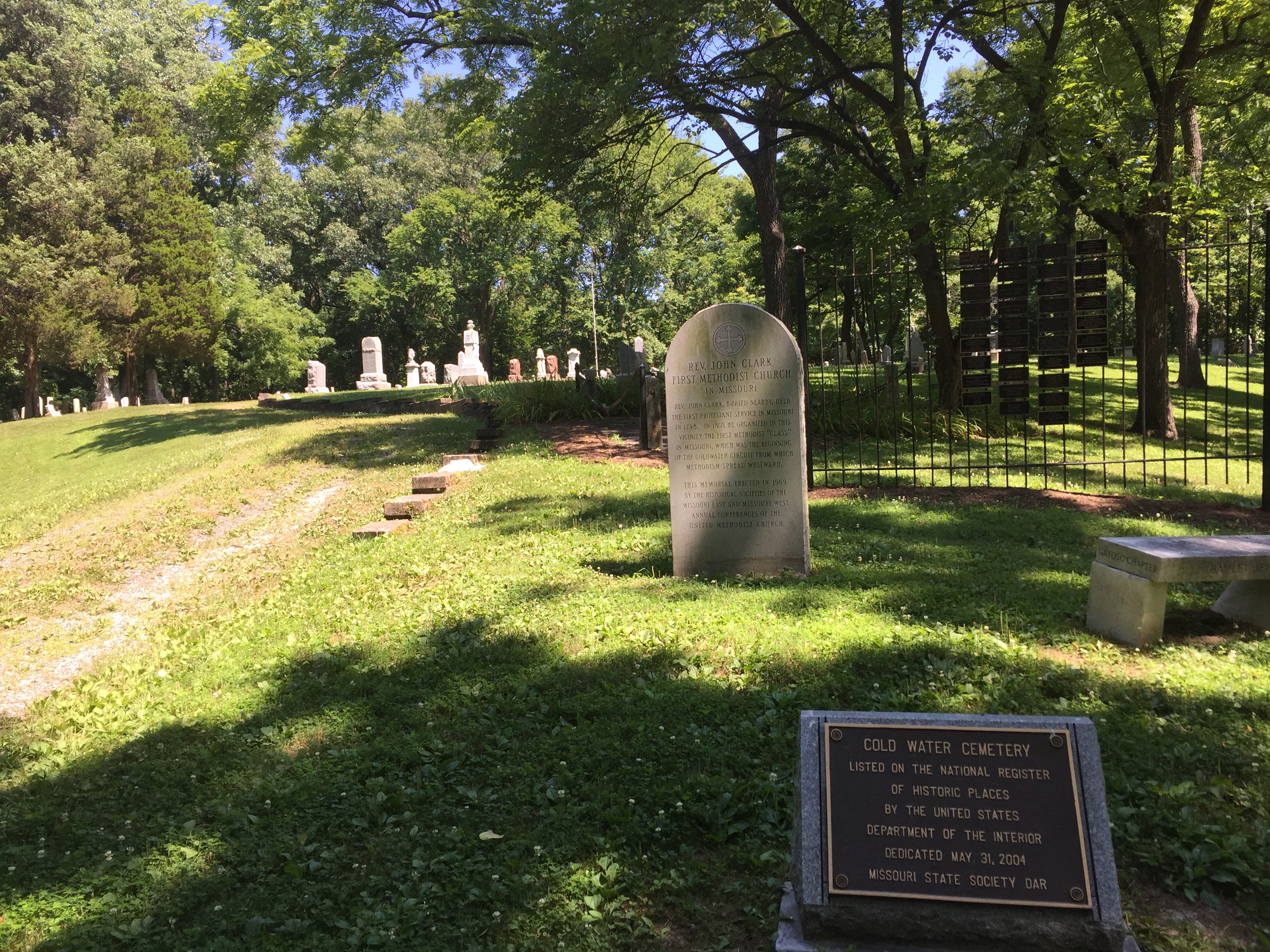
- Location: 15290 Old Halls Ferry Road; Florissant, Missouri 63034
- Coordinates: 38°50′03″N 90°17′00″W
- Area: 2 acres (0.81 ha)
- Built: c. 1809
- NRHP reference No.: 04000462
- Added to NRHP: May 19, 2004

Cold Water Cemetery, originally the Patterson family burial ground, is a historic cemetery located at 15290 Old Halls Ferry Road in Old Jamestown in what was known as the Sinks, near Florissant, St. Louis County, Missouri. The cemetery is 2 acres and was historically most active between 1809 and 1929, however, it is still in use. It is owned and managed by the Missouri State Society Daughters of the American Revolution. It is thought to be the oldest Protestant cemetery still in use, west of the Mississippi River.

It has been listed as one of the National Register of Historic Places since May 19, 2004.

== History ==
John Patterson (1760–1839), of Scotch-Irish descent, was a Revolutionary War veteran who had emigrated from North Carolina; in 1797 he received a Spanish land grant in Upper Louisiana. There is conflicting information around the size of the original land grant, with estimates between 600 acres and 1500 acres. The cemetery began as a plot for the Patterson family, with the earliest burial estimated to be in 1809 for John Patterson's wife Keziah Horneday Patterson. Around 1809, a log church was erected on the site, later the first location of Cold Water Church, now Salem Baptist Church. The church is no longer standing, but there is a memorial plaque.

In the 1970s a restoration effort took place to clean up the landscaping and repair broken or misplaced headstones.

== See also ==
- National Register of Historic Places listings in St. Louis County, Missouri
