= Rudolph and Dorothy C. Czufin House =

Historic house in Missouri, United States

- U.S. National Register of Historic Places
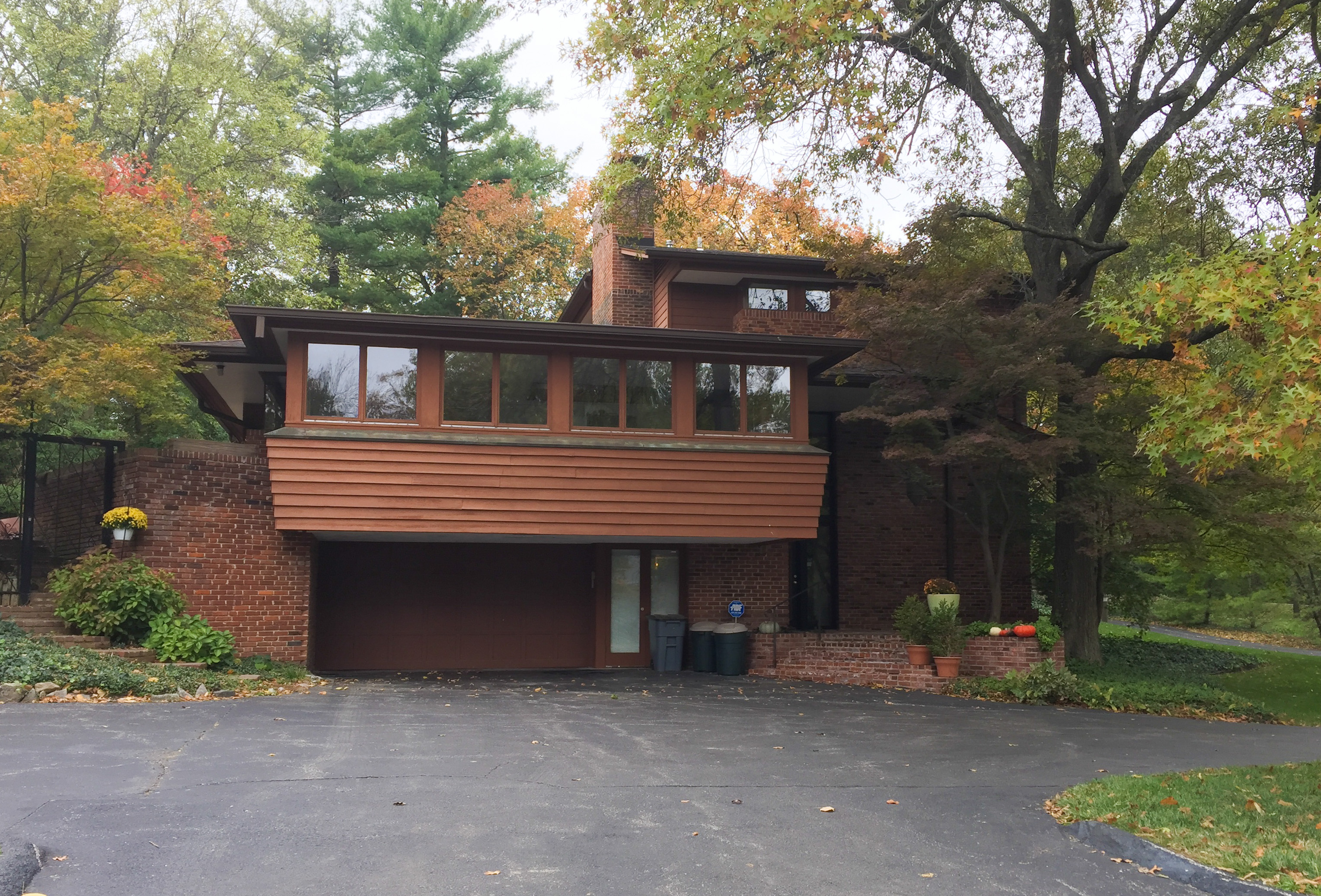
- Rudolph and Dorothy C. Czufin House in 2017

- Location within Missouri Location within the United States
- Location: 24 Dielman Road, Ladue, Missouri
- Coordinates: 38°39′14″N 90°22′32″W
- Area: less than one acre
- Built: 1951
- Architectural style: Modern Movement
- NRHP reference No.: 02000792
- Added to NRHP: July 12, 2002

The Rudolph and Dorothy C. Czufin House is a historic house in Ladue, Missouri, U.S.. It was built in 1950-1951 for Rudolph Czufin and his wife, Dorothy. It was designed by architects William Bernoudy and Edward Jules Mutrux. It has been listed on the National Register of Historic Places since July 12, 2002.
