= Maritz & Young =

Maritz & Young is an architectural firm in Missouri.

Some of their works are listed on the National Register of Historic Places.

- Balmer & Weber Music House Co. Building, 1004 Olive St. St. Louis, Missouri, NRHP-listed
- Westwood Country Club, clubhouse in Westwood, Missouri
- One or more works in NRHP-listed Carrswold Historic District, Clayton, Missouri
- One or more works in NRHP-listed Wydown-Forsyth District, Clayton and St. Louis, Missouri
- One of more works in NRHP-listed Brentmoor Park, Brentmoor and Forest Ridge District, Clayton, Missouri
