= National Register of Historic Places listings in St. Louis =

National Register of Historic Places listings in the city of St. Louis are compiled in the following lists:

- National Register of Historic Places listings in Downtown and Downtown West St. Louis (133 listings)
- National Register of Historic Places listings in St. Louis north and west of downtown (191 listings)
- National Register of Historic Places listings in St. Louis south and west of downtown (115 listings)

== See also ==
- National Register of Historic Places listings in St. Louis County, Missouri, around but not in the city
