= Carrswold Historic District =

- U.S. National Register of Historic Places
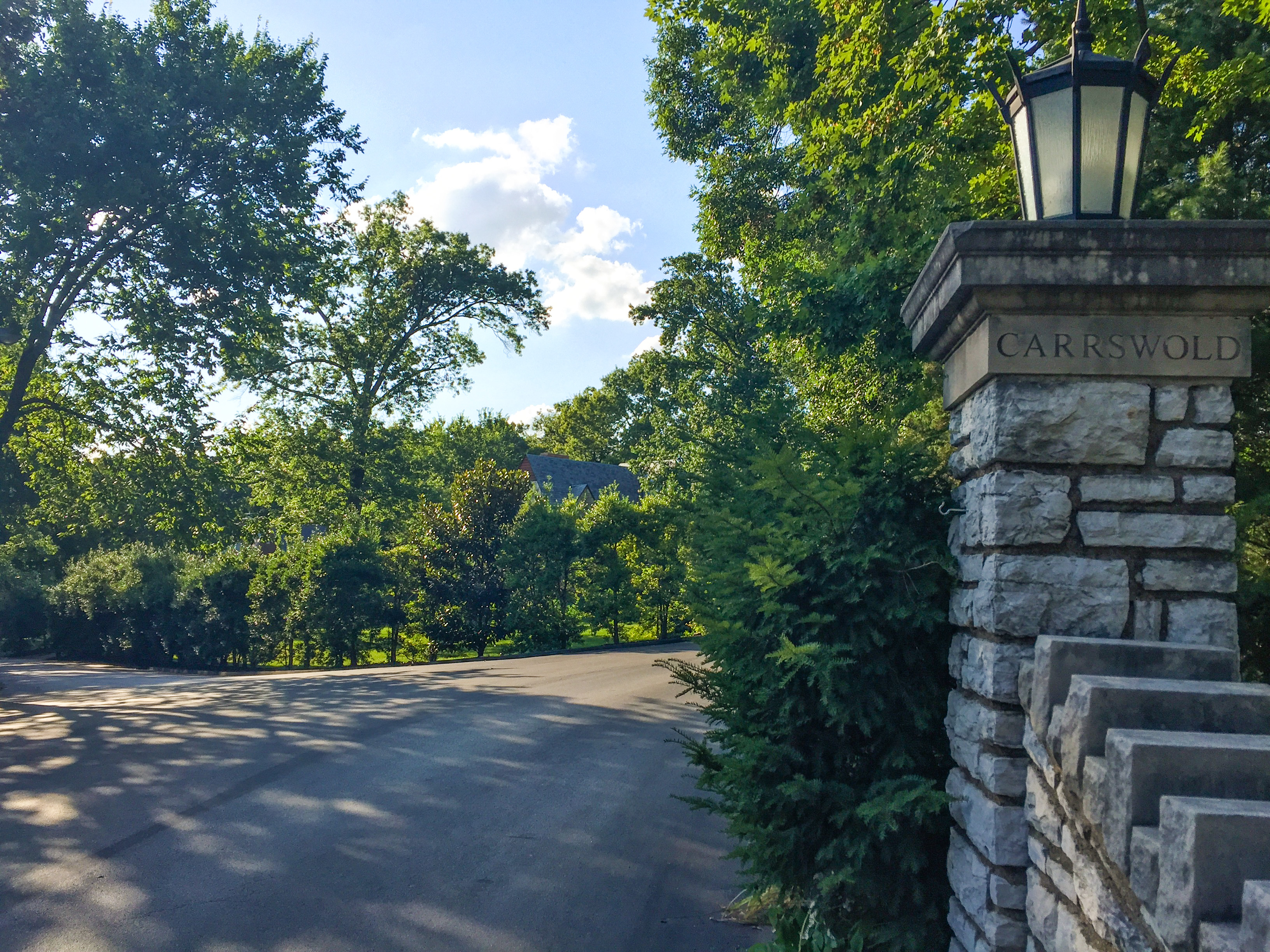

- Location within Missouri Location within the United States
- Location: Carrswold Drive, north of Wydown Boulevard and east of Hanley Road, Clayton, Missouri
- Coordinates: 38°38′42″N 90°19′46″W
- Area: 35 acres (14 ha)
- Built: 1922-24
- Built by: Multiple
- Architectural style: Colonial Revival, Tudor Revival, Georgian Revival
- NRHP reference No.: 82004889
- Added to NRHP: September 9, 1982

The Carrswold Historic District is a historic district in Clayton, Missouri. The district comprises a subdivision patterned after the garden city movement containing 23 single-family homes built between 1922 and 1924, which are located on Carrswold Drive on the north side of Wydown Boulevard. It was listed on the National Register of Historic Places in 1982.

Carrswold was designed by Danish-born landscape architect Jens Jensen and was built on the former estate of St. Louis businessman Robert E. Carr, for which the subdivision was named. Jensen originally landscaped the community with native greenery and plant species, including hawthorn, sumac, and crabapple trees. Jensen also enacted several covenants, including prohibiting fences, front-facing garages, and any house or structure built in the California bungalow style.

The entrance to the neighborhood is marked by stone pillars topped with lights, as well as a stone pavilion which served as a waiting area for the streetcar that formerly ran down Wydown Boulevard. The neighborhood's street is laid out in a large oval shape that contains common areas jointly owned by the residents. Of the 23 homes in the neighborhood, 15 were designed by the architecture firm Maritz & Young in styles including Colonial Revival, Georgian Revival, and Tudor Revival.

== Gallery ==
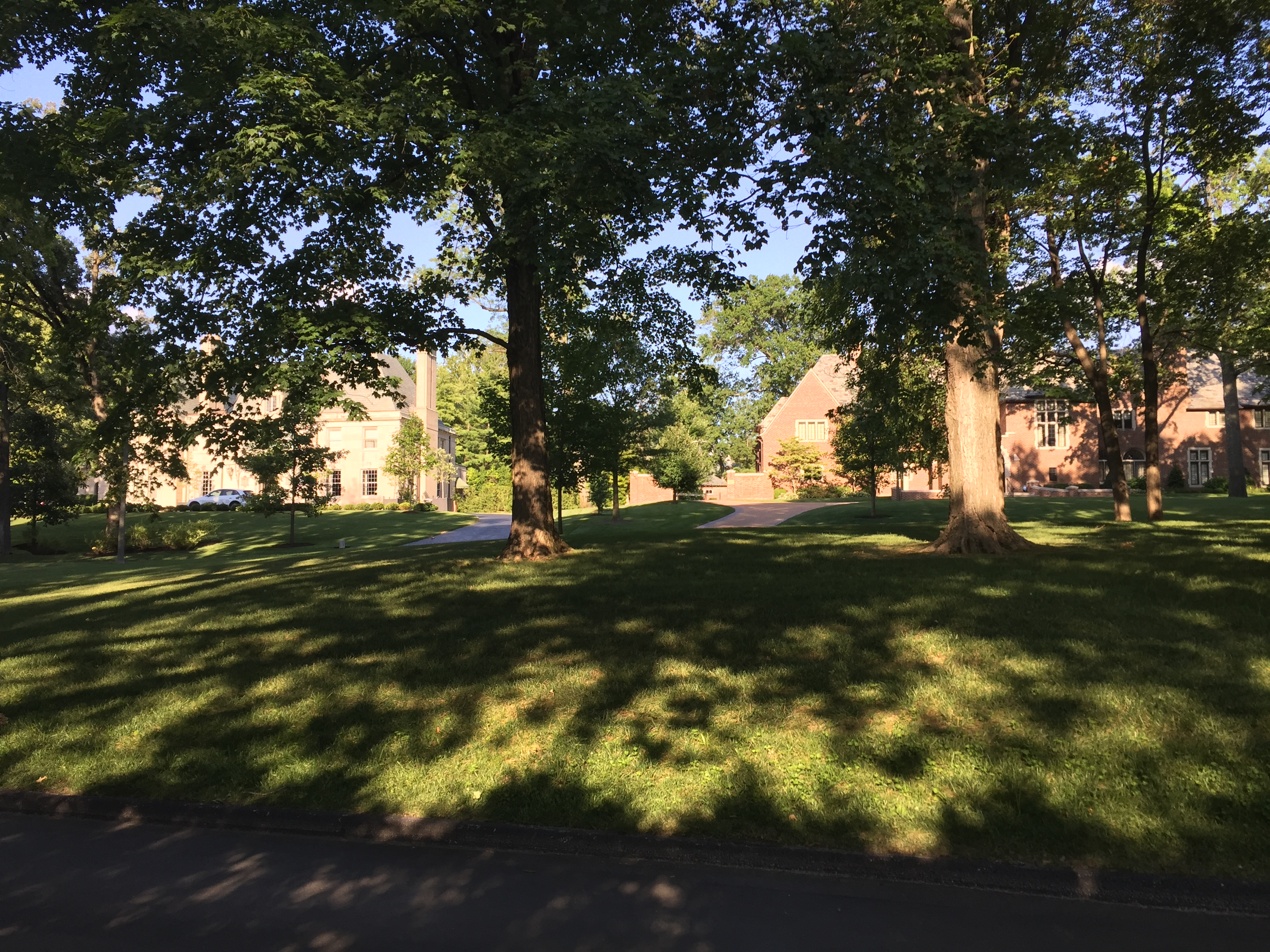
Homes along Carrswold Drive

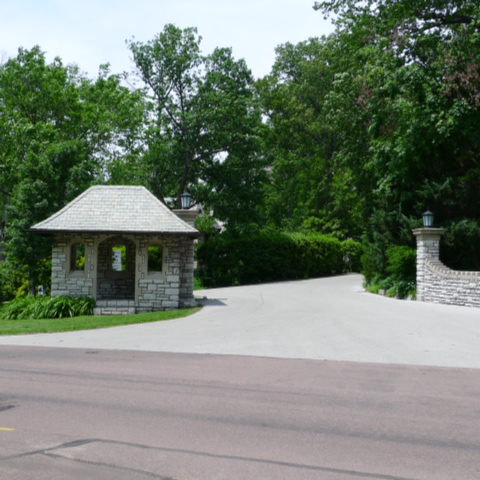
Entrance to Carrswold off Wydown Boulevard

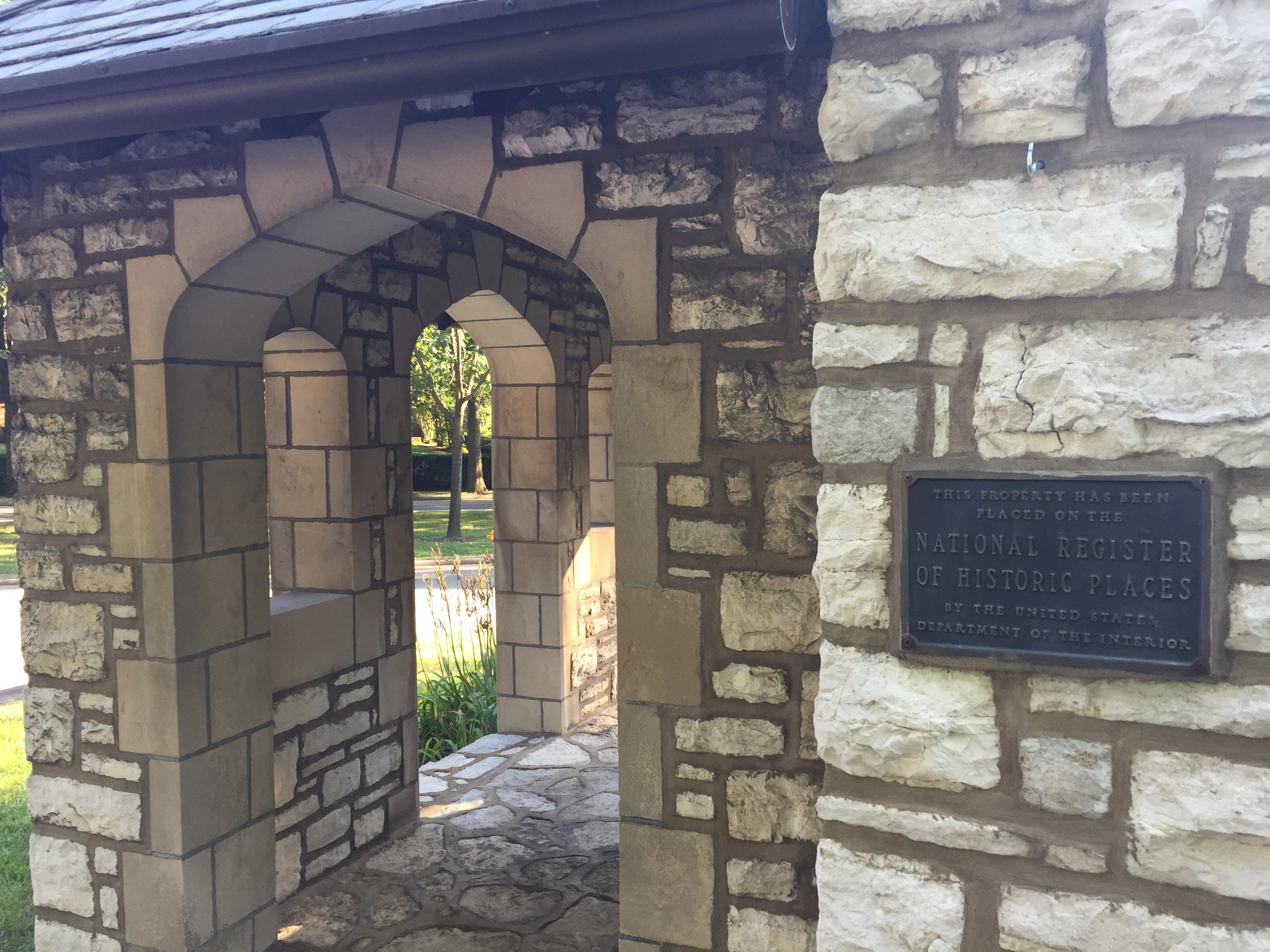
Closeup of historical marker
