= Hubecky House =

Historic house in Missouri, United States

- U.S. National Register of Historic Places
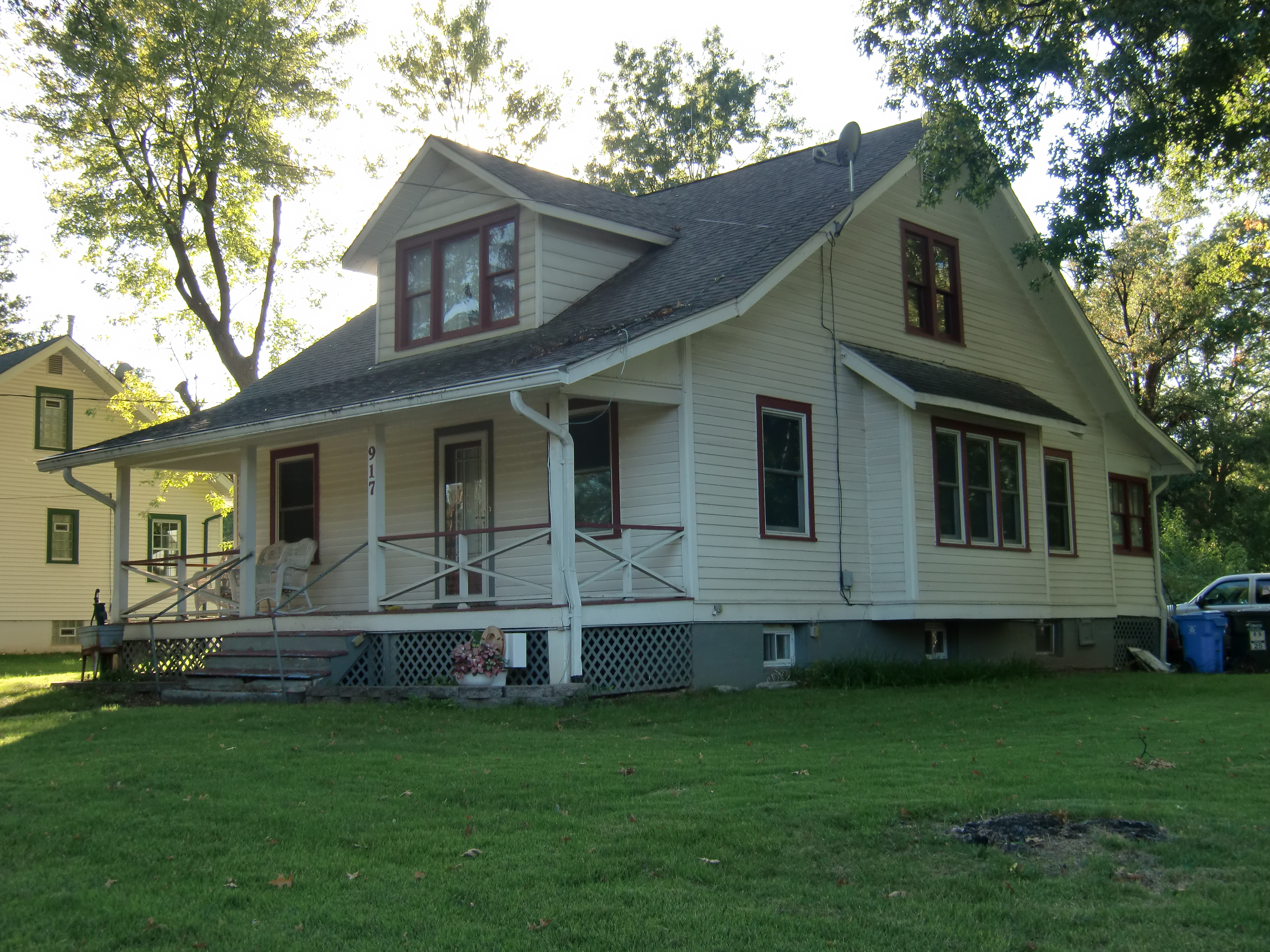
- House in 2012

- Location within Missouri Location within the United States
- Location: 917 Lafayette, Florissant, Missouri
- Coordinates: 38.79624°N 90.32341°W
- Area: less than one acre44
- Built: 1922
- Architectural style: Missouri French
- MPS: St. Ferdinand City MRA
- NRHP reference No.: 79003674
- Added to NRHP: September 12, 1979

The Hubecky House in Florissant, Missouri is a historic house located at 917 Lafayette.

It was built in 1922. It has "plaster walls, millwork and pine floors", In 1978, its exterior was weatherboard and its roof was asbestos shingles. It is perhaps best described as "Bungalow with French Affinities", a term applied to the adjacent, similar Meyer House.

In the 1970s the area of St. Ferdinand was assessed for its historic resources, leading to the listing in 1979 of the Hubecky House and many other houses, buildings, and historic districts on the National Register of Historic Places.

The Hubecky House was deemed "Significant as an example of the continuity of the Missouri French style of architecture, which helps make this Multiple Resource Area a cohesive entity."

Also the MRA document describes: "This frame Missouri French example helps define the type and represents the renaissance of this style in this town in the 1920's and 1930's."

The Missouri French style was "a trademark of Florissant's residential architecture since 1790", and 16 examples including the Hubecky House were assessed to be "of considerable local architectural importance in spite of their simple designs."

It was a home of William F. Hubecky (1930-2004), a postman.

== See also ==
- Meyer House (Florissant, Missouri), next door at 915 N. Lafayette, also NRHP-listed in Florissant
- St. Ferdinand Central Historic District, two blocks away, roughly bounded by rue St. Francois, rue St. Ferdinand, and rue St. Denis, and Lafayette St., also NRHP-listed in Florissant
