= Meyer House (Florissant, Missouri) =

Historic house in Missouri, United States

- U.S. National Register of Historic Places
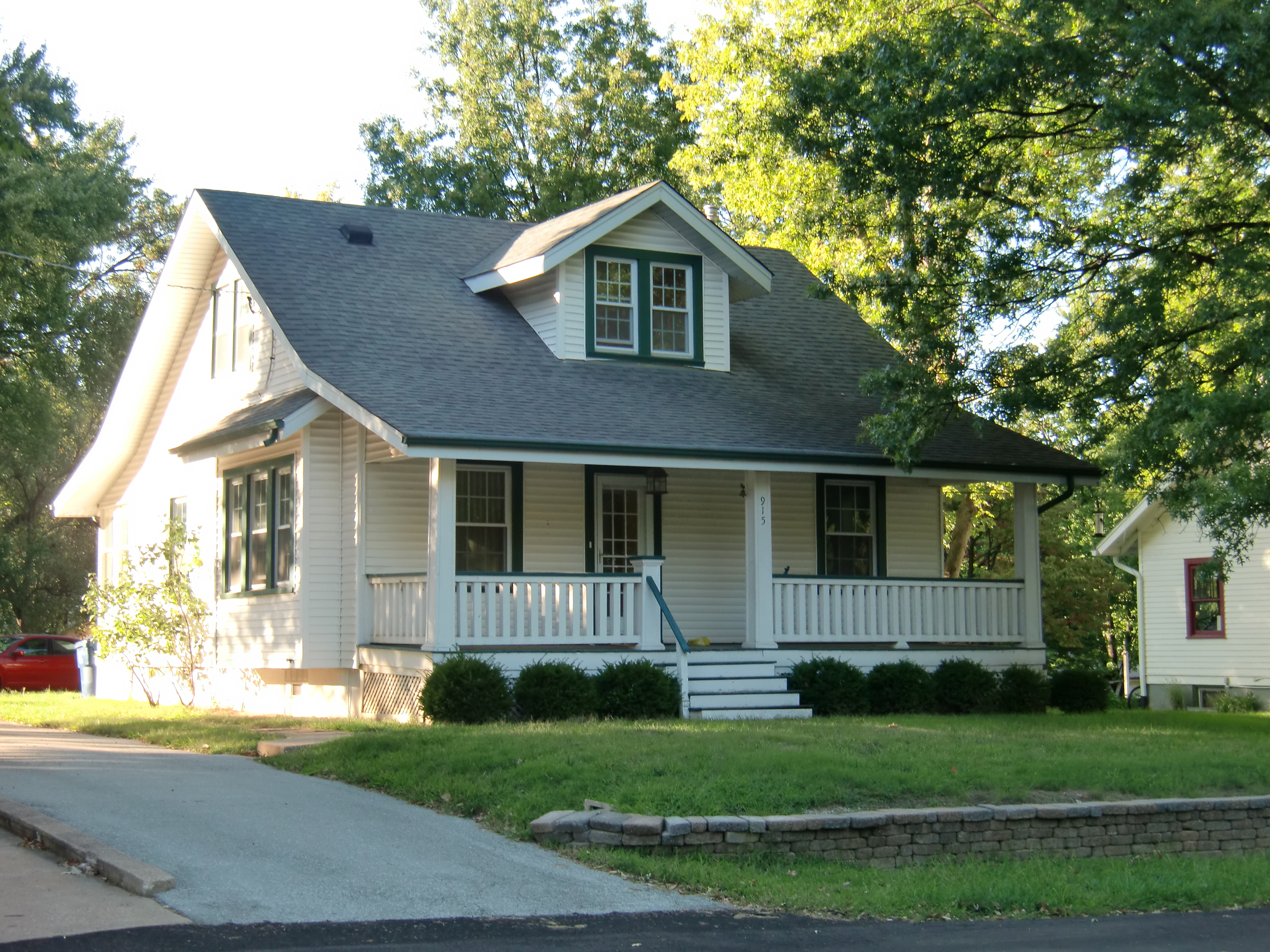
- House in 2012

- Location within Missouri Location within the United States
- Location: 915 Lafayette, Florissant, Missouri, United States
- Coordinates: 38.79606°N 90.32353°W
- Area: less than one acre
- Built: 1922
- Architectural style: Bungalow/craftsman, Missouri French
- MPS: St. Ferdinand City MRA
- NRHP reference No.: 79003658
- Added to NRHP: September 12, 1979

The Meyer House in Florissant, Missouri is a historic house located at 915 Lafayette.

Meyer House was built in 1922. It is described as "Bungalow with French Affinities". In 1978, its exterior was weatherboard and its roof was asphalt shingles.

In the 1970s the area of St. Ferdinand was assessed for its historic resources, leading to the listing in 1979 of the Hubecky House and many other houses, buildings, and historic districts on the National Register of Historic Places.

As was the adjacent Hubecky House, the Meyer House was deemed "Significant as an example of the continuity of the Missouri French style of architecture, which helps make this Multiple Resource Area a cohesive entity."

Also the MRA document describes the Meyer House: "This frame Missouri French example illustrates the temporal continuity of this style and helps define its Florissant manifestations. It represents the renaissance of this style here in the 1920's and 1930's."

The Missouri French style was "a trademark of Florissant's residential architecture since 1790", and 16 examples including the Meyer House were assessed to be "of considerable local architectural importance in spite of their simple designs."

== See also ==
- Hubecky House, next door at 917 N. Lafayette, also NRHP-listed in Florissant
- St. Ferdinand Central Historic District, two blocks away, roughly bounded by rue St. Francois, rue St. Ferdinand, and rue St. Denis, and Lafayette St., also NRHP-listed in Florissant
