= Old Stone Church (Chesterfield, Missouri) =

Historic church in Chesterfield, Missouri

- U.S. National Register of Historic Places
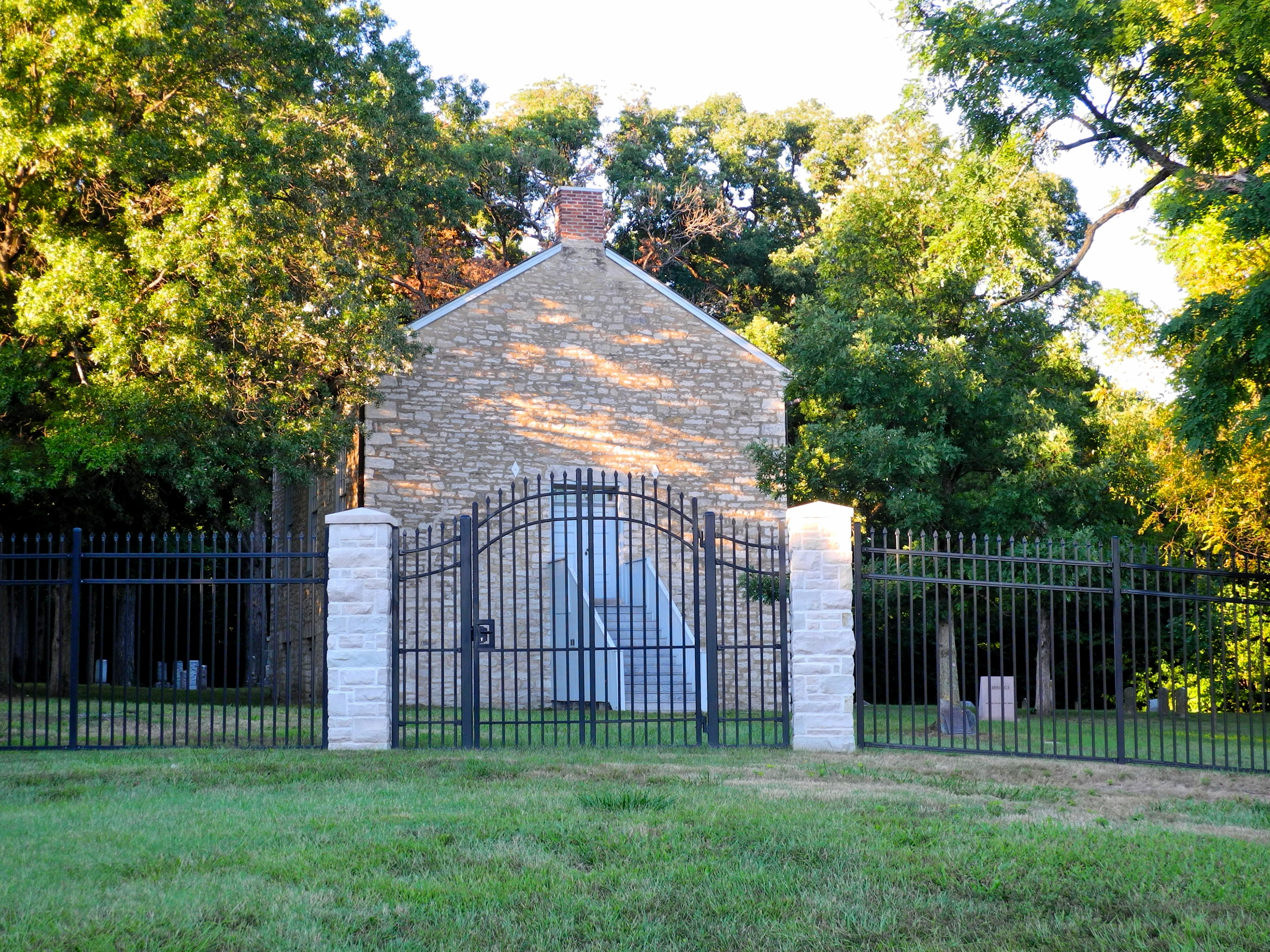

- Location within Missouri Location within the United States
- Location: Conway Rd. across from Hoffman Rd., Chesterfield, Missouri
- Coordinates: 38.6496°N 90.52404°W
- Area: 9.9 acres (4.0 ha)
- Built: 1841
- Built by: James Sappington, John Baxter
- NRHP reference No.: 73002274
- Added to NRHP: April 13, 1973

The Old Stone Church in Chesterfield, Missouri, United States, is a historic church on Conway Road, across from Hoffman Road. It has also been known as Bonhomme Presbyterian Church and as Old Bonhomme Church. It was built in 1841 and added to the National Register of Historic Places in 1973.

It is a rectangular, stone church about 30.25 by 40.4 feet (9.22 m × 12.31 m) in plan. It rises to 37.4 feet (11.4 m) above the ground level.

It was deemed:

significant as an architectural landmark in Missouri, especially in the St. Louis area. Its importance is due to its design and construction materials. The building is also noteworthy as a pioneer church, housing the second Presbyterian congregation organized west of the Mississippi River and the first in the St. Louis area. / The church, with its one-story, full-height basement design, is a rare, unusual example of 1840's church architecture in Missouri. The use of the full-height basement appears to be almost unknown outside St. Louis County, most of the churches being either set directly on the ground level or on very shallow basements. The only other similar example is the First St. Peter's Catholic Church with School in St. Charles, Missouri. (It is interesting to note that these two churches were located in close vicinity of each other). As there appears to be no specific eastern models, it seems that the design was developed out of the necessity for both church and school structures and combining them under one roof for economy reasons.

The referenced St. Peter's Catholic Church is apparently the 1848-started church depicted in a sketch at the parish's history page, which was damaged in 1861 and replaced.

It is located at a "no outlet" short roadway off Conway Road, across from (and perhaps also named) Hoffman Rd. At the time of NRHP listing, it was described as being on Conway Road at White Road, but since then a small development has been put in between it and White Road.
