= Wydown-Forsyth District =

Historic district in Missouri, United States

- Wydown--Forsyth District
- U.S. National Register of Historic Places
- U.S. Historic district
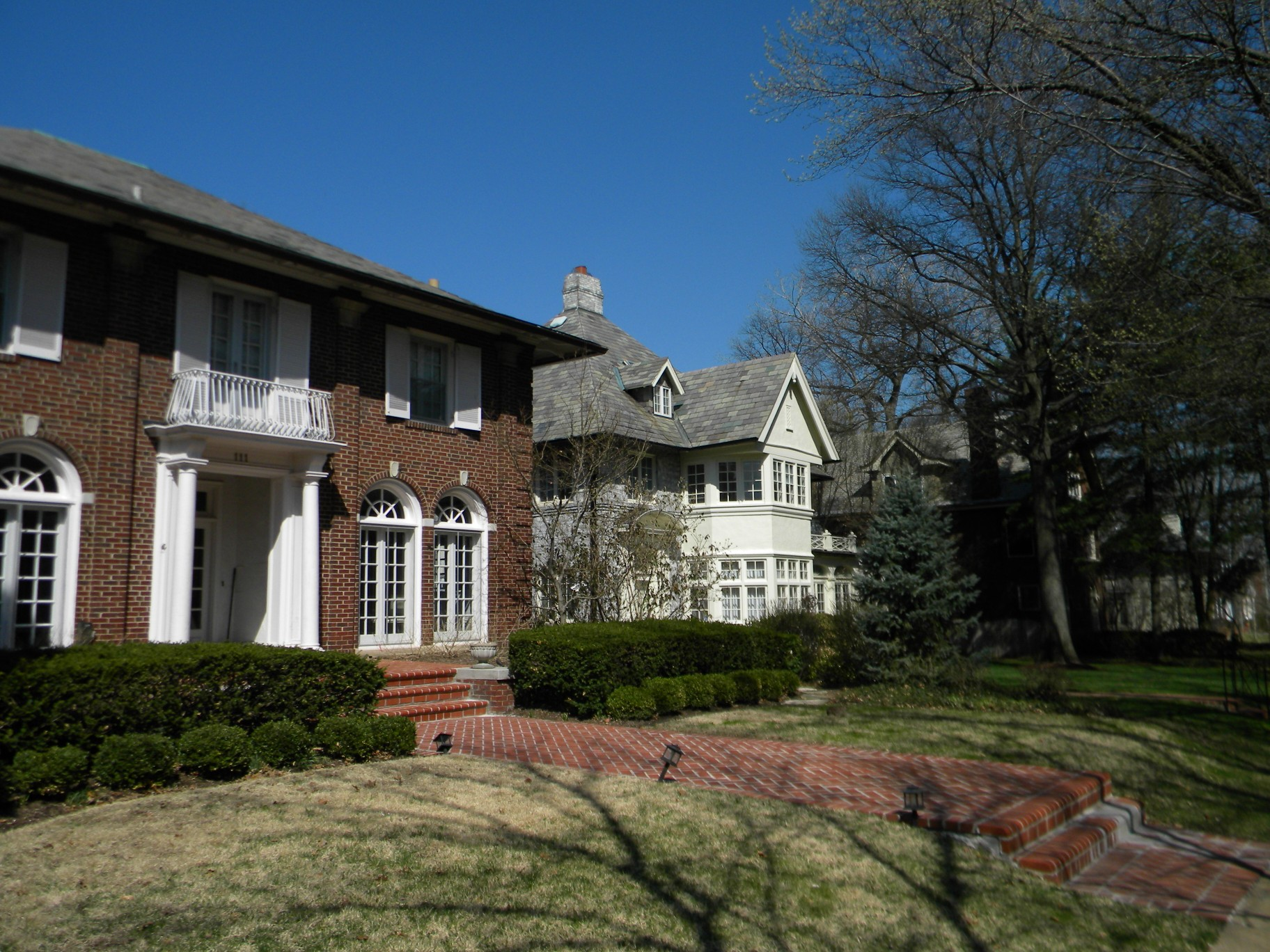

- Location within Missouri Location within the United States
- Location: Roughly bounded by Forsyth, Skinker Blvd., Fauquier and Wydown Terrace Dr., and University Ln., Clayton, Missouri
- Coordinates: 38°38′38″N 90°18′25″W
- Area: 122 acres (49 ha)
- Architect: Maritz & Young; Et al.
- Architectural style: Colonial Revival, Late 19th And 20th Century Revivals, Tudor Revival
- NRHP reference No.: 88000628
- Added to NRHP: May 23, 1988

The Wydown-Forsyth District, in Clayton and St. Louis, Missouri, is a 122 acres (49 ha) historic district which was listed on the National Register of Historic Places in 1988. It is roughly bounded by Forsyth, Skinker Blvd., Fauquier and Wydown Terrace Dr., and University Lane. The listing included 236 contributing buildings.

It includes works by Maritz & Young and other architects.
