= Brentmoor Park, Brentmoor and Forest Ridge District =

- U.S. National Register of Historic Places
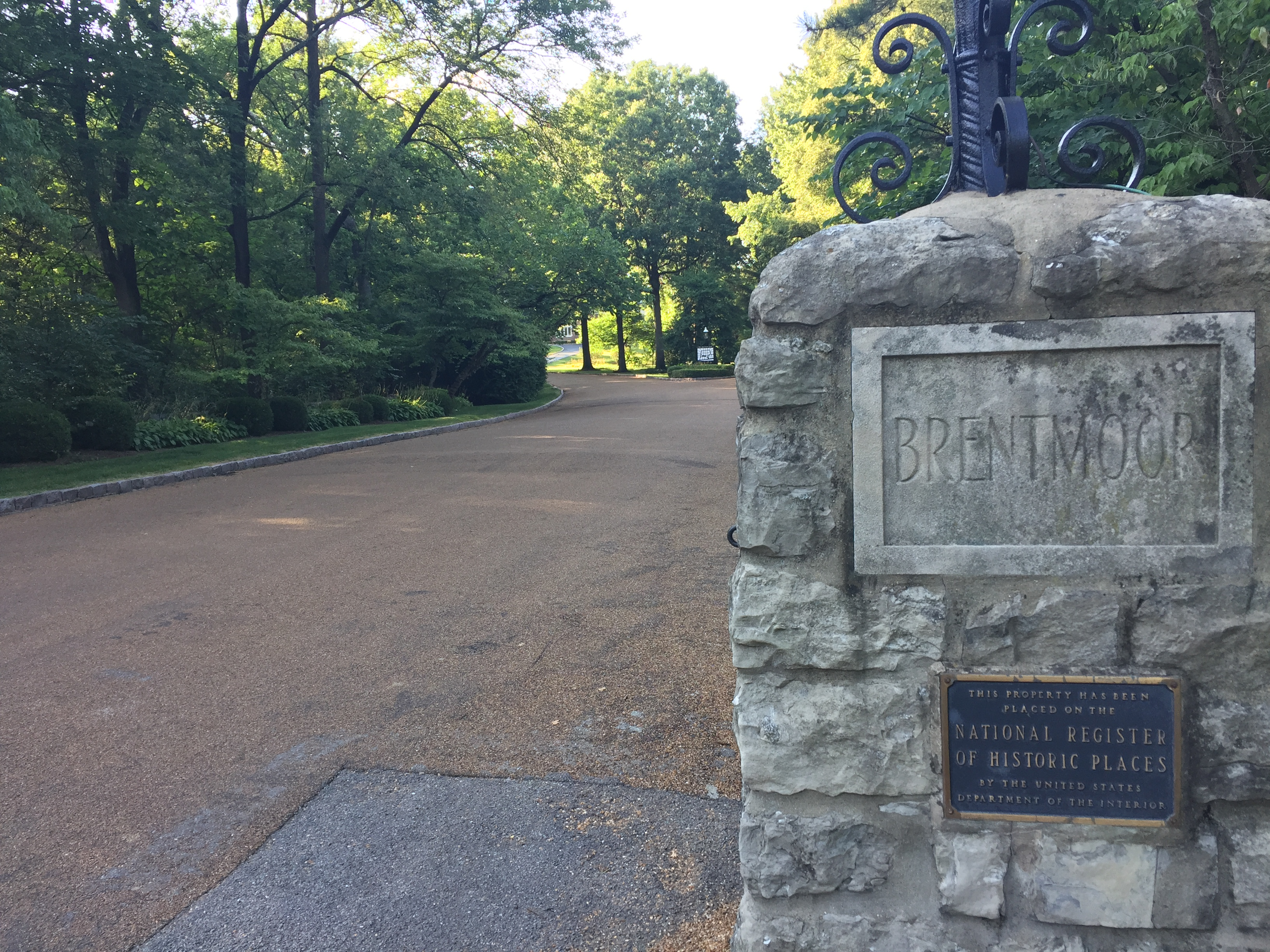
- Entrance to Brentmoor subdivision

- Location within Missouri Location within the United States
- Location: Big Bend and Wydown Boulevards, Clayton, Missouri
- Coordinates: 38°38′36″N 90°19′19″W
- Area: 103.6 acres (41.9 ha)
- Built: 1922-24
- Built by: Multiple
- Architectural style: Colonial Revival, Tudor Revival, Georgian Revival, Regency Revival, Spanish Colonial Revival, Mediterranean Revival
- NRHP reference No.: 82004716
- Added to NRHP: September 23, 1982

The Brentmoor Park, Brentmoor and Forest Ridge District is a historic district comprising three private subdivisions in the city of Clayton, Missouri, a suburb of St. Louis, that were platted in 1910, 1911, and 1913, respectively by Henry Wright. It was listed on the National Register of Historic Places in 1982.

== Description ==
Inspired by the garden city movement, Wright designed all three of the subdivisions to face inward toward their common grounds and away from the noise and congestion of Wydown Boulevard and the streetcar line which formerly ran along it. The subdivisions share common characteristics such as limited access from surrounding thoroughfares, curving interior drives, up to 3-acre (12,000 m^{2}) lot sizes, and large, traditionally-designed houses. Brentmoor Park and Forest Ridge lie to the west of Big Bend Blvd. and flanking Wydown Blvd.; the entrances both have matching tile-roofed red granite pavilions that served as waiting areas for the streetcar that formerly ran along Wydown Blvd. Brentmoor lies to the north of Wydown Blvd. just west of Brentmoor Park; the two subdivisions were originally linked, but the connection was closed off soon after construction.

Brentmoor Park was designed around a draw, or small valley, which has its lowest point near the intersection of Big Bend and Wydown. This natural land formation forms the common ground of a rectangular 33.8-acre (137,000 m^{2}) tract. The 23-acre (93,000 m^{2}) tract encompassing Forest Ridge has only 6 homes and rises to a central plateau with the lots planned around a large circular private park. Brentmoor's layout has a simple oval plan due to the evenness of its 49.8 acres (202,000 m^{2}).

The three subdivisions in this district contain 47 houses, 21 of which were built in the first decade after the sites were opened, with an additional 16 homes built before 1930. The homes contain a variety of architectural styles, including Medieval and Tudor Revival, Georgian Revival, Regency Revival, Colonial Revival, Spanish Colonial, and Mediterranean. Multiple residences were designed by Wright himself, along with architects including Howard Van Doren Shaw, Jamieson and Spearl, and Maritz & Young.

== Gallery ==
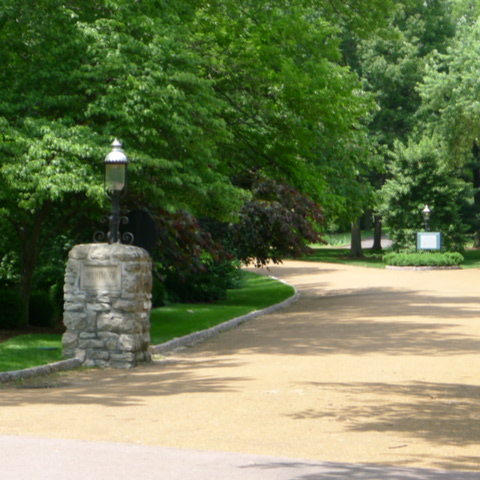
Entrance to the Brentmoor Park subdivision

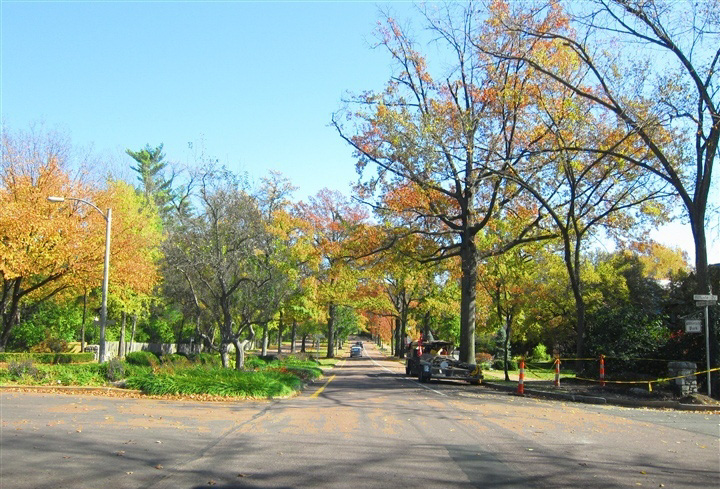
View of Wydown Boulevard in the Brentmoor Park, Brentmoor and Forest Ridge District
