= Greenwood Historic District =

Historic district in Missouri, United States

Coordinates: 38.6053°N 90.3207°W

- U.S. National Register of Historic Places
- U.S. Historic district
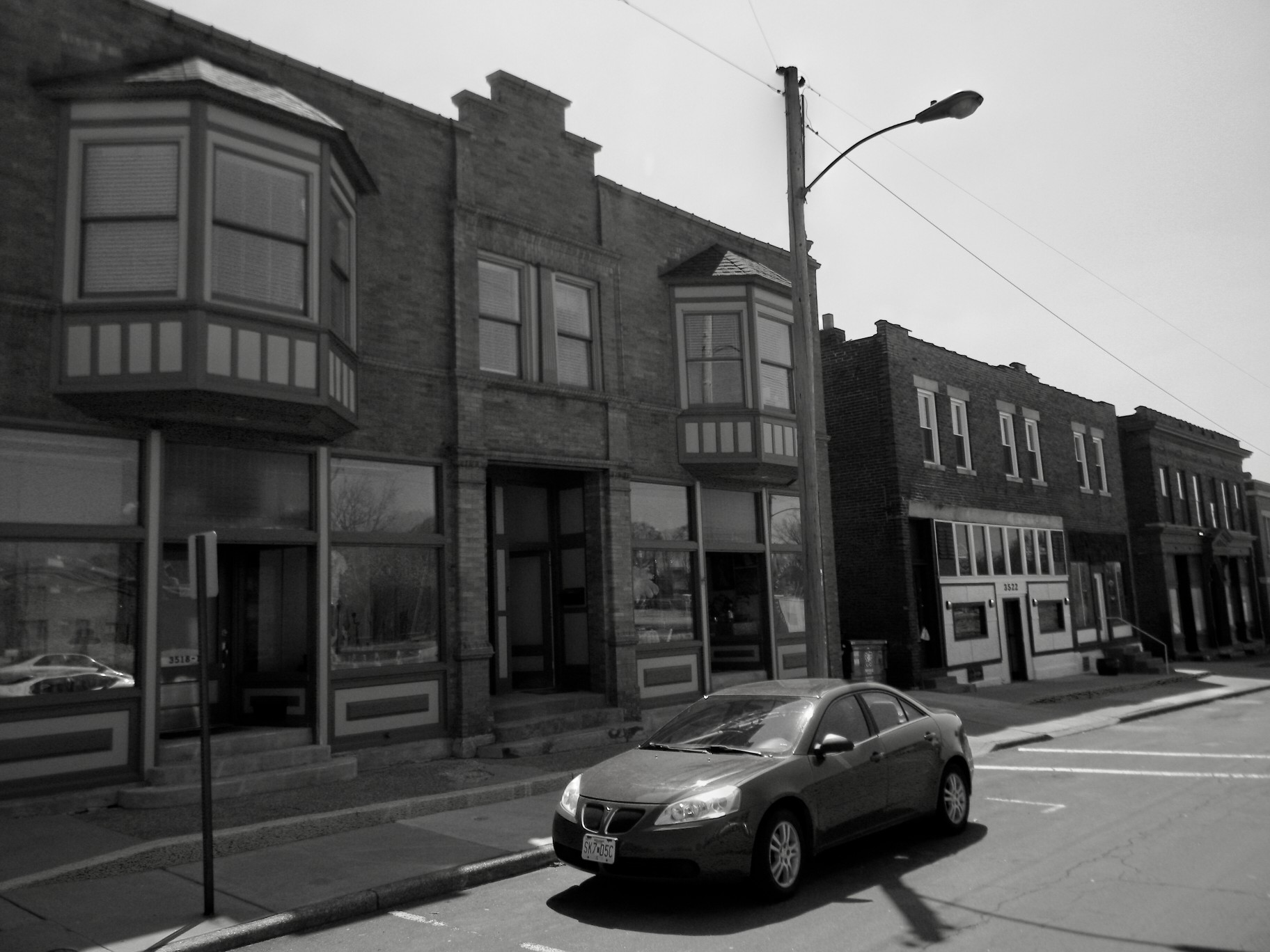

- Location within St. Louis Location within Missouri Location within the United States
- Location: 3500-3540 Greenwood and 7518 St. Elmo, Maplewood, Missouri
- Area: 3 acres (1.2 ha)
- Architectural style: Second Empire, Colonial Revival
- NRHP reference No.: 06000246
- Added to NRHP: April 12, 2006

Greenwood Historic District is part of Maplewood, Missouri, United States, situated at a whistle stop of the Missouri Pacific railroad line.

One building within it is what was once Milligan's Million Article Hardware Store, a thriving turn-of-the-century establishment (built 1905) at 3518 Greenwood Boulevard. The building itself (now "Studio Altius") has been restored by architect Patrick Jugo.
