= Pasadena Hills, Missouri =

- City
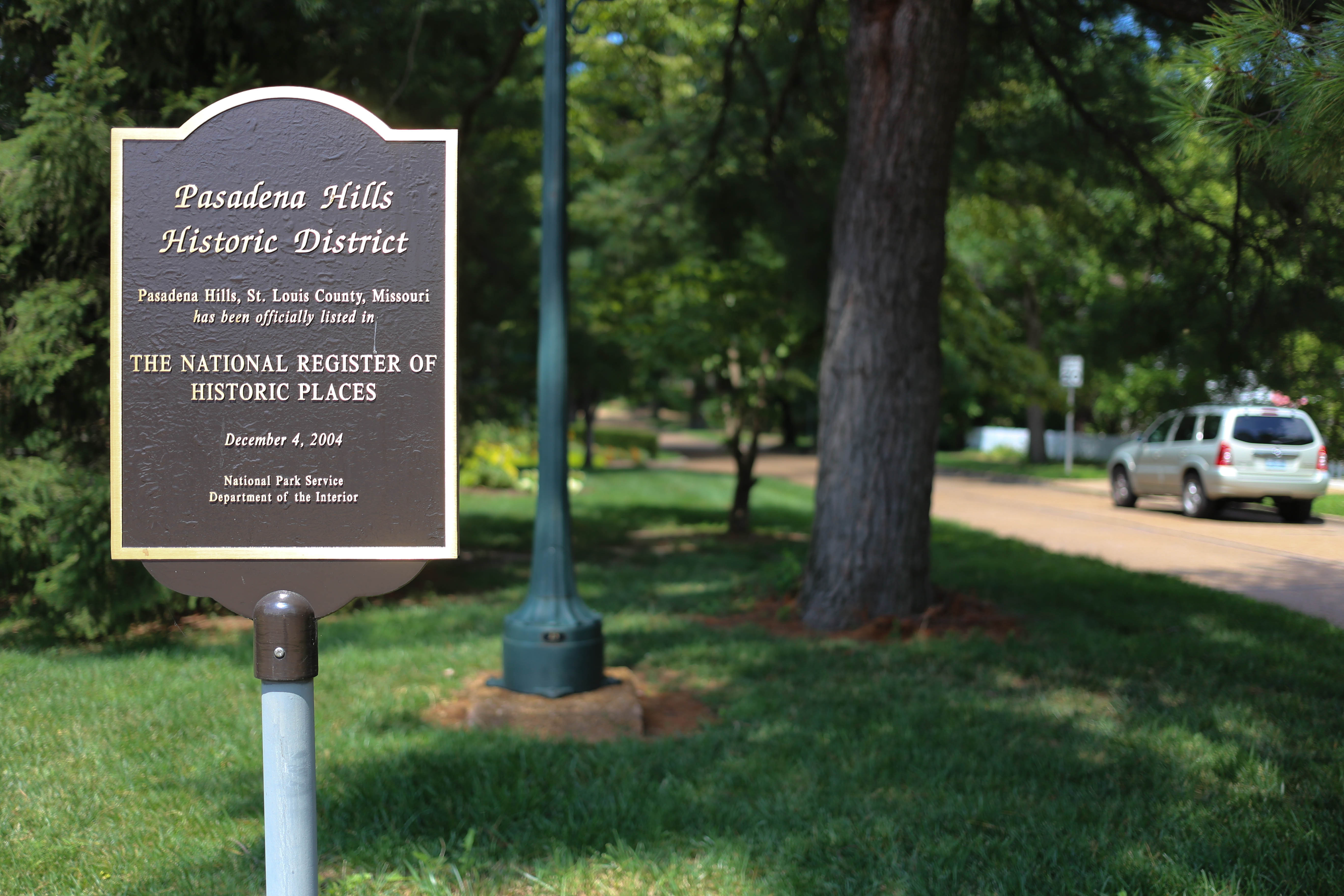
- Pasadena Hills, Missouri

- Location of Pasadena Hills, Missouri
- Coordinates: 38°42′30″N 90°17′32″W
- Country: United States
- State: Missouri
- County: St. Louis

Government
  - Mayor: Kevin Quinlisk

Area
  - Total: 0.21 sq mi (0.55 km^{2})
  - Land: 0.21 sq mi (0.55 km^{2})
  - Water: 0 sq mi (0.00 km^{2})
- Elevation: 653 ft (199 m)

Population (2020)
  - Total: 912
  - Density: 4,310.0/sq mi (1,664.09/km^{2})
- Time zone: UTC-6 (Central (CST))
  - Summer (DST): UTC-5 (CDT)
- ZIP code: 63121
- Area code: 314
- FIPS code: 29-56396
- GNIS feature ID: 2396159
- Website: www.pasadenahillsmo.us

Pasadena Hills is a city in St. Louis County, Missouri, United States. As of the 2020 census, Pasadena Hills had a population of 912. The entire city is listed on the National Register of Historic Places.

== Geography ==
According to the United States Census Bureau, the city has a total area of 0.22 square miles (0.57 km^{2}), all land.

== Demographics ==
Historical population
Census	Pop.	Note	%±
1940	839		—
1950	1,102		31.3%
1960	1,315		19.3%
1970	1,337		1.7%
1980	1,221		−8.7%
1990	1,165		−4.6%
2000	1,147		−1.5%
2010	930		−18.9%
2020	912		−1.9%
U.S. Decennial Census

=== 2020 census ===
Pasadena Hills city, Missouri – Racial and ethnic composition Note: the US Census treats Hispanic/Latino as an ethnic category. This table excludes Latinos from the racial categories and assigns them to a separate category. Hispanics/Latinos may be of any race.
Race / Ethnicity (NH = Non-Hispanic)	Pop 2000	Pop 2010	Pop 2020	% 2000	% 2010	% 2020
White alone (NH)	340	261	247	29.64%	28.06%	27.08%
Black or African American alone (NH)	772	628	597	67.31%	67.53%	65.46%
Native American or Alaska Native alone (NH)	2	9	3	0.17%	0.32%	0.33%
Asian alone (NH)	6	9	10	0.52%	0.97%	1.10%
Native Hawaiian or Pacific Islander alone (NH)	0	0	0	0.00%	0.00%	0.00%
Other race alone (NH)	1	1	0	0.09%	0.11%	0.00%
Mixed race or Multiracial (NH)	16	17	41	1.39%	1.83%	4.50%
Hispanic or Latino (any race)	10	11	14	0.87%	1.18%	1.54%
Total	1,147	930	912	100.00%	100.00%	100.00%

=== 2010 census ===
As of the census of 2010, there were 930 people, 433 households, and 273 families living in the city. The population density was 4,227.3 inhabitants per square mile (1,632.2/km^{2}). There were 470 housing units at an average density of 2,136.4 per square mile (824.9/km^{2}). The racial makeup of the city was 28.1% White, 68.3% African American, 0.4% Native American, 1.0% Asian, 0.4% from other races, and 1.8% from two or more races. Hispanic or Latino of any race were 1.2% of the population.

There were 433 households, of which 21.7% had children under the age of 18 living with them, 45.3% were married couples living together, 12.5% had a female householder with no husband present, 5.3% had a male householder with no wife present, and 37.0% were non-families. 31.9% of all households were made up of individuals, and 10.9% had someone living alone who was 65 years of age or older. The average household size was 2.15 and the average family size was 2.67.

The median age in the city was 50.4 years. 16.3% of residents were under the age of 18; 4.6% were between the ages of 18 and 24; 19.9% were from 25 to 44; 40.3% were from 45 to 64; and 18.8% were 65 years of age or older. The gender makeup of the city was 46.3% male and 53.7% female.

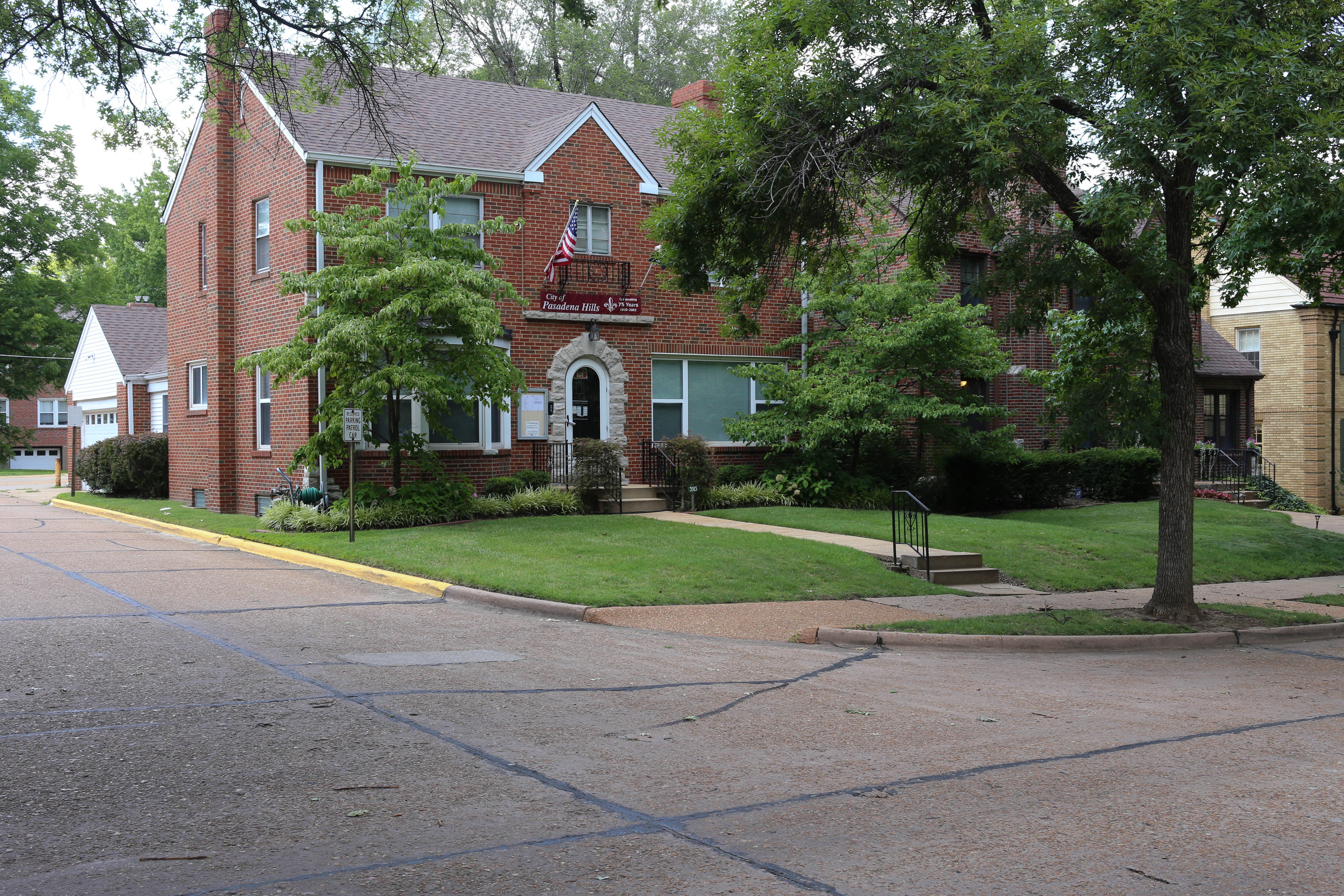
Pasadena Hills City Hall, July 2016

=== 2000 census ===
As of the census of 2000, there were 1,147 people, 460 households, and 316 families living in the city. The population density was 5,044.0 inhabitants per square mile (1,947.5/km^{2}). There were 478 housing units at an average density of 2,102.0 per square mile (811.6/km^{2}). The racial makeup of the city was 29.99% White, 67.39% African American, 0.17% Native American, 0.52% Asian, 0.09% from other races, and 1.83% from two or more races. Hispanic or Latino of any race were 0.87% of the population.

There were 460 households, out of which 29.8% had children under the age of 18 living with them, 51.1% were married couples living together, 14.8% had a female householder with no husband present, and 31.1% were non-families. 25.7% of all households were made up of individuals, and 6.7% had someone living alone who was 65 years of age or older. The average household size was 2.48 and the average family size was 3.02.

In the city, the population was spread out, with 22.5% under the age of 18, 6.8% from 18 to 24, 27.6% from 25 to 44, 32.4% from 45 to 64, and 10.7% who were 65 years of age or older. The median age was 41 years. For every 100 females, there were 79.8 males. For every 100 females age 18 and over, there were 75.7 males.

The median income for a household in the city was $83,438, and the median income for a family was $91,354. Males had a median income of $77,500 versus $52,596 for females. The per capita income for the city was $48,065. There were .7% of families and 1.0% of the population living below the poverty line, including 1.4% of under 18 and 4.1% of those over 64.

== Education ==
It is in the Normandy Schools Collaborative school district. The comprehensive high school of the district is Normandy High School.

Jefferson Elementary School is in Pasadena Hills.
