= Manchester United Methodist Church =

Historic church in Missouri, United States

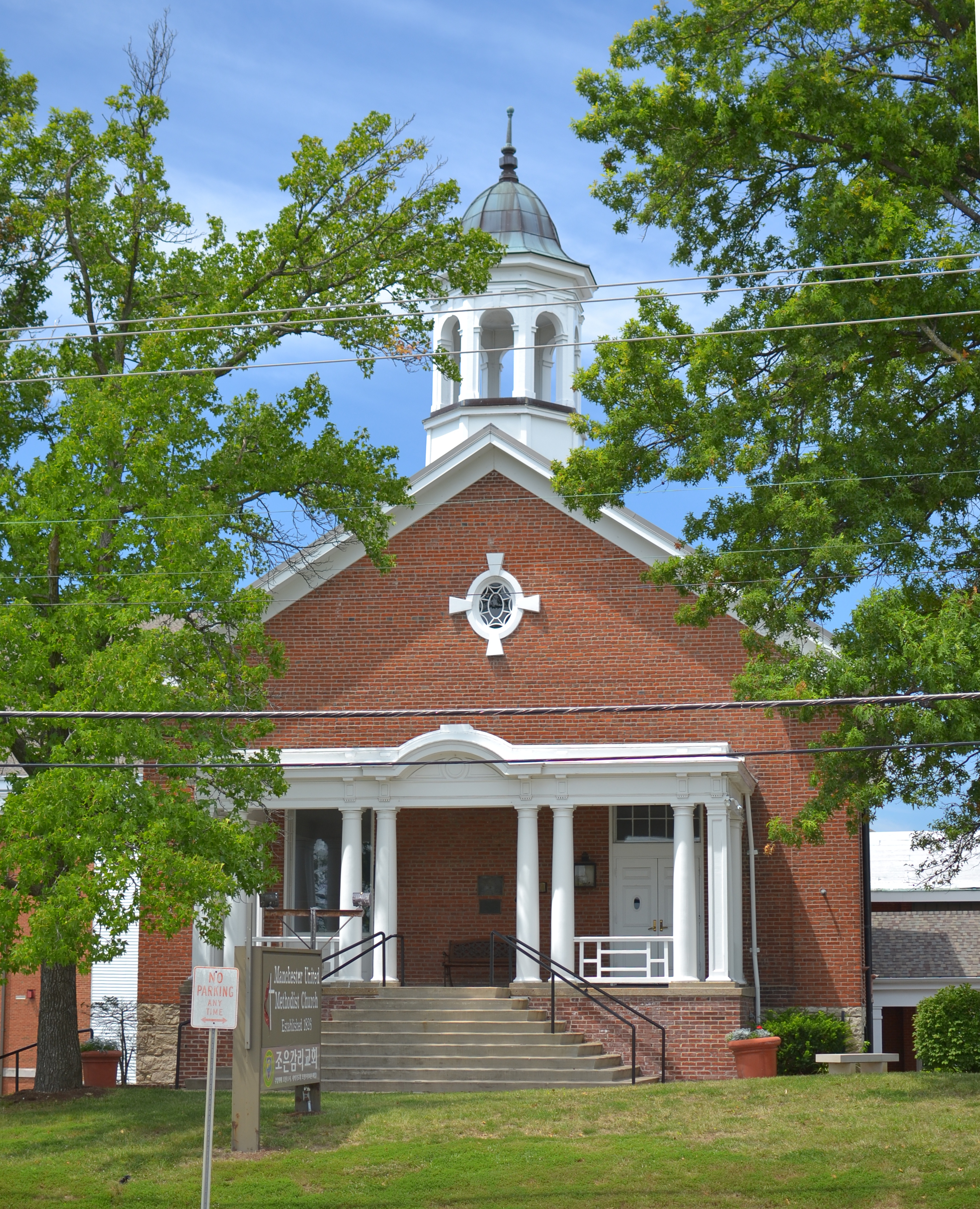
- The 1859 chapel
- Manchester United Methodist Church
- Location: 129 Woods Mill Road, Manchester, Missouri
- Country: United States
- Denomination: United Methodist
- Previous denomination: Methodist Episcopal
- Churchmanship: Evangelical
- Website: http://www.manchesterumc.org

History
- Former name: Manchester Methodist Episcopal Church
- Status: Church
- Founded: 1856

Architecture
- Architectural type: Chapel
- Style: Originally Greek Revival
- Completed: 1859
- Construction cost: $6,389.00 (1859)

Clergy
- Pastor(s): Rev. Ron Beaton, Lead Pastor; Rev. Dr. Andy Blacksher, Executive Pastor; Rev. Dr. Mary Beth Hartenstein, Pastor of Compassion and Justice
- Manchester Methodist Episcopal Church
- U.S. National Register of Historic Places
- Location within Missouri Location within the United States
- Coordinates: 38°35′41″N 90°30′34″W
- Area: 9.9 acres (4.0 ha)
- Built: 1856
- Architectural style: Greek Revival
- NRHP reference No.: 83001053
- Added to NRHP: February 10, 1983

Manchester United Methodist Church (formerly Manchester Methodist Episcopal Church, abbreviated Manchester UMC) is a United Methodist church in Manchester, Missouri. It was the first church to be established in the western part of St. Louis County and was listed on the National Register of Historic Places in 1982. The church is among the largest United Methodist congregations in Missouri, with over 2,700 members. In 2019, Manchester UMC reported a weekly attendance of 1,069

== History ==
Before the church building was built, the area had been a preaching place of the St. Louis Circuit. However, it is unknown when the first Methodist services were held. In 1844, the Methodist Church split and the St. Louis Circuit joined the Methodist Episcopal Church, South. Construction for the chapel started in 1856, and in 1859, Sunday School classes were held in its basement until it officially opened later that year, with a total building cost of $6,389.00. An educational building and offices were added in 1965, both located west of the chapel. The educational building, designed by St. Louis architect Lester Black, is two stories and contains twelve rooms. The church office building is also two stories. In 1968, construction for a new sanctuary began. The Contemporary Colonial style building was designed by P. J. Hoener and Associates. Just north of the church buildings is a cemetery belonging to the church. The original Greek Revival chapel was a brick building over a limestone foundation. It originally had two separate entrances, one for men and the other for women. In 1984, the newer sanctuary was enlarged and the educational building was renovated. The sanctuary was again updated in 1993. In 1997, construction for a new, larger sanctuary began designed by Gale A. Hill & Associates (Kouba+Knoop Associates), and it opened in 1998. The church's first official pastor was Wesley Browning. During the American Civil War, the church held regular services with regular ministers, which was uncommon in Missouri during the war.

In 1983, abnormally high levels of dioxin were discovered in the soil around the church's southern side. The church began holding an annual Fair Trade Market in 2003, the largest fair trade shopping event in the United States. The project was founded by Kellee Sikes, Plowsharing Crafts and the Justice Advocates of Manchester United Methodist Church. In 2015 the pipe organ in the sanctuary was rebuilt and enlarged by R.A. Colby of Johnson City, TN. The organ contains the only moveable five manual console in the state of Missouri and it is the largest hybrid (pipe/digital) organ in this part of the country.

The current lead pastor, Reverend Ron Beaton, was appointed by Bishop Robert Farr, to serve the congregation in July 2024.
