= Assumption Greek Orthodox Church =

Historic church in Missouri, United States

- U.S. National Register of Historic Places
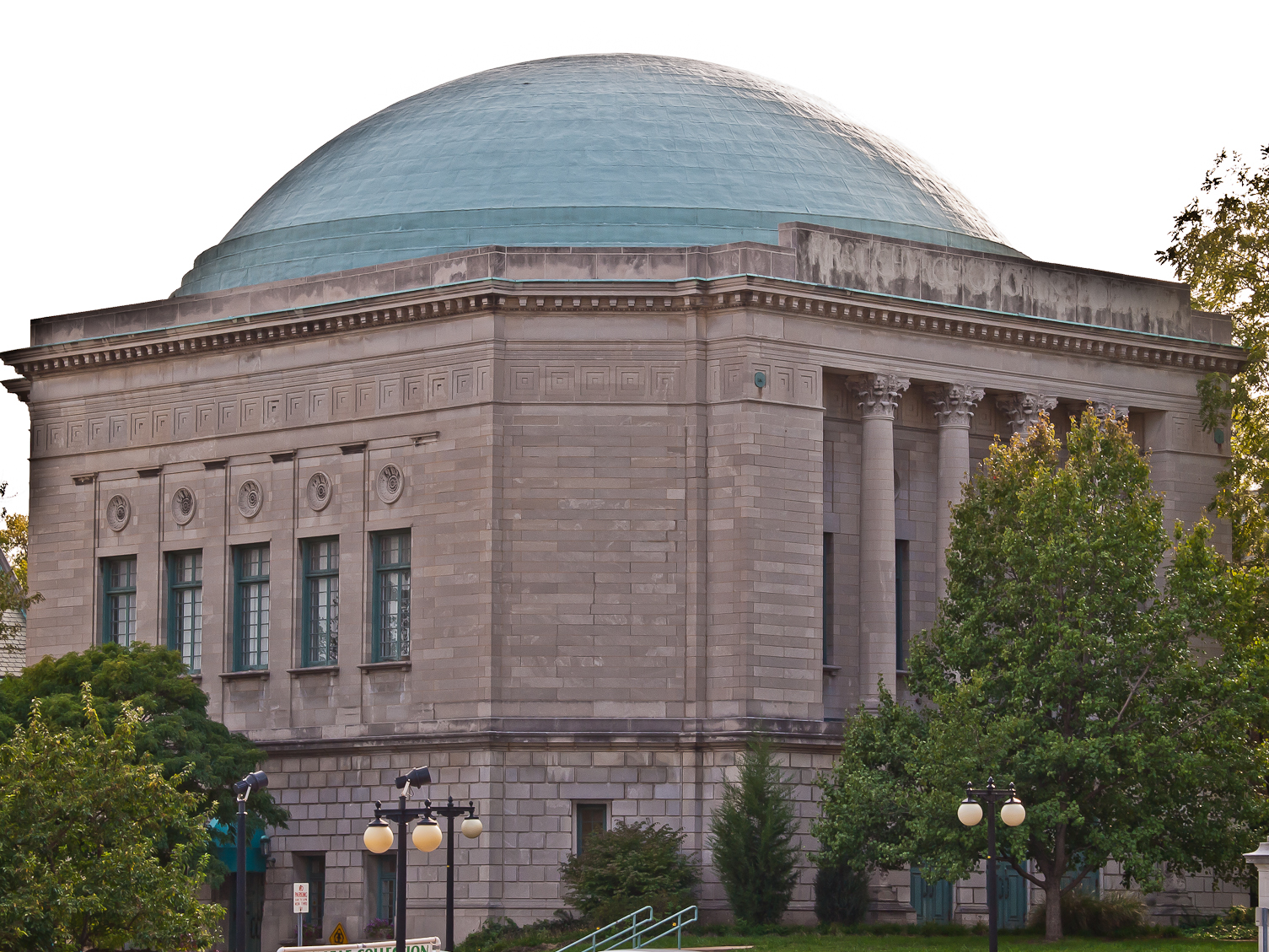

- Location within St. Louis Location within Missouri Location within the United States
- Location: 6900 Delmar Blvd., University City, Missouri
- Coordinates: 38°39′22″N 90°18′41″W
- Area: 0.8 acres (0.32 ha)
- Built: 1924
- Architect: Barnett, T.P., & Co.
- Engineer: Frederick C. Taxis
- NRHP reference No.: 80004389
- Added to NRHP: September 23, 1980

Assumption Greek Orthodox Church is a historic church building at 6900 Delmar Boulevard in University City, Missouri. The building was added to the National Register of Historic Places in 1980.

== History ==
The church edifice was built in 1924 by First Church of Christ, Scientist, University City. The congregation had been meeting since 1921 in a store on Delmar Boulevard. After completion, the building's domed roof was especially noted for its architectural excellence.

In 1958, the congregation purchased a five-acre lot in nearby Creve Coeur with the intention of moving there; and in 1962, changed its name to First Church of Christ, Scientist, Creve Coeur. The church is still active at this location.

The church community of Assumption Greek Orthodox Church was chartered in 1940, a small existing church was purchased at 1605 Euclid Avenue in the city of St. Louis. the location was perfect for the majority of parishioners who lived within walking distance. In 1948, as the parish grew, a larger facility was purchased at 1212 Academy, also in St. Louis. the property contained a gym and schoolrooms that could accommodate a growing parish.

In 1958, the parishioners began moving to different areas of the city and county, and thus the decision to relocate to a more convenient area was made. The property at 6900 Delmar Boulevard was purchased in University City. The congregation felt that the property had architecturally unique properties, and renovated it to suit the church's needs. In 1978, a Town and Country property was purchased at 1755 Des Peres Road. Here an original building was built from the ground up. In 1989, the Basilica and community center was finalized. Today the church resides at 1755 Des Peres Rd., Town And Country, MO 63131.
