= Beverly Theater (University City, Missouri) =

- U.S. National Register of Historic Places
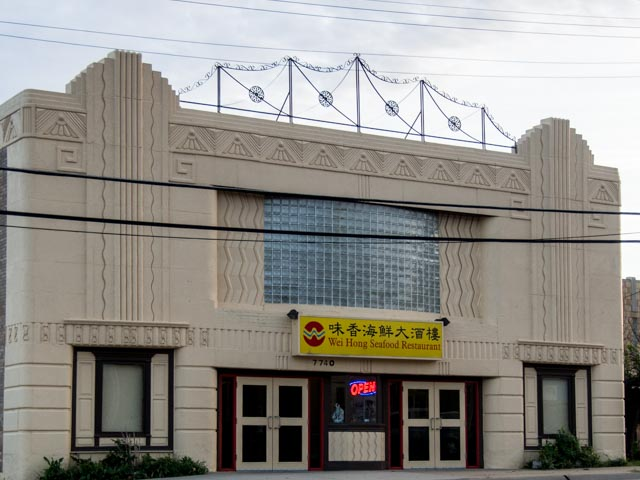
- The Beverly Theater
- Location: 7740 Olive Boulevard, University City, Missouri
- Coordinates: 38.671944°N 90.337222°W
- NRHP reference No.: 05000811

The Beverly Theater is a former art-house theater in the Olive corridor commerce area of University City, MO.

== History ==
In the 1960s, Mid America Theaters owned the building, and showed art-house films. In 1964, it was renamed the Fine Arts.

The theater is currently occupied by a Chinese restaurant.
