= Bellefontaine Neighbors, Missouri =

- City
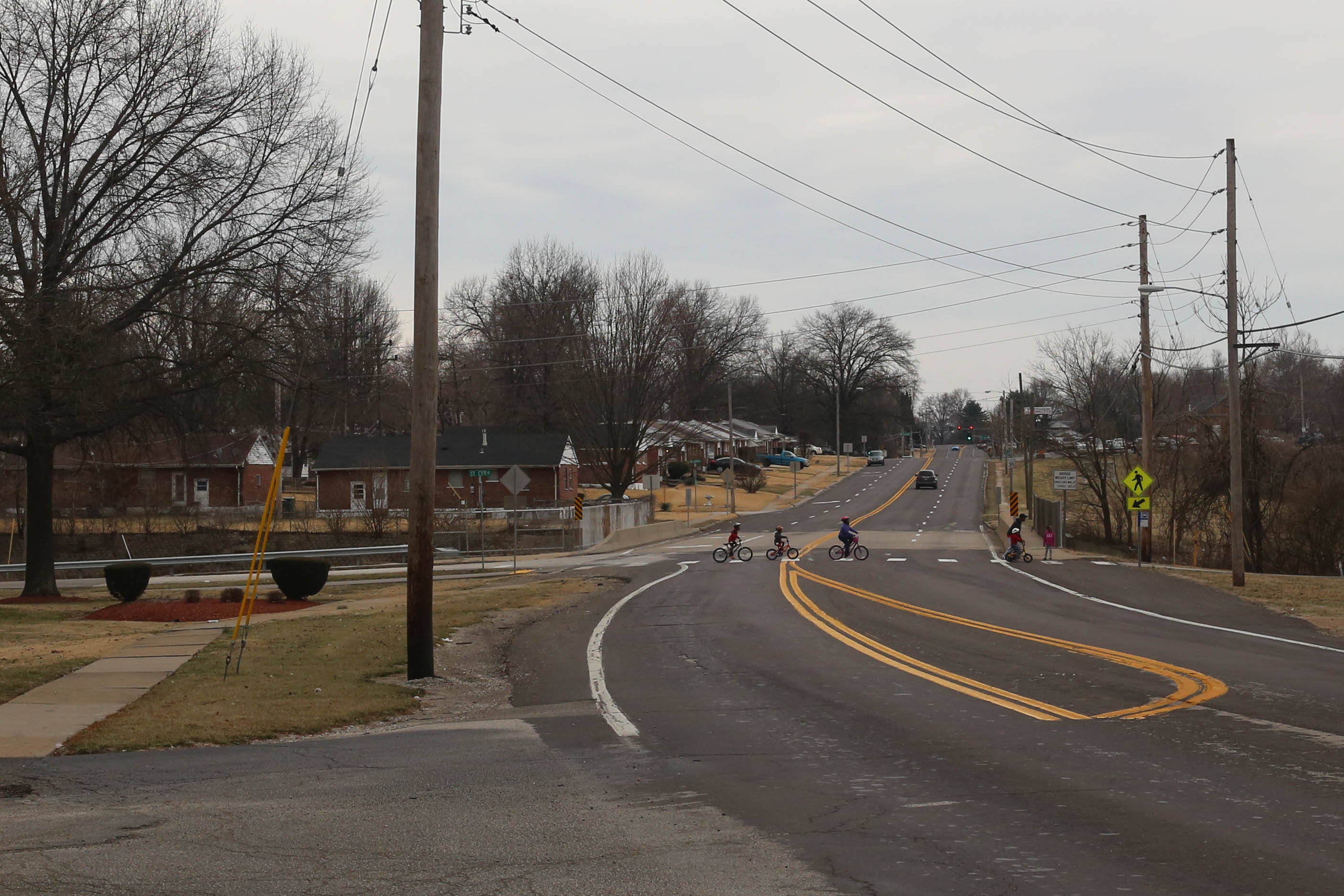
- Bellefontaine Road in Bellefontaine Neighbors, Missouri, February 2017

- Icon

- Location of Bellefontaine Neighbors, Missouri
- Coordinates: 38°45′10″N 90°13′41″W
- Country: United States
- State: Missouri
- County: St. Louis
- Townships: St. Ferdinand, Ferguson, Spanish Lake
- Incorporated: June 19, 1950

Area
  - Total: 4.40 sq mi (11.40 km^{2})
  - Land: 4.40 sq mi (11.40 km^{2})
  - Water: 0 sq mi (0.00 km^{2})
- Elevation: 492 ft (150 m)

Population (2020)
  - Total: 10,740
  - Density: 2,440.7/sq mi (942.37/km^{2})
- Time zone: UTC-6 (Central (CST))
  - Summer (DST): UTC-5 (CDT)
- FIPS code: 29-04222
- GNIS feature ID: 2394117
- Website: www.cityofbn.com

Bellefontaine Neighbors (/bɛlˈfaʊntən/ bel-FOWN-tən) is an inner-ring suburban city in St. Louis County, Missouri, United States. The population was 10,740 at the 2020 census.

== History ==
The history of Bellefontaine Neighbors, Missouri, can be traced back to the mid-1800s when the area was part of the Louisiana Territory, which was ceded by France to Spain in 1762 in the Treaty of Fontainebleau. Spanish military authorities constructed forts near the mouth of the Missouri River to strengthen their hold on the territory and discourage intruders from the east. A Captain Rios, who was dispatched to the area, established forts near the present-day locations of Spanish Pond (or Spanish Lake) and Fort San Carlos in St. Louis.

In 1800, Spain ceded the territory west of the Mississippi River back to France, which then sold it to the United States in 1803 as part of the Louisiana Purchase. In 1804, a treaty was made with the Sac and Fox Indians that led to the establishment of a trading post on the south bank of the Missouri River. The area was chosen for its natural advantages, including a large clear water spring called "la belle fontaine" by the early French settlers.

By the winter of 1805, Fort Bellefontaine was constructed under the command of Colonel Jacob Kingsbury, with log cabins, a trading house, a bakery, a blacksmith shop, and huts for enlisted soldiers. General Daniel Bissell served as the military commander of the territory and resided at Fort Bellefontaine for several years. The fort was connected to St. Louis by a trail that eventually evolved into present-day Bellefontaine Road.

Fort Bellefontaine was abandoned in 1834, and the surrounding land was divided into land grants. The area that is now Bellefontaine Neighbors was made up of land grants issued by Spanish, French, and American officials. Notable landowners in the area included General Daniel Bissell, who purchased land through public land sales, and Dr. James W. Gibson, who built his home "Forest Home" in the area in 1832.

The area remained primarily agricultural until the 1950s, when a building boom following World War II led to the construction of subdivisions and a population increase. Bellefontaine Neighbors was incorporated as a fourth-class city in 1950, with a population of 766 people. At the time, the city had 18 streets, one public school, and one church, the Bellefontaine Methodist Church.

Between 1950 and 1960, the population of Bellefontaine Neighbors grew rapidly, reaching 13,650 people by 1960. The growth resulted in the construction of new churches, such as St. Jerome's Catholic Church, Our Lady of Good Counsel Catholic Church, Bellefontaine Neighbors Baptist Church, Grace Lutheran Chapel, and Frieden's Evangelical and Reformed Church. Additionally, the number of schools in the city increased, with Gibson Elementary, Danforth Elementary, Grace Lutheran, Stormin Academy, and Riverview Gardens Senior High School now serving the community.

The city administration of Bellefontaine Neighbors has evolved since its incorporation, with A. W. Schnur appointed as the first mayor in 1950. The city is divided into four wards and operates under a Mayor-Aldermen form of government, with the mayor and aldermen elected to four-year terms. Elections are held on the first Tuesday in April.

== Geography ==
Bellefontaine Neighbors is a second-ring northern suburb of St. Louis.

According to the United States Census Bureau, the city has a total area of 4.32 square miles (11.19 km^{2}), all land.

=== Surrounding areas ===
Spanish Lake
Unincorporated Ferguson township Spanish Lake
Castle Point / Moline Acres / Jennings Glasgow Village / Riverview
Jennings St. Louis
St. Louis

== Demographics ==
Historical population
Census	Pop.	Note	%±
1960	13,650		—
1970	14,084		3.2%
1980	12,082		−14.2%
1990	10,922		−9.6%
2000	11,271		3.2%
2010	10,860		−3.6%
2020	10,740		−1.1%
U.S. Decennial Census

=== Racial and ethnic composition ===
Bellefontaine Neighbors city, Missouri – Racial and ethnic composition Note: the US Census treats Hispanic/Latino as an ethnic category. This table excludes Latinos from the racial categories and assigns them to a separate category. Hispanics/Latinos may be of any race.
Race / Ethnicity (NH = Non-Hispanic)	Pop 2000	Pop 2010	Pop 2020	% 2000	% 2010	% 2020
White alone (NH)	6,034	2,770	1,396	53.54%	25.51%	13.00%
Black or African American alone (NH)	4,986	7,874	8,886	44.24%	72.50%	82.74%
Native American or Alaska Native alone (NH)	21	12	27	0.19%	0.11%	0.25%
Asian alone (NH)	29	18	18	0.26%	0.17%	0.17%
Native Hawaiian or Pacific Islander alone (NH)	2	1	1	0.02%	0.01%	0.01%
Other race alone (NH)	9	17	48	0.08%	0.16%	0.45%
Mixed race or Multiracial (NH)	114	114	230	1.01%	1.05%	2.14%
Hispanic or Latino (any race)	76	54	134	0.67%	0.50%	1.25%
Total	11,271	10,860	10,740	100.00%	100.00%	100.00%

=== 2020 census ===
As of the 2020 census, Bellefontaine Neighbors had a population of 10,740. The population density was 2,440.9 per square mile (942.1/km^{2}). The median age was 41.7 years. 23.6% of residents were under the age of 18 and 16.5% were 65 years of age or older. For every 100 females, there were 81.6 males, and for every 100 females age 18 and over, there were 76.1 males.

100.0% of residents lived in urban areas, while 0.0% lived in rural areas.

There were 4,249 households in Bellefontaine Neighbors and 2,703 families. Of the households, 31.4% had children under the age of 18 living in them. Of all households, 25.4% were married-couple households, 18.9% were households with a male householder and no spouse or partner present, and 49.1% were households with a female householder and no spouse or partner present. About 31.3% of all households were made up of individuals and 11.5% had someone living alone who was 65 years of age or older.

There were 4,614 housing units, of which 7.9% were vacant. The homeowner vacancy rate was 1.3% and the rental vacancy rate was 9.4%.

=== Income and poverty ===
The 2016–2020 5-year American Community Survey estimates show that the median household income was $41,815 (with a margin of error of +/- $5,373) and the median family income $50,149 (+/- $12,744). Males had a median income of $29,507 (+/- $4,998) versus $22,544 (+/- $10,257) for females. The median income for those above 16 years old was $27,320 (+/- $4,448). Approximately, 23.2% of families and 23.1% of the population were below the poverty line, including 40.8% of those under the age of 18 and 29.4% of those ages 65 or over.

=== 2010 census ===
As of the census of 2010, there were 10,860 people, 4,311 households, and 2,784 families living in the city. The population density was 2,513.9 inhabitants per square mile (970.6/km^{2}). There were 4,645 housing units at an average density of 1,075.2 per square mile (415.1/km^{2}). The racial makeup of the city was 25.7% White, 72.7% African American, 0.1% Native American, 0.2% Asian, 0.2% from other races, and 1.1% from two or more races. Hispanic or Latino of any race were 0.5% of the population.

There were 4,311 households, of which 33.7% had children under the age of 18 living with them, 32.0% were married couples living together, 27.1% had a female householder with no husband present, 5.5% had a male householder with no wife present, and 35.4% were non-families. 31.3% of all households were made up of individuals, and 10.1% had someone living alone who was 65 years of age or older. The average household size was 2.41 and the average family size was 2.98.

The median age in the city was 40.5 years. 23% of residents were under the age of 18; 7.8% were between the ages of 18 and 24; 25.8% were from 25 to 44; 29.5% were from 45 to 64; and 13.8% were 65 years of age or older. The gender makeup of the city was 46.1% male and 53.9% female.

=== 2000 census ===
As of the census of 2000, there were 11,271 people, 4,388 households, and 2,966 families living in the city. The population density was 2,573.2 inhabitants per square mile (993.5/km^{2}). There were 4,550 housing units at an average density of 1,038.8 per square mile (401.1/km^{2}). The racial makeup of the city was 53.73% White, 44.41% African American, 0.20% Native American, 0.26% Asian, 0.02% Pacific Islander, 0.31% from other races, and 1.07% from two or more races. Hispanic or Latino of any race were 0.67% of the population.

There were 4,388 households, out of which 32.8% had children under the age of 18 living with them, 42.8% were married couples living together, 20.7% had a female householder with no husband present, and 32.4% were non-families. 29.4% of all households were made up of individuals, and 14.5% had someone living alone who was 65 years of age or older. The average household size was 2.39 and the average family size was 2.93.

In the city, the population was spread out, with 24.1% under the age of 18, 8.2% from 18 to 24, 29.8% from 25 to 44, 20.2% from 45 to 64, and 17.7% who were 65 years of age or older. The median age was 38 years. For every 100 females, there were 88.1 males. For every 100 females age 18 and over, there were 83.2 males.

The median income for a household in the city was $40,007, and the median income for a family was $44,314. Males had a median income of $34,909 versus $26,202 for females. The per capita income for the city was $18,911. About 5.4% of families and 6.5% of the population were below the poverty line, including 7.3% of those under age 18 and 4.7% of those age 65 or over.

== Places of interest ==
- General Daniel Bissell House, listed on the National Register of Historic Places since November 28, 1978.
- Wilson Larimore House, historic house, and former plantation; listed on the National Register of Historic Places since February 10, 1989.

== Notable people ==
- Tommie Pierson Jr., state representative
- Gina Walsh, state senator

== See also ==
- National Register of Historic Places listings in St. Louis County, Missouri
