= Coldwater Creek (Missouri river tributary) =

Stream in St. Louis County, Missouri

Coordinates: 38°49′54″N 90°13′08″W

Coldwater Creek (also Cold Water Creek) is a 19-mile tributary of the Missouri River in north St. Louis County in the U.S. state of Missouri. It is known to be contaminated with radioactive wastes several miles upstream of its northern mouth.

== Location ==
The creek begins in a small spring-fed lake in Overland, then flows north through the cities of Breckenridge Hills, St. Ann, and Bridgeton before entering a culvert underneath Lambert International Airport. North of the airport, it flows northeast through the communities of Hazelwood, Berkeley, Florissant, Old Jamestown, Black Jack, and Spanish Lake. According to St. Louis Magazine, "It runs past schools, golf courses, and soccer fields."

The creek terminates at the Missouri River between the Lewis Bridge and the Columbia Bottom Conservation Area.

== History ==
The name "Cold Water Creek" is a translation of the original French name Rivière de L'eau Froide. The Spaniards called it Río Fernando, Spanish for "Ferdinand River". The French also called it Rivière aux Biches, French for "River of Roebucks".

=== Mallinckrodt nuclear waste contamination ===
==== Origins and early contamination (1940s–1970s) ====
In 1942, Mallinckrodt Chemical Works reached an exclusive agreement with the U.S. government's Manhattan Engineering District, an agency of the U.S. Department of Energy, to produce weapons-grade uranium at its factory north of downtown St. Louis.

From 1947, the company and the United States Army Corps of Engineers (USACE) used a 21.7-acre property near Lambert Field for the purpose of burying steel drums containing the radioactive wastes from the downtown plant and other locations. That site became the St. Louis Airport Storage Site (SLAPS).

In 1966, the Cotter Corporation purchased minerals from the Mallinckrodt Chemical Works for refinement. Barium sulfate along with other chemical and radiological extraction products were stored at Latty Avenue. Additionally, Cotter Corp. worked with B&K Construction to dry and transport material to Canon City, Colorado.

In 1973, when the process of extraction was determined to be unprofitable, the radioactive waste was shipped in uncovered dump trucks to a landfill site on Latty Avenue, and another, the West Lake Landfill in Bridgeton. Material from both the original SLAPS site and from the Latty site eventually made its way into the creek bed and to many neighboring homes and properties.

==== Superfund designation and health concerns (1980s–2000s) ====
In December 1989, the U.S. Department of Energy reported that radioactive material was found to be present "in and along" the creek. That release of information halted a flood-control project planned between the United States Army Corps of Engineers (USACE) and local suburban communities for the previous eleven years. The material was traced to two nearby dump sites, both from a common source: the Mallinckrodt Chemical Works. That same year, the creek was finalized on the National Priorities List of the Superfund program of the U.S. Environmental Protection Agency.

In 2004, Mallinckrodt employees, who worked with uranium used in nuclear weapon manufacturing, became eligible for compensation in Weldon Spring and St. Louis under the Employees Occupational Illness Compensation Program Act (EEOICPA). Workers were required to prove how much exposure they had to radiation while working at the Mallinckrodt facility. In 2025, President Donald Trump signed into law legislation introduced by Senator Josh Hawley to expand the Radiation Exposure Compensation Act (RECA) to include 21 zip codes in the St. Louis area.

In 2006, the U.S. Environmental Protection Agency (EPA) proposed cleanup plans for two parts of the site: Operable Unit 1 (OU1), which includes areas contaminated with radioactive material, and Operable Unit 2 (OU2), which includes the non-radioactive landfill areas. In 2008, the EPA issued official Records of Decision for both units. The plan for OU1 called for capping the landfill, consolidating radioactive soil, and monitoring groundwater. The plan for OU2 focused on installing caps and continuing long-term environmental monitoring.

==== Cleanup efforts and ongoing investigations (2010–2020) ====
In 2010, Republic Services reported to the department's Waste Management Program that a subsurface smoldering event (SSE) was discovered at the Bridgeton Landfill, raising concerns about potential threats to nearby radioactive waste. The fire produced strong odors and excessive gas, which residents and workers reported as making them ill.

Between 2008 and 2011, local residents noticed what seemed an unusual concentration of cancers, other illnesses, and birth defects among their age cohort. Many were graduates of McCluer North High School and organized around its class reunions.

In 2012, the Centers for Disease Control and Prevention (CDC) reported that the U.S. Army Corps of Engineers (USACE) began a detailed investigation of Coldwater Creek and its floodplain, working downstream from historic contamination sources. This investigation was part of the Formerly Utilized Sites Remedial Action Program (FUSRAP), a USACE program to clean up sites contaminated by Manhattan Project waste.

In 2013, three years after the subsurface smoldering event (SSE) began, then-Attorney General Chris Koster filed a lawsuit against Republic Services over ongoing environmental and safety concerns. The Missouri Department of Health and Senior Services also released a report that found that from 1996 to 2011, rates of radiation-related cancers such as thyroid cancer and leukemia were not higher near Coldwater Creek compared to the rest of Missouri.

In 2014, an extraction system was installed at the Bridgeton Landfill to control the sulfur-based odors. A report from the Missouri Department of Health and Senior Services indicated that the system reduced emissions and associated health risks.

In August 2015, the United States Army Corps of Engineers confirmed finding low levels of thorium-230 at St. Cin Park, located near Coldwater Creek and close to Jana Elementary. Flooding prompted further testing of soil and water along the creek.

In January 2016, the Centers for Disease Control and Prevention investigated the high rate of cancers in the area, and confirmed a potential link between the cluster and the polluted creek. Later that year, the United States Army Corps of Engineers sent a letter to the Hazelwood School District to obtain legal access to test soil at Jana Elementary for contamination linked to Coldwater Creek.

In 2018, the EPA revised its cleanup plan: partial excavation and off-site disposal of the most contaminated soil, up to 20 feet deep in certain areas, while leaving less-contaminated sections capped in place.

In 2019, the EPA signed an agreement with Bridgeton Landfill, LLC; Cotter Corporation; and the U.S. Department of Energy to design the cleanup for OU1. Over the next several years, field sampling and design investigations were carried out to refine the cleanup approach.

By 2020, the EPA had approved work plans for OU2 and OU3 (a new unit created to study groundwater contamination). These studies helped identify how radioactive materials and other pollutants might have spread through the soil and water.

==== Recent developments (2021–present) ====
In January 2022, radioactive material was found on the edge of Jana Elementary School's property boundary in the Hazelwood School District in Florissant. The radioactive material included lead-210, polonium, radium, and other toxic materials. However, follow-up testing by the Army Corps of Engineers and a local consultant found that, while radioactive material was present at Jana Elementary, levels did not pose an immediate risk and did not exceed background levels found naturally at other schools.

In August 2022, the Boston Chemical Data Corp. tested the property of Jana Elementary and found high levels of radioactive lead and polonium (also known as Pb 210) inside the school building and in the playground soil. In October 2022, Hazelwood School District announced that Jana Elementary School would move to virtual instruction and the Army Corps of Engineers announced that it would expand its sampling to include the entire property of Jana Elementary with soil samples and structure surveys both inside and outside the school. In November 2022, students from Jana Elementary were relocated to redistricted schools for in-person learning.

In 2023, Hazelwood School District announced that Jana Elementary School was not expected to reopen. The United States Army Corps of Engineers released a series of reports concluding that Jana Elementary was “safe from a radiological standpoint.”

In January 2025, the EPA issued an Explanation of Significant Differences (ESD) that updated the 2018 and 2008 cleanup plans for OU1 and OU2. The changes expanded the OU1 area, reduced the OU2 boundaries, and adjusted cleanup methods and cost estimates.

In July 2025, researchers from the Harvard T.H. Chan School of Public Health published a study linking childhood residence near Coldwater Creek to higher cancer risk later in life. The study analyzed data from over 4,000 participants in the St. Louis Baby Tooth – Later Life Health Study, finding that individuals who lived closer to the creek during the 1940s–1960s had significantly higher rates of cancer than those who lived farther away. Those residing within one kilometer of the creek faced a 44% greater overall cancer risk, with particularly elevated rates of thyroid, breast, leukemia, and basal cell cancers.

As of 2025, the site remains in the Remedial Design phase, with pre-excavation sampling underway to determine exact digging locations. Excavation and landfill cover construction are expected to begin once design work is complete. The EPA continues to coordinate work across all three operable units, focusing on excavation, landfill containment, and groundwater protection.
