= Old Jamestown, Missouri =

- Unincorporated community Census-designated place
- Location of Old Jamestown, Missouri
- Coordinates: 38°50′21″N 90°16′55″W
- Country: United States
- State: Missouri
- County: St. Louis
- Townships: Lewis and Clark, Spanish Lake
- Established: 2010

Area
  - Total: 14.95 sq mi (38.73 km^{2})
  - Land: 14.95 sq mi (38.71 km^{2})
  - Water: 0.0077 sq mi (0.02 km^{2})
- Elevation: 538 ft (164 m)

Population (2020)
  - Total: 19,790
  - Density: 1,324.1/sq mi (511.23/km^{2})
- Time zone: UTC-6 (Central (CST))
  - Summer (DST): UTC-5 (CDT)
- ZIP codes: 63033, 63034
- Area code(s): 314/557
- FIPS code: 29-54352
- GNIS feature ID: 2583784
- Website: oldjamestownassn.org

Old Jamestown is an unincorporated community and census-designated place (CDP) in St. Louis County, Missouri, United States. The population was 19,790 at the 2020 census. Old Jamestown is northwest of the city of St. Louis and borders the Missouri River.

== Geography ==
According to the United States Census Bureau, the CDP has a total area of 14.9 square miles (38.7 km^{2}), of which 0.008 square miles (0.02 km^{2}), or 0.06%, is water. The community is located mostly to the north and west of U.S. Route 67 in northern St. Louis County. West Alton is to the north, across the Missouri River. Florissant is to the southwest, and Black Jack and Spanish Lake are to the south. The CDP is located 17 miles (27 km) north of downtown St. Louis.

== Demographics ==
Historical population
Census	Pop.	Note	%±
2010	19,184		—
2020	19,790		3.2%
U.S. Decennial Census

Old Jamestown first appeared as a census designated place in the 2010 U.S. census.

=== Racial and ethnic composition ===
Old Jamestown CDP, Missouri – Racial and ethnic composition Note: the US Census treats Hispanic/Latino as an ethnic category. This table excludes Latinos from the racial categories and assigns them to a separate category. Hispanics/Latinos may be of any race.
Race / Ethnicity (NH = Non-Hispanic)	Pop 2010	Pop 2020	% 2010	% 2020
White alone (NH)	7,928	4,832	41.33%	24.42%
Black or African American alone (NH)	10,253	13,531	53.45%	68.37%
Native American or Alaska Native alone (NH)	23	26	0.12%	0.13%
Asian alone (NH)	336	307	1.75%	1.55%
Native Hawaiian or Pacific Islander alone (NH)	11	3	0.06%	0.02%
Other race alone (NH)	34	132	0.18%	0.67%
Mixed race or Multiracial (NH)	324	636	1.69%	3.21%
Hispanic or Latino (any race)	275	323	1.43%	1.63%
Total	19,184	19,790	100.00%	100.00%

=== 2020 census ===
As of the 2020 census, Old Jamestown had a population of 19,790. The median age was 47.6 years. 19.1% of residents were under the age of 18 and 21.3% of residents were 65 years of age or older. For every 100 females there were 89.2 males, and for every 100 females age 18 and over there were 86.5 males age 18 and over.

92.2% of residents lived in urban areas, while 7.8% lived in rural areas.

There were 7,570 households in Old Jamestown, of which 26.5% had children under the age of 18 living in them. Of all households, 51.8% were married-couple households, 13.9% were households with a male householder and no spouse or partner present, and 29.8% were households with a female householder and no spouse or partner present. About 23.1% of all households were made up of individuals and 10.4% had someone living alone who was 65 years of age or older.

There were 7,925 housing units, of which 4.5% were vacant. The homeowner vacancy rate was 1.1% and the rental vacancy rate was 13.1%.

Racial composition as of the 2020 census
Race	Number	Percent
White	4,877	24.6%
Black or African American	13,584	68.6%
American Indian and Alaska Native	31	0.2%
Asian	309	1.6%
Native Hawaiian and Other Pacific Islander	6	0.0%
Some other race	221	1.1%
Two or more races	762	3.9%
Hispanic or Latino (of any race)	323	1.6%

== Education ==
The vast majority of the CDP is in the Hazelwood School District. A small portion is in the Ferguson-Florissant School District.
