= Douglas Theater =

Douglas Theater may refer to:

- Kirk Douglas Theatre, a 317-seat theater located in Culver City, California built in 1946
- Douglas Theatre Company, an American movie theater chain which operated in Nebraska until closing in 2009
- Douglass Theatre, a theatre in Macon, Georgia founded in 1911 by Charles Henry Douglass
- Douglas Theater (Chicago), a 700-seat neighborhood theater in North Lawndale near Douglas Park from 1914-1950s
- Douglas Theater, a theater in Harlem at the site that became the Golden Gate Ballroom in 1939
