= Hazelwood School District =

School district in Missouri, United States

Location
- North St. Louis County, Missouri United States
- Coordinates: 38°49′49″N 90°18′55″W

District information
- Type: Public school district
- Motto: "High Expectations for All!"
- Grades: K through 12
- President: Sylvester Taylor II
- Superintendent: Dr. Bonita Jamison
- Budget: ~250,000,000 USD (2025-26)

Students and staff
- Students: ~16,000 (2025-26)
- Staff: ~2,100 (2025-26)
- Athletic conference: Suburban XII (North)

Other information
- District Map
- Website: http://www.hazelwoodschools.org/

Hazelwood School District (HSD) is a school district in suburban St. Louis, Missouri and is the second largest district in St. Louis County. The District extends from I-70 on the west and the I-270 bridge on the east, covering 78 square miles, an area larger than the City of St. Louis. Its northern and southern boundaries are the two Great Rivers, the Missouri and the Mississippi, and I-270.

The District covers a large portion of north St. Louis County, Missouri, including all of Black Jack and Spanish Lake. Additionally it includes portions of: Bellefontaine Neighbors, Berkeley, Bridgeton, Dellwood, Ferguson, Florissant, Glasgow Village, Hazelwood, and Old Jamestown.

The district is headquartered in an unincorporated area; the district headquarters has a Florissant address, but is not in that city.

Faculty and staff educate more than 18,000 students in the district's 20 elementary schools, 6 middle schools and 3 high schools, plus separate campuses for early childhood, gifted, and individualized learning.

The Hazelwood School District is accredited by the Missouri Department of Elementary and Secondary Education.

== History ==
The Hazelwood School district was involved in Hazelwood School District v. Kuhlmeier, a 1988 landmark U.S. Supreme Court case which ruled that public school curricular student newspapers that have not been established as forums for student expression are subject to a lower level of First Amendment protection than independent student expression or newspapers established (by policy or practice) as forums for student expression. The school district was also involved in Hazelwood School District v. United States, a 1977 U.S. Supreme Court case concerning employment discrimination.

In 1977 a history of the Hazelwood School District was published and compiled by Gregory M. Franzwa.

In 2016 Hazelwood School District School Board announced a plan to save the district $6.6 million. Included in the plan was staff cuts to the elementary band and orchestra classes, reduced physical education classes for elementary students, and field trip funding will be eliminated. District officials said a 22 percent drop in assessed property values led to the cuts.

In 2022, radioactive materials including lead-210, polonium, and radium, were found at the district's Jana Elementary School. It arose from dumps of munitions during World War II at St. Louis Lambert International Airport, and had flowed from there in Cold Water Creek to the school which lies in its floodplain. On October 18, it was announced that Jana Elementary School would be temporarily closed, and its classes will switch to online learning until the end of the semester, where the student body will be divided into other local schools until Jana is reopened. Follow-up testing found that while low levels of radioactive material were present at Jana, the levels were safe and did not exceed naturally occurring background levels present at other schools. Nevertheless, in April 2023, Senator Josh Hawley sponsored a bill to perform a federal cleanup of the school that passed the Senate with unanimous consent. In 2024, the district's board voted to change the name of the former elementary school to the "Hazelwood School District Logistics Center", and to repurpose the building as a storage facility.

== Schools ==
The district contains 19 elementary schools, 6 middle schools, and 3 high schools.

Elementary Schools

- Armstrong
- Arrowpoint
- Barrington
- Brown
- Cold Water
- Garrett
- Grannemann
- Jamestown
- Jury
- Keeven
- Larimore
- Lawson
- Lusher
- McCurdy
- McNair
- Russell
- Townsend
- Twillman
- Walker

Middle Schools

- Hazelwood Northwest Middle School
- Hazelwood West Middle School
- Hazelwood East Middle School
- Hazelwood Southeast Middle School
- Hazelwood North Middle School
- Hazelwood Central Middle School

High Schools

- Central
- East
- West
