= Riverview Gardens School District =

School district in Missouri

Location
- 1317 Northumberland Drive; Saint Louis, Missouri postal address United States

District information
- Superintendent: Dr. Scott Spurgeon

Students and staff
- Students: 5,200 (As of 2012)
- Teachers: 1,000 (As of 2012)

Other information

Riverview Gardens School District is a public school district in north St. Louis County, Missouri, United States.

The district includes all of the following: the municipalities of Riverview and Moline Acres and the census-designated place of Castle Point. It also includes most of the following: the municipalities of Bellefontaine Neighbors and Dellwood, and the CDP of Glasgow Village, and portions of the following municipalities: Ferguson and Jennings.

The district has 13 schools within the district: 10 elementary schools, two middle schools, and one high school. Riverview Gardens is a Title One school district: all students receive free or reduced lunch. The school district is currently unaccredited but has received a provisional unit 2020. The average teacher salary is $49,000.

== List of schools ==
High schools

- Riverview Gardens High School

Middle schools

- Central Middle School
- Westview Middle School

Elementary schools

- Danforth Elementary School
- Gibson Elementary School
- Glasgow Trails Elementary School
- Gibson Elementary School
- Koch Elementary School
- Leamasters Elementary School
- Lewis and Clark Elementary School
- Meadows Elementary School
- Moline Elementary School
