= Spanish Lake (film) =

- Theatrical film poster
- Directed by: Phillip Andrew Morton
- Produced by: Phillip Andrew Morton; Matt Jordan Smith
- Cinematography: Alden Sargent
- Music by: Phillip Andrew Morton; Justin Bell; Chris Thom
- Production companies: Amberdale Productions; Spanish Lake Film Production
- Release date: June 13, 2014 (United States)
- Running time: 78 minutes
- Country: United States
- Language: English

Spanish Lake is a 2014 American documentary film directed by Phillip Andrew Morton and co-produced by Phillip Andrew Morton and Matt Jordan Smith. The film premiered theatrically in St. Louis, Missouri on June 13, 2014. The documentary chronicles the area of Spanish Lake, Missouri and its transformation from a 1950s white suburb to a mostly black population through a process known as white flight. The themes of the film parallel America's growing political divide, underlying racism, and rise of anti-government sentiment.

After strong ticket sales in St. Louis, the film received a limited release in Los Angeles and Dallas. Further theatrical expansion was halted in St. Louis in August 2014 after the shooting of Mike Brown in Ferguson, Missouri. Due to racial tensions in the city, Wehrenberg Theatres pulled the film from its planned release on September 5, 2014. The suppression of the film led to national media coverage, including an article by Deadline Hollywood. Spanish Lake was released to Video on demand on October 21, 2014, to critical acclaim. The DVD release came a month later on November 15, 2014.

== Background and development ==
The idea for the project germinated from a visit director Phillip Andrew Morton took to his childhood home in Spanish Lake in September 2007. Finding the house abandoned as well as his school and church, he began to research the history of white flight in the St. Louis metropolitan area. Using his own money to launch the project, Spanish Lake began filming in April 2011 after Morton saw a Facebook event announcing the reunion of a group of former residents of Spanish Lake. Further funding for the film was found via a Kickstarter campaign in June 2011. Filming wrapped up in May 2013.

== Summary ==
Spanish Lake was named after the Spanish troops who stayed there while building a fortified post for Spain in 1768. The first American military installation in the Louisiana Territory, Fort Bellefontaine, was built there after famed explorers Lewis & Clark camped on the land at the start and end of their trip (1804–1806). Spanish Lake was a rural farming community for many years, until the 1950s when neighborhoods of tract housing were built. The area became a rural refuge from St. Louis city and received an exclusively white population. The 1970s saw the proliferation of dense apartment housing to Spanish Lake. African-Americans fleeing the failed Pruitt-Igoe public housing high rises in the city moved into the apartments via the Section 8 voucher system which immediately struck racial tensions in the area, particularly in local schools. The 1990s saw a mass exodus of the white population, spurred on by blockbusting, a practice some U.S. real estate agents use to encourage white property owners to sell their houses quickly at a loss, implying the African-Americans moving into their neighborhood will depress their property values. The film begins in 2011, when a group of former residents known as the “Lakers”, revisit Spanish Lake for a reunion.

== Controversy ==
Spanish Lake was quick to receive attention from the St. Louis media, as early as 2012 when many news stations announced its filming. The strong buzz surrounded the controversial subject matter of white flight, a topic that received little coverage due to its taboo nature.

The trailer for the film was noticeably controversial as one interviewee states that some people would say: “I don’t have a problem with black people, it’s just n-----s.”

Two months after its release, Mike Brown was shot by police in Ferguson, a neighboring suburb only five miles away from Spanish Lake. The controversy of the film, the proximity of the two areas, and the ensuing Ferguson riots led to Wehrenberg Theatres banning the film from their theaters in August 2014. The films’ producer said to the Riverfront Times that the theater chain was “afraid of showing a film that shines a spotlight on the issues underlying the issues that are happening in Ferguson”.

== Critical reception ==
Spanish Lake received positive response from critics. Review aggregator Rotten Tomatoes reports that 80% of 5 film critics have given the film a positive review, with a rating average of 8.1 out of 10.

A June 2014 Huffington Post review called Spanish Lake “an honest film....and it isn’t always pretty.” Michael O’Sullivan of the Washington Post said “it feels like a portrait of America” and “it is likely that the racial tension in Spanish Lake shares a root system with what’s happening eight miles away in Ferguson.” A Village Voice review called the film “revelatory and urgently relevant” and “captures something rarely seen on screen: The way many white people act just before they say something about race that they think maybe they shouldn’t.” Writer Peter Keough of The Boston Globe reviewed Spanish Lake as “a thoughtful, even-handed account of the rise and fall of the title Missouri community.”

Scott Mendelson of Forbes listed the film on his “Great Films You Missed in 2014”.

== Soundtrack ==
- The Hookman - “This Is My Life” (music and lyrics by John Lechner)

== Legacy ==
In May 2014, the United States Department of Housing and Urban Development hosted a screening of the film at their national headquarters in Washington, D.C. After the Ferguson riots, the film was screened by many prestigious schools such as Washington University in St. Louis. UCLA has used the film in their Urban Planning courses.
