= Linmark Associates, Inc. v. Township of Willingboro =

Linmark Associates, Inc., v. Township of Willingboro
- Supreme Court of the United States

Argued March 2, 1977 Decided May 2, 1977
- Full case name: Linmark Associates, Inc., et al. v. Township of Willingboro et al.
- Citations: 431 U.S. 85 (more) 97 S. Ct. 1614; 52 L. Ed. 2d 155; 1977 U.S. LEXIS 81

Case history
- Prior: Unpublished district court decision reversed, 535 F.2d 786 (3rd Cir. 1976); cert. granted, 429 U.S. 938 (1976).

Holding
- Local ordinance prohibiting the posting of "for sale" and "sold" signs on real estate violated First Amendment protections of commercial speech.

Court membership
- Chief Justice Warren E. Burger Associate Justices William J. Brennan Jr. · Potter Stewart; Byron White · Thurgood Marshall; Harry Blackmun · Lewis F. Powell Jr. William Rehnquist · John P. Stevens

Case opinion
- Majority: Marshall, joined by Burger, Brennan, Stewart, White, Blackmun, Powell, Stevens
- Rehnquist took no part in the consideration or decision of the case.

Laws applied
- U.S. Const. amend. I

Linmark Associates, Inc. v. Township of Willingboro, 431 U.S. 85 (1977), was a case in which the Supreme Court of the United States found that an ordinance prohibiting the posting of "for sale" and "sold" signs on real estate within the town violated the First Amendment to the United States Constitution protections for commercial speech.

== Background ==
Willingboro Township, New Jersey, had been experiencing a shift in its demographics during the 1960s as the proportion of its non-white population increased from less than 1% to 18.2% in 1973. Concerned that white flight might occur, it enacted an ordinance in 1974 that prohibited its residents from having a "for sale" or "sold" sign on any real estate within the township. During the 1960s and 1970s, many communities in the United States had enacted similar laws in response to the practices of blockbusting. It was believed that by preventing the posting of these signs, residents would not know if a large number of white homeowners were attempting to sell their houses and move from the township at the same time. The intent of such laws was to prevent panic selling and to allow integration in a more gradual manner.

Linmark Associates owned property that was for sale when the ordinance was passed, and filed suit in federal district court seeking declaratory and injunctive relief. The district court granted a declaration of unconstitutionality of the ordinance, but on appeal a divided Court of Appeals for the Third Circuit reversed the decision of the district court. The case was then appealed to the Supreme Court.

== Court's Decision ==
The Supreme Court had recently recognized that commercial speech had some protection in Bigelow v. Virginia, in which the Court struck down a Virginia statute prohibiting the advertisement of out-of-state abortion procedures, and in Virginia State Pharmacy Board v. Virginia Citizens Consumer Council, which struck down a statute forbidding the advertisement of prescription drug prices. Justice Marshall's decision noted that the Willingboro ordinance did not genuinely regulate the time or manner of the communication, but its content, since other signs were permitted. Rather, Willingboro proscribed particular signs, those stating "for sale" or "sold," because the township feared that the signs will cause those residents reading them to act upon them. As such, the township's ordinance was essentially the same as the situation in Virginia State Pharmacy Board, where a statute was intended to keep information from the public. Although the purpose of the Willingboro law was to prevent irrational decisionmaking by white homeowners by keeping information on the status of real estate from them, the First Amendment does not permit the government to make such a statute. The opinion says that when there is a choice between suppressing information and the danger of its misuse if it is freely available, then the remedy under the First Amendment is more speech and not enforced silence. As there was no meaningful difference between the township's ordinance and the statute overturned in the Virginia State Pharmacy Board case, the Court concluded that the Willingboro violated the First Amendment.

Justice Rehnquist did not participate in the decision. His had been the lone dissenting opinion in the Virginia State Pharmacy Board case, stating that the free speech protection of the First Amendment should be limited to social and political issues.

== See also ==
- List of United States Supreme Court cases, volume 431
