= Castle Point, Missouri =

- Unincorporated community Census-designated place
- Location of Castle Point, Missouri
- Coordinates: 38°45′20″N 90°15′10″W
- Country: United States
- State: Missouri
- County: St. Louis
- Township: St. Ferdinand

Area
  - Total: 0.61 sq mi (1.57 km^{2})
  - Land: 0.61 sq mi (1.57 km^{2})
  - Water: 0 sq mi (0.00 km^{2})
- Elevation: 482 ft (147 m)

Population (2020)
  - Total: 2,815
  - Density: 4,632.2/sq mi (1,788.52/km^{2})
- Time zone: UTC-6 (Central (CST))
  - Summer (DST): UTC-5 (CDT)
- ZIP code: 63136
- Area code: 314
- FIPS code: 29-11908
- GNIS feature ID: 2393368

Castle Point is an unincorporated community and census-designated place (CDP) in St. Ferdinand Township, St. Louis County, Missouri, United States. The population was 2,815 at the 2020 census.

== Geography ==
According to the United States Census Bureau, the CDP has a total area of 0.7 square miles (1.8 km^{2}), all land.

== Demographics ==
Historical population
Census	Pop.	Note	%±
2000	4,559		—
2010	3,962		−13.1%
2020	2,815		−29.0%
U.S. Decennial Census

=== Racial and ethnic composition ===
Castle Point, Missouri – Racial and ethnic composition Note: the US Census treats Hispanic/Latino as an ethnic category. This table excludes Latinos from the racial categories and assigns them to a separate category. Hispanics/Latinos may be of any race.
Race / Ethnicity (NH = Non-Hispanic)	Pop 2000	Pop 2010	Pop 2020	% 2000	% 2010	% 2020
White alone (NH)	428	186	119	9.39%	4.69%	4.23%
Black or African American alone (NH)	4,038	3,680	2,532	88.57%	92.88%	89.95%
Native American or Alaska Native alone (NH)	13	3	4	0.29%	0.08%	0.14%
Asian alone (NH)	2	11	5	0.04%	0.28%	0.18%
Native Hawaiian or Pacific Islander alone (NH)	0	0	0	0.00%	0.00%	0.00%
Other race alone (NH)	2	0	18	0.04%	0.00%	0.64%
Mixed race or Multiracial (NH)	57	60	83	1.25%	1.51%	2.95%
Hispanic or Latino (any race)	19	22	54	0.42%	0.56%	1.92%
Total	4,559	3,962	2,815	100.00%	100.00%	100.00%

=== 2020 census ===
As of the 2020 census, Castle Point had a population of 2,815. The median age was 34.0 years. 29.7% of residents were under the age of 18 and 15.4% were 65 years of age or older. For every 100 females there were 84.6 males, and for every 100 females age 18 and over there were 76.6 males age 18 and over.

100.0% of residents lived in urban areas, while 0.0% lived in rural areas.

There were 994 households in Castle Point, of which 39.1% had children under the age of 18 living in them. Of all households, 21.2% were married-couple households, 20.4% were households with a male householder and no spouse or partner present, and 49.5% were households with a female householder and no spouse or partner present. About 25.4% of all households were made up of individuals and 10.4% had someone living alone who was 65 years of age or older.

There were 1,297 housing units, of which 23.4% were vacant. The homeowner vacancy rate was 0.4% and the rental vacancy rate was 11.2%.

=== 2010 census ===
As of the 2010 census, Castle Point had a population of 3,962. The ethnic makeup of the population was 92.9% non-Hispanic African-American, 4.7% non-Hispanic white, 0.1% Native American, 0.3% Asian, 1.6% from two or more races and 0.6% Hispanic or Latino.

=== 2000 census ===
At the 2000 census there were 4,559 people, 1,408 households, and 1,163 families in the CDP. The population density was 6,653.9 inhabitants per square mile (2,569.1/km^{2}). There were 1,571 housing units at an average density of 2,292.9 per square mile (885.3/km^{2}). The racial makeup of the CDP was 9.54% White, 88.66% African American, 0.31% Native American, 0.04% Asian, 0.04% from other races, and 1.40% from two or more races. Hispanic or Latino of any race were 0.42%.

Of the 1,408 households 44.4% had children under the age of 18 living with them, 36.7% were married couples living together, 40.0% had a female householder with no husband present, and 17.4% were non-families. 14.8% of households were one person and 3.7% were one person aged 65 or older. The average household size was 3.24 and the average family size was 3.55.

The age distribution was 37.6% under the age of 18, 9.6% from 18 to 24, 25.9% from 25 to 44, 20.7% from 45 to 64, and 6.3% 65 or older. The median age was 27 years. For every 100 females, there were 85.0 males. For every 100 females age 18 and over, there were 75.8 males.

The median household income was $31,081 and the median family income was $33,281. Males had a median income of $29,919 versus $21,113 for females. The per capita income for the CDP was $11,386. About 22.6% of families and 24.6% of the population were below the poverty line, including 36.4% of those under age 18 and 18.3% of those age 65 or over.

== Education ==
The CDP is in the Riverview Gardens School District. Riverview Gardens High School is the district's comprehensive high school.
