= Marcus Corporation =

American publicly held company

The Marcus Corporation
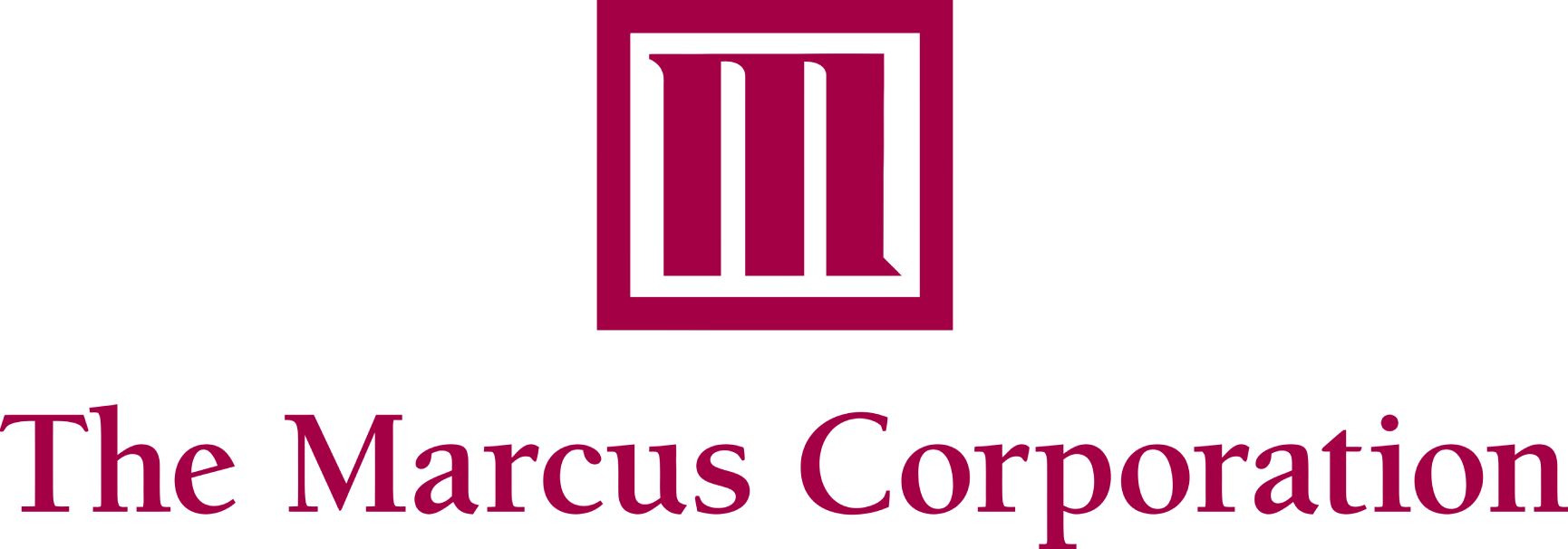
- Company type: Public
- Traded as: NYSE: MCS; S&P 600 Component
- Industry: Hospitality; Entertainment
- Founded: November 1, 1935; 90 years ago in Milwaukee, Wisconsin, United States
- Founder: Ben Marcus
- Headquarters: 111 E. Kilbourn Ave, Suite 1200, Milwaukee, Wisconsin, United States
- Number of locations: 95 (2023)
- Area served: Marcus Theatres: Wisconsin, Illinois, Iowa, Minnesota, Missouri, Nebraska, North Dakota, Ohio and Pennsylvania. Marcus Hotels and Resorts: Arizona, California, Illinois, Minnesota, Missouri, Nevada, Ohio, Oklahoma, Texas, and Wisconsin.
- Key people: Gregory S. Marcus (president and CEO); Stephen H. Marcus (chairman)
- Revenue: ▲US$692.1 million (2023)
- Operating income: ▲US$75.6 million (2017)
- Net income: ▲US$2.29 per share (2017)
- Number of employees: 7,500
- Divisions: Marcus Theatres; Marcus Hotels and Resorts
- Website: www.marcuscorp.com

The Marcus Corporation is an American publicly traded company headquartered in Milwaukee, Wisconsin. The company operates two principal divisions: Marcus Theatres and Marcus Hotels and Resorts.

== History ==
Marcus Corporation was founded on November 1, 1935 by Ben Marcus with the purchase of a single movie theatre screen in Ripon, Wisconsin. This movie theatre remains with Marcus as a first run theater, the Campus Cinema (near Ripon College), with titles appealing to both adults and families. It was also a restaurant franchisee, operating the Marc's Big Boy affiliate of the Big Boy Restaurants chain and serving as the Milwaukee area franchise for Kentucky Fried Chicken. Marcus sold the KFC franchises by 1992 and closed the last Marc's in 1995.

One of the company's principal assets, Baymont Inn & Suites, was sold to La Quinta Corporation in 2003. Marcus Cable, which merged in 1998 with Charter Communications, was founded by a member of the Marcus family, but held no direct corporate connection to Marcus Corporation itself.

== Marcus Theatres ==
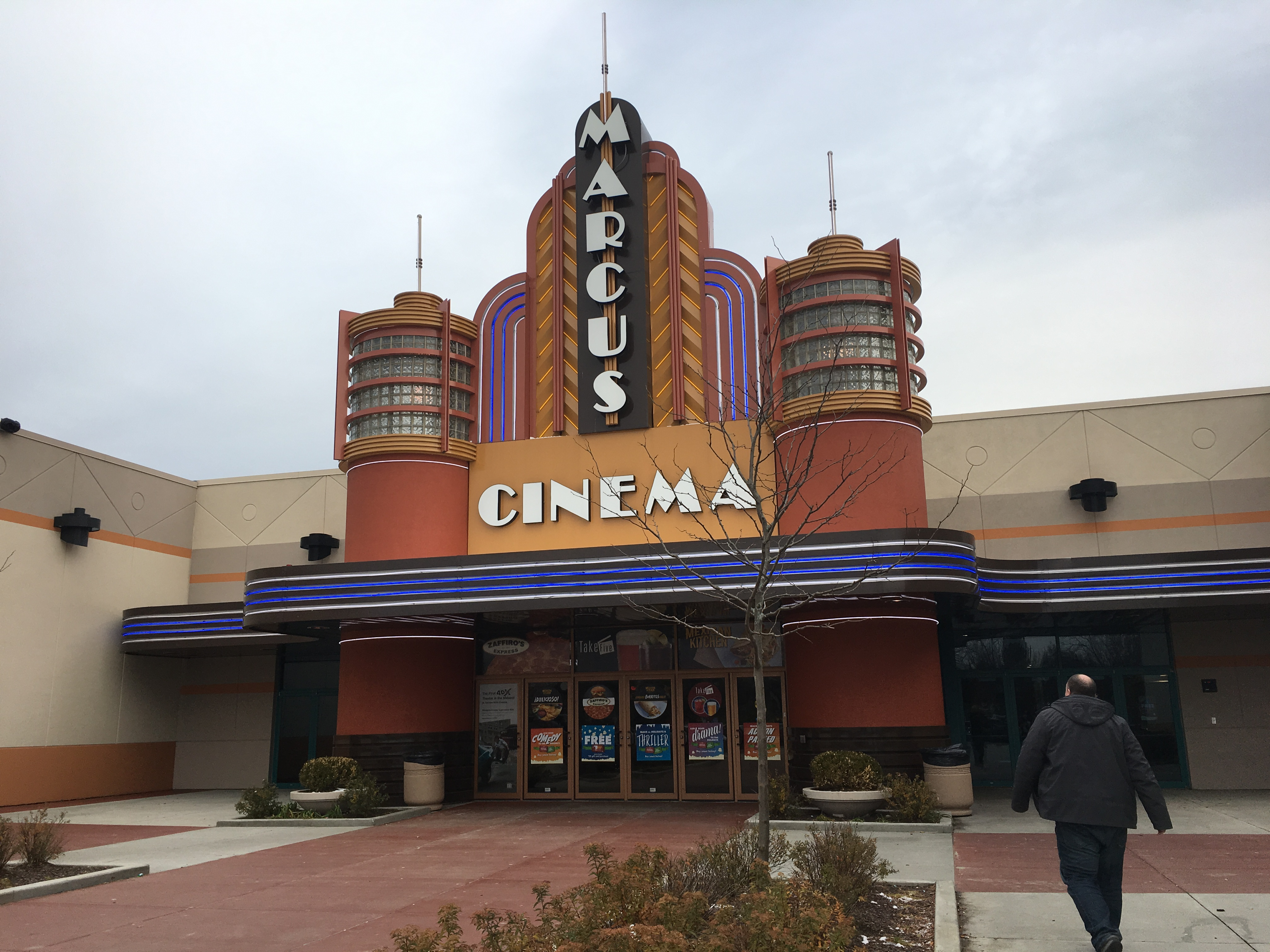
The Marcus Gurnee Mills Cinema in Gurnee, Illinois in 2018, the chain's flagship Chicagoland multiplex.

Marcus Theatres is an American movie theater chain that owns and/or manages screens and has food service. As of September 30, 2023, Marcus Theatres has 79 theaters and 993 screens in 17 U.S. states.

In 2000, the chain partnered with MovieTickets.com for advanced ticketing capabilities. This partnership was extended in 2011.

In 2008, Marcus acquired seven theater locations in Nebraska from Douglas Theatre Company.

In August 2013, Rolando B. Rodriguez was appointed as president and chief executive officer of Marcus Theatres. After Rodriguez took over, the company introduced two new initiatives in October 2013: $5 admission for any movie on Tuesdays at select theaters and an alternative programming block known as "Theatre Entertainment Network. In January 2014, Marcus launched an initiative called "Indie Focus" that offers art and independent films in select locations. The chain began a partnership with Fandango in fall 2015, making Fandango its preferred ticketing partner.

In December 2016, the chain completed its acquisition of 14 theaters owned by Wehrenberg Theatres in four states.

Marcus closed all Marcus Cinemas and Movie Tavern theaters after 8:30 p.m. showtimes on March 17, 2020 indefinitely, due to the impact of the COVID-19 pandemic on cinema and following the closures of competitors. Marcus Theaters chairman, president and CEO Rolando Rodriguez pledged full cooperation with the Center for Disease Control (CDC). The chain began a slow-process reopening in late June 2020 with several theaters, before a wider reopening started rolling out on August 21, 2020 to take advantage of the wide release for Tenet. With that film underperforming and new product being held back as another case surge in Wisconsin happened, Marcus began to re-close some theaters and reduce others to weekend and Tuesday operations only by the start of October. It also later pushed the redemption period for refills of its annual low-cost 'unlimited refills' 2020 reusable popcorn bucket for the entirety of 2021.

=== Movie Tavern ===
The first Movie Tavern location opened in 2001 in Fort Worth, Texas by Dennis Butler. In 2013, Movie Tavern was acquired by New Orleans-based Southern Theatres. Movie Tavern has become one of the largest and fastest-growing in-theatre dining concepts in the United States thanks to its praised menu and unique offerings.

In November 2018, Marcus Theaters acquired Movie Tavern from Southern Theaters, causing the chain to expand into Arkansas, Colorado, Georgia, Kentucky, Louisiana, New York, Pennsylvania, Texas, and Virginia. The acquisition was valued at $126 million sold in cash and stock, (NYSE: MCS). The deal closed in February 2019. The deal added 22 locations and 208 screens, increasing Marcus Theaters locations to 90 theaters in 17 states, representing a 23% increase in Marcus Theatres' total screen count.

== Marcus Hotels and Resorts ==
Marcus Hotels and Resorts, currently owns or manages 17 hotels and resorts in California, Illinois, Minnesota, Nebraska, Nevada, Oklahoma, Texas, and Wisconsin, as well as one vacation club in Wisconsin.

== See also ==
- Hilton Milwaukee City Center
