= Blockbusting =

Manipulation of racist attitudes for real estate profit

Blockbusting is a business practice in the United States in which real estate agents and building developers convinced residents in a particular area to sell their property at below-market prices. This was achieved by fearmongering the homeowners, telling them that racial minorities would soon be moving into their neighborhoods. The blockbusters would then sell those same houses at inflated prices to black families seeking upward mobility.

Blockbusting became prominent after post-World War II bans on explicitly segregationist real estate practices. By the 1980s it had mostly disappeared in the United States after changes to the law and real estate market.

Research has documented how blockbusting harmed black wealth accumulation and contributed to the racial wealth gap, as homes bought by black households depreciated or stagnated in value.

== History ==
From 1900 to 1970, around six million African Americans from the rural Southern United States moved to industrial and urban cities in the Northern and Western United States during the Great Migration in an effort to avoid the Jim Crow laws, violence, bigotry, and limited opportunities of the South. Resettlement to these cities peaked during World War I and World War II as slowing immigration from Europe created a labor shortage in northern and western cities. To fill war industries and shipyards, these cities recruited tens of thousands of black and white people, including those from the South. Resistance to this loss of cheap labor in the South meant that northern recruiters had to act in secret or face fines or imprisonment. Southern authorities tried to prevent black flight by arresting migrants at railroad stations and arresting them on the grounds of vagrancy. Racial and class antagonisms heightened across the urban United States as a result of this influx of black residents, and in part owing to the overcrowding of cities. The Great Migration highlighted racial divisions of the North that black Americans so desperately tried to flee from in the South: police killings of unarmed African American men and inequalities and biases in employment, housing, health care, and education. As black soldiers returned home in the aftermath of World War I and World War II, they struggled to find adequate housing and jobs in the cities that they had left. They were confined to the most decrepit and oldest housing stock in the least desirable yet most densely populated areas. The areas that non-whites were allowed to live in were substandard. This was in part because of the overcrowding, which was exacerbated by the Great Migration. Often, several families were crowded into one unit. Because non-whites were confined to these small areas of the city, landlords were able to exploit their residents by charging high rents and ignoring repairs. In addition to being refused equal access to the housing market, blacks were relegated to the lowest-paying, more dangerous jobs as well as being barred from joining many unions. Some companies would only hire these returning veterans and other black workers as strikebreakers, widening the divide between black and white workers further.

Housing in the United States had been segregated for a long time historically, this was not a new idea or reality. In an attempt to continue the path of racial segregation in housing, white homeowners in many U.S. cities regarded blacks as a social and economic threat to their neighborhoods and to maintaining racial homogeneity. Groups of black people would have to join forces and combine income to buy a residency, in turn when they sold their house, it would become cheaper and other black groups could then afford housing. Redlining also made it difficult to afford housing in good areas, which had a direct link to poor education. If blacks moved into a neighborhood, home values in that neighborhood would decrease as a result of federal and local policies. Since white homeowners took great pride in their homes and often viewed them as their life investment, they deeply feared that allowing one black family to move into their neighborhood would ruin their investments. To prevent their neighborhoods from becoming racially mixed, many cities kept their neighborhoods segregated with local zoning laws. Such laws required people of non-white ethnic groups to reside in geographically defined areas of the town or city, preventing them from moving to areas inhabited by whites. Restrictive covenants were also introduced in response to the influx of black migrants during the Great Migration and constituted clauses written into deeds that prohibited African Americans from buying, leasing, or living in white neighborhoods.

This belief in the need to maintain neighborhood homogeneity was a present theme in both racist attitudes and legislation. In 1934, the National Housing Act was signed into law by President Franklin D. Roosevelt, establishing the Federal Housing Administration (FHA). The FHA was commissioned by the Home Owners' Loan Corporation (HOLC) to look at 239 cities and create "residential security maps" to indicate the level of security for real-estate investments in each surveyed city. These maps marked neighborhoods by quality from 'A' to 'D', with 'A' representing the higher-income neighborhoods and 'D' representing the lower-income neighborhoods. Neighborhoods with some black population were given a 'D' rating and residents of those areas were refused loans. This practice, called redlining, gave whites an economic incentive to keep blacks out of their communities.

In 1917, in the case of Buchanan v. Warley, the Supreme Court of the United States voided the racial residency statutes that forbade blacks from living in white neighborhoods. The court ruled that the statutes violated the Equal Protection Clause of the Fourteenth Amendment to the United States Constitution. However, whites found a loophole in this case by using racially restrictive covenants in deeds, and real estate businesses informally applied them to prevent the sale of houses to black Americans in white neighborhoods. To thwart the Supreme Court's Buchanan v. Warley prohibition of such legal business racism, state courts interpreted the covenants as a contract between private persons, outside the scope of the Fourteenth Amendment. However, in the Shelley v. Kraemer case in 1948, the Supreme Court ruled that the amendment's Equal Protection Clause outlawed the states' legal enforcement of racially restrictive covenants in state courts. In this event, decades of segregation practices were annulled, which had compelled blacks to live in overcrowded and over-priced ghettos. Freed by the Supreme Court from the legal restrictions, it became possible for non-whites to buy homes that had previously been reserved for white residents.

Generally, "blockbusting" denotes the real estate and building development business practices which both profit and are fueled by anti-black racism. Real estate companies used deceitful tactics to make white homeowners think that their neighborhoods were being "invaded" by non-white residents, which in turn would encourage them to quickly sell their houses at below-market prices. The companies then sold that property to blacks who were desperate to escape inner-city ghettos at higher-than-market prices.

Owing to redlining, African-Americans usually did not qualify for mortgages from banks and savings and loan associations. Instead, they resorted to land installment contracts at above market rates to buy a house. Land installment contracts were historically predatory agreements in which buyers made payments directly to sellers over a period of time in order to obtain the legal title to the home only when the full purchase price had been paid. The harsh terms of these contracts and inflated prices often led to foreclosure, so these houses had a high turnover rate. With blockbusting, real estate companies legally profited from the arbitrage, the difference between the discounted price paid to frightened white sellers and the artificially high price paid by black buyers whose houses were often foreclosed on as a result of these unfair contracts. They also profited from the commissions resulting from increased real estate sales and their higher-than-market financing of house sales to blacks.

=== 21st century ===
In 2016, the Lakewood Township, New Jersey called on the United States Department of Justice to investigate allegations of blockbusting by Haredi Orthodox Jews. The New Jersey Attorney General subsequently declined to investigate the allegations.

== Methods ==
The term blockbusting might have originated in Chicago, Illinois, where real estate companies and building developers used agents provocateurs. These were non-white people hired to deceive the white residents of a neighborhood into believing that black people were moving into their neighborhood. The houses that became vacant in that way enabled accelerated immigration of economically successful racial minority residents to better neighborhoods beyond the ghettos. The white residents were encouraged to quickly sell, at a loss, and emigrate to more racially homogeneous suburbs. Blockbusting was most prevalent on the West Side and South Side of Chicago, and also was heavily practiced in Bedford–Stuyvesant, Brooklyn, New York City; in the West Oak Lane and Germantown neighborhoods of Northwest Philadelphia; and on the East Side of Cleveland.

The tactics included:

- hiring black women to be seen pushing baby carriages in white neighborhoods to encourage white fear of devalued property
- hiring black men to drive through white neighborhoods with their radios blasting
- hiring black youth to stage street brawls in front of white homes to generate feelings of an unsafe atmosphere
- selling a house to a black family in a middle-class white neighborhood to provoke white flight, before the community's property values decline considerably
- saturating the neighborhood area with fliers offering quick cash for houses
- developers buying houses and buildings, leaving them unoccupied to make the neighborhood appear abandoned – like a ghetto or a slum

Such practices can be described as psychological manipulation that usually frightened the remaining white residents into selling their homes at a loss. After utilizing one of the tactics above, real estate agents would place their cards in the mailboxes of frightened white residents, offering to buy their houses immediately at a discounted price. These agents aimed to convince white property owners that their home values would decline, owing to the influx of new minorities onto their blocks. After these white homeowners hurriedly sold their homes, middle-class African Americans were then offered admittance into white neighborhoods that had previously been denied to them at artificially inflated prices. Given the lack of housing options available to black buyers, many had no choice but to pay these exorbitant costs.

Blockbusting was very common and profitable. For example, by 1962, when blockbusting had been a common practice for some fifteen years, the city of Chicago had more than 100 real estate companies that had been, on average, "changing" two to three blocks a week.

== Reactions ==
In 1962, "blockbusting" – real estate profiteering – was nationally exposed by The Saturday Evening Post with the article "Confessions of a Block-Buster," which explained how realtors gained profit by frightening white Americans to sell at a loss, in order to quickly resettle to racially segregated "better neighborhoods." In response to political pressure from sellers and buyers, states and cities legally restricted door-to-door real estate solicitation, the posting of "FOR SALE" signs, and authorized government licensing agencies to investigate the blockbusting complaints of buyers and sellers in order to revoke the real estate sales licenses of blockbusters. Likewise, other states' legislation allowed lawsuits against real estate companies and brokers who cheated buyers and sellers with fraudulent representations of declining property values, changing racial and ethnic neighborhood populations, increasing crime rates, and the "worsening" of schools, as results of racial mixing.

The Fair Housing Act of 1968 established federal causes of action against blockbusting, including illegal real estate broker claims that non-white people had or were going to move into a neighborhood, and so devalue the properties. The Office of Fair Housing and Equal Opportunity was charged with the task of administering and enforcing this law. In the case of Jones v. Alfred H. Mayer Co. (1968), the U.S. Supreme Court ruled that the Thirteenth Amendment authorized the federal government's prohibiting of racial discrimination in private housing markets. It thereby allowed black American legal claims to rescind the usurious land contracts (featuring over-priced houses and higher-than-market mortgage interest rates), as a discriminatory real estate business practice illegal under the Civil Rights Act of 1866, thus greatly reducing the profitability of blockbusting. Nevertheless, these regulatory and statutory remedies against blockbusting were challenged in court. As a result, it was decided that towns cannot prohibit an owner from placing a "FOR SALE" sign before their house, even if prohibiting this practice reduces blockbusting. In the case of Linmark Associates, Inc. v. Willingboro (1977), the Supreme Court ruled that such prohibitions infringed on the freedom of expression. Moreover, by the 1980s, as evidence of blockbusting practices disappeared, states and cities began rescinding statutes restricting blockbusting.

One of the long-term consequences of blockbusting was the onset of white flight and artificial demand for white-only suburbs. Blockbusting engineered pre-emptive white flight from city neighborhoods and steered Black residents with less free income and opportunities into the vacancies, thereby self-fulfilling its own prophecies and justifying white flight post-facto. White flight significantly decreased cities' municipal tax revenues and impeded cities' ability to provide minority residents, who were often prevented from fleeing to the suburbs alongside their white peers, with adequate civil services. This was coupled with increased tax rates that city governments imposed on said residents, who were often forced to remain in the city due to discriminatory government and private industry practices, in an attempt to try and make up for the reductions in the tax base caused by white flight, further exacerbating the precarious social and financial positions imposed upon non-white city residents.

== Popular culture ==
The acclaimed but short-lived dramatic television series East Side, West Side (1963–1964) deals with this issue in the episode "No Place to Hide," tracing the evolution of two couples, one black, one white; the latter ostensibly champions the cause of the former as unscrupulous realtors attempt to 'block-bust' their newly integrated suburban neighborhood.

The serious-comic television series All in the Family (1971–1979) featured "The Blockbuster" (Season 2, episode 8) a 1971 episode about the practice, illustrating some real estate blockbusting techniques.

In the 2011 historical fantasy novel Redwood and Wildfire, author Andrea Hairston depicts actors being hired for blockbusting in Chicago, as well as the sense of betrayal experienced by others when they realized some black people were getting rich by participating in these exploitative schemes.

The 2014 documentary Spanish Lake describes how blockbusting happened in the St Louis suburb of Spanish Lake, Missouri.

Blockbusting is portrayed in the 2021 Amazon Video series Them.

In the American sitcom The Wonder Years (2021), the episode "Blockbusting" explicitly talks about the phenomenon.

== See also ==
- Black flight
- Inclusionary zoning
- Institutional discrimination in the housing market
- Institutional racism
- Mortgage discrimination
- Office of Fair Housing and Equal Opportunity
- Planned shrinkage
- Racism
- Redlining
- Urban renewal
- White flight
