= Glasgow Village, Missouri =

- Unincorporated community Census-designated place
- Location of Glasgow Village, Missouri
- Coordinates: 38°45′28″N 90°11′54″W
- Country: United States
- State: Missouri
- County: St. Louis
- Township: St. Ferdinand

Area
  - Total: 0.96 sq mi (2.48 km^{2})
  - Land: 0.96 sq mi (2.48 km^{2})
  - Water: 0 sq mi (0.00 km^{2})
- Elevation: 472 ft (144 m)

Population (2020)
  - Total: 4,584
  - Density: 4,784.5/sq mi (1,847.31/km^{2})
- Time zone: UTC-6 (Central (CST))
  - Summer (DST): UTC-5 (CDT)
- ZIP code: 63137
- Area code: 314
- FIPS code: 29-27226
- GNIS feature ID: 2393018

Glasgow Village is an unincorporated community and census-designated place (CDP) in St. Ferdinand Township, St. Louis County, Missouri, United States. The population was 4,584 at the 2020 census.

== Geography ==
According to the United States Census Bureau, the CDP has a total area of 0.9 square miles (2.3 km^{2}), all land.

== Demographics ==
Historical population
Census	Pop.	Note	%±
2000	5,234		—
2010	5,429		3.7%
2020	4,584		−15.6%
U.S. Decennial Census

=== Racial and ethnic composition ===
Glasgow Village CDP, Missouri – Racial and ethnic composition Note: the US Census treats Hispanic/Latino as an ethnic category. This table excludes Latinos from the racial categories and assigns them to a separate category. Hispanics/Latinos may be of any race.
Race / Ethnicity (NH = Non-Hispanic)	Pop 2000	Pop 2010	Pop 2020	% 2000	% 2010	% 2020
White alone (NH)	2,948	829	357	56.32%	15.27%	7.79%
Black or African American alone (NH)	2,139	4,426	4,032	40.87%	81.53%	87.96%
Native American or Alaska Native alone (NH)	3	5	8	0.06%	0.09%	0.17%
Asian alone (NH)	19	5	2	0.36%	0.09%	0.04%
Native Hawaiian or Pacific Islander alone (NH)	1	0	2	0.02%	0.00%	0.04%
Other race alone (NH)	8	3	5	0.15%	0.06%	0.11%
Mixed race or Multiracial (NH)	58	110	140	1.11%	2.03%	3.05%
Hispanic or Latino (any race)	58	51	38	1.11%	0.94%	0.83%
Total	5,234	5,429	4,584	100.00%	100.00%	100.00%

=== 2020 census ===
As of the 2020 census, Glasgow Village had a population of 4,584 and a median age of 25.9 years.

Of the population, 38.3% were under the age of 18 and 6.2% were age 65 or older. For every 100 females, there were 80.1 males, and for every 100 females age 18 and over, there were 69.1 males.

There were 1,470 households, of which 49.3% had children under the age of 18 living in them. Of all households, 17.7% were married-couple households, 18.4% were households with a male householder and no spouse or partner present, and 54.3% were households with a female householder and no spouse or partner present. About 22.5% of all households were made up of individuals, and 6.6% had someone living alone who was 65 years of age or older.

There were 1,968 housing units, of which 25.3% were vacant. The homeowner vacancy rate was 0.8% and the rental vacancy rate was 20.5%.

In total, 100.0% of residents lived in urban areas and 0.0% lived in rural areas.

=== 2000 census ===
At the 2000 census there were 5,234 people, 1,888 households, and 1,406 families in the CDP. The population density was 5,649.3 inhabitants per square mile (2,181.2/km^{2}). There were 2,009 housing units at an average density of 2,168.4 per square mile (837.2/km^{2}). The racial makeup of the CDP was 56.90% White, 41.06% African American, 0.06% Native American, 0.36% Asian, 0.02% Pacific Islander, 0.31% from other races, and 1.30% from two or more races. Hispanic or Latino of any race were 1.11%.

Of the 1,888 households 41.2% had children under the age of 18 living with them, 43.6% were married couples living together, 26.4% had a female householder with no husband present, and 25.5% were non-families. 22.3% of households were one person and 11.6% were one person aged 65 or older. The average household size was 2.77 and the average family size was 3.23.

The age distribution was 33.7% under the age of 18, 8.2% from 18 to 24, 29.0% from 25 to 44, 14.4% from 45 to 64, and 14.7% 65 or older. The median age was 31 years. For every 100 females, there were 86.0 males. For every 100 females age 18 and over, there were 78.5 males.

The median household income was $36,213 and the median family income was $39,795. Males had a median income of $34,211 versus $27,318 for females. The per capita income for the CDP was $17,667. About 12.6% of families and 13.0% of the population were below the poverty line, including 23.3% of those under age 18 and 2.6% of those age 65 or over.

== Education ==
The majority of the CDP is in the Riverview Gardens School District. Riverview Gardens High School is the district's comprehensive high school.

A portion of the CDP is in the Hazelwood School District.
