= Wilson Larimore House =

Historic site, former plantation

- U.S. National Register of Historic Places
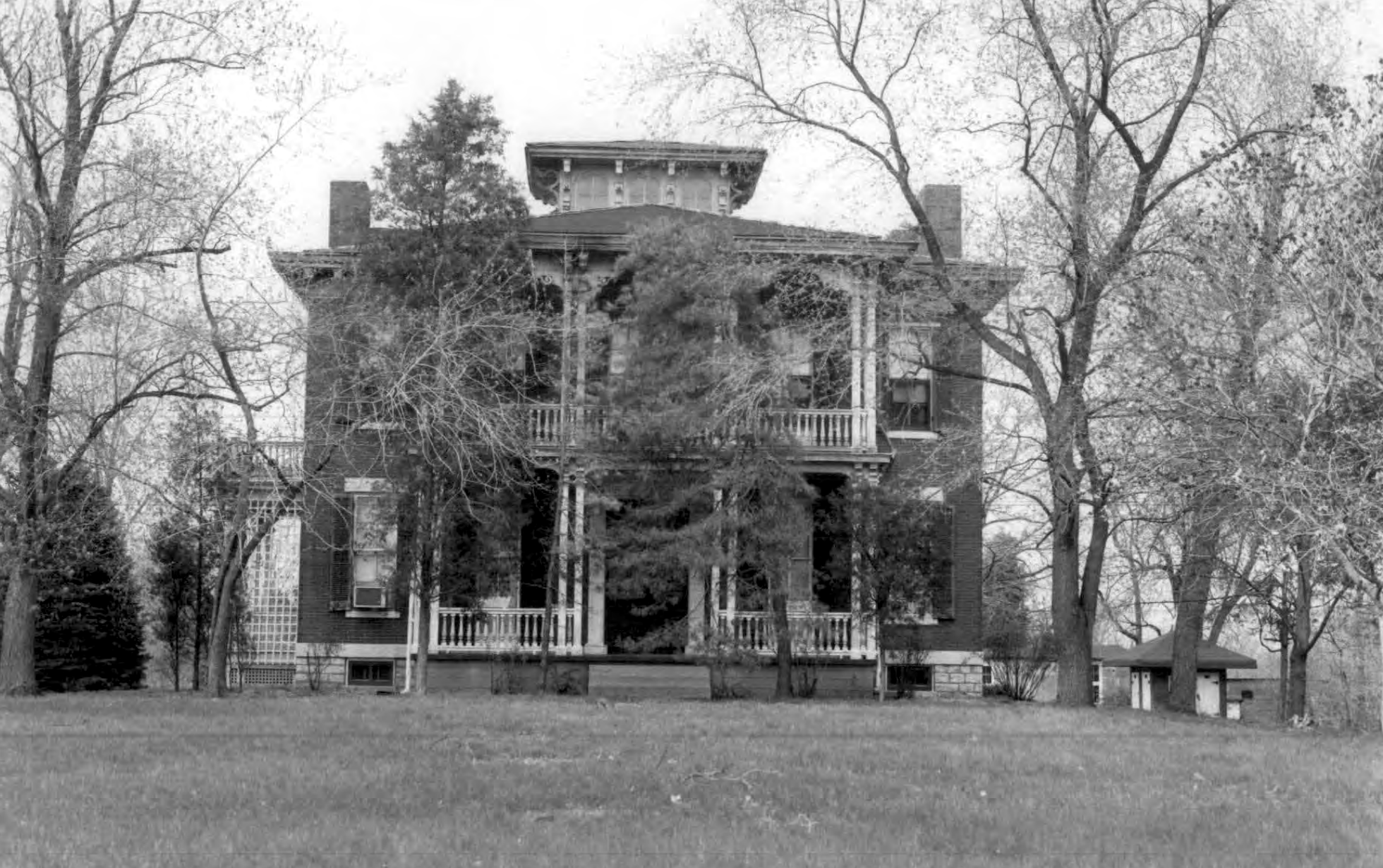
- Location: 11510 Larimore Road, Bellefontaine Neighbors, St. Louis County, Missouri, U.S.
- Coordinates: 38.77482°N 90.20566°W
- Built: 1858
- Architect: Wilson L. Larimore
- Architectural style: Italianate
- NRHP reference No.: 88003244
- Added to NRHP: February 10, 1989

The Wilson Larimore House is a historic plantation house built in 1858, located at 11510 Larimore Road in Bellefontaine Neighbors, St. Louis County, Missouri. Formerly this was a working plantation with enslaved labor. It has been listed as one of the National Register of Historic Places since February 10, 1989, for architectural significance and agricultural history. The home is privately owned and has operated as a wedding venue. It also goes by the name the Larimore House Plantation, or simply the Larimore House.

== History and agriculture ==
The Wilson Larimore House was built in 1858 by Wilson L. Larimore (1810–1887) an emigrant of Paris, Bourbon County, Kentucky, and originally stood on roughly 1,000 acres of land. The Larimore family was descents of the Huguenots, and his wife Harriet Berry's family was descents of the English colonists on the Mayflower. Wilson L. Larimore had worked as a planter, and he had invented a new design of scythe cradle for cutting hemp.

Larimore purchased the land in the 1840s for about $10–$12 per acre, the land was forested meadowland at the confluence of the Mississippi River and Missouri River. By 1850, the Larimore's had owned 14 enslaved people. The early years of the farm they planted a diversity of crops including corn, meadow hay, rye, sweet potatoes, beeswax, honey, and grass seed; and farmed sheep for wool and pigs for meat. By 1860, the Larimore's had owned 16 enslaved people, and saw a marked growth in farm profits with a focus on only growing hay.

The first agricultural fair in St. Louis County, Missouri, was held in 1824 and these events maintained popularity through the antebellum-era, but were paused during the United States Civil War. In 1866, a year after the end of the war, Larimore was awarded a prize for the, "best improved and most highly cultivated farm, no less than 500 acres" at one of these agricultural fairs. In other publications it was referred to as a "model farm".

The land and house was inherited by his son Newell Green Larimore (1835–1913) and was part of the Larimore family for more than 50 years, and it later became the property of John Scott and the Penningroth family.

== Architecture ==
The property contains the main house, a shed, a barn, and a brick outhouse. The main house was built in an early Italianate architecture style and has two stories. It was an example of the transition from traditional architecture of mid-19th-century building, to the newer Italianate style that emerged in the area and as of 1988, it had maintained many of its original architectural details and interior elements.

== See also ==
- List of plantations in the United States
- National Register of Historic Places listings in St. Louis County, Missouri
- Slavery in the United States
