= River Roads Mall =

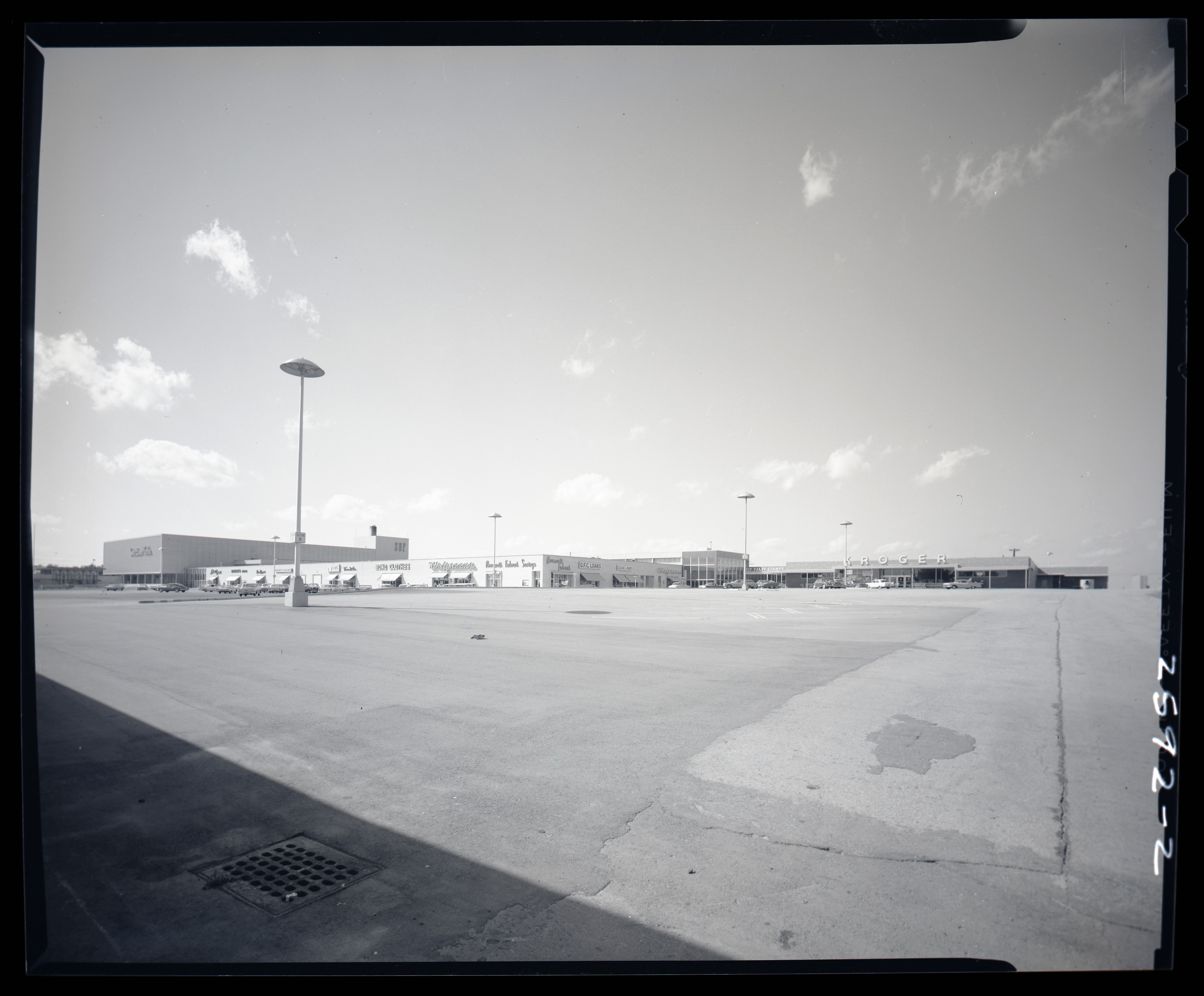
- River Roads Mall in October 1962
- Location: Jennings, Missouri, United States
- Coordinates: 38.72844°N 90.24557°W
- Address: 8944 Jennings Station Road
- Opened: 1962
- Closed: 1995
- Demolished: August 2006–September 2007
- Developer: Stix, Baer & Fuller
- Num. of anchor tenants: 3
- Floor area: 835,000 square feet (77,574.0 m^{2})
- Floors: 2

River Roads Mall, also known as River Roads Shopping Center, was an enclosed shopping mall located in the city of Jennings, a suburb of St. Louis, Missouri, United States. Opened in 1962 as one of the nation's first shopping malls, it featured J. C. Penney, F. W. Woolworth Company, Kroger, and Stix, Baer & Fuller as its anchor stores. The mall was expanded in 1972 with a new location of J. C. Penney, but began losing major stores in the early 1980s. J. C. Penney closed in 1983, but was soon reopened as an outlet store, while Stix, Baer & Fuller was sold to Dillard's in 1984 and closed only two years later. Tenancy continued to decline throughout the 1990s, culminating in the closure of the J. C. Penney outlet and mall proper in 1995, although the abandoned structure was not demolished until 2006.

== History ==
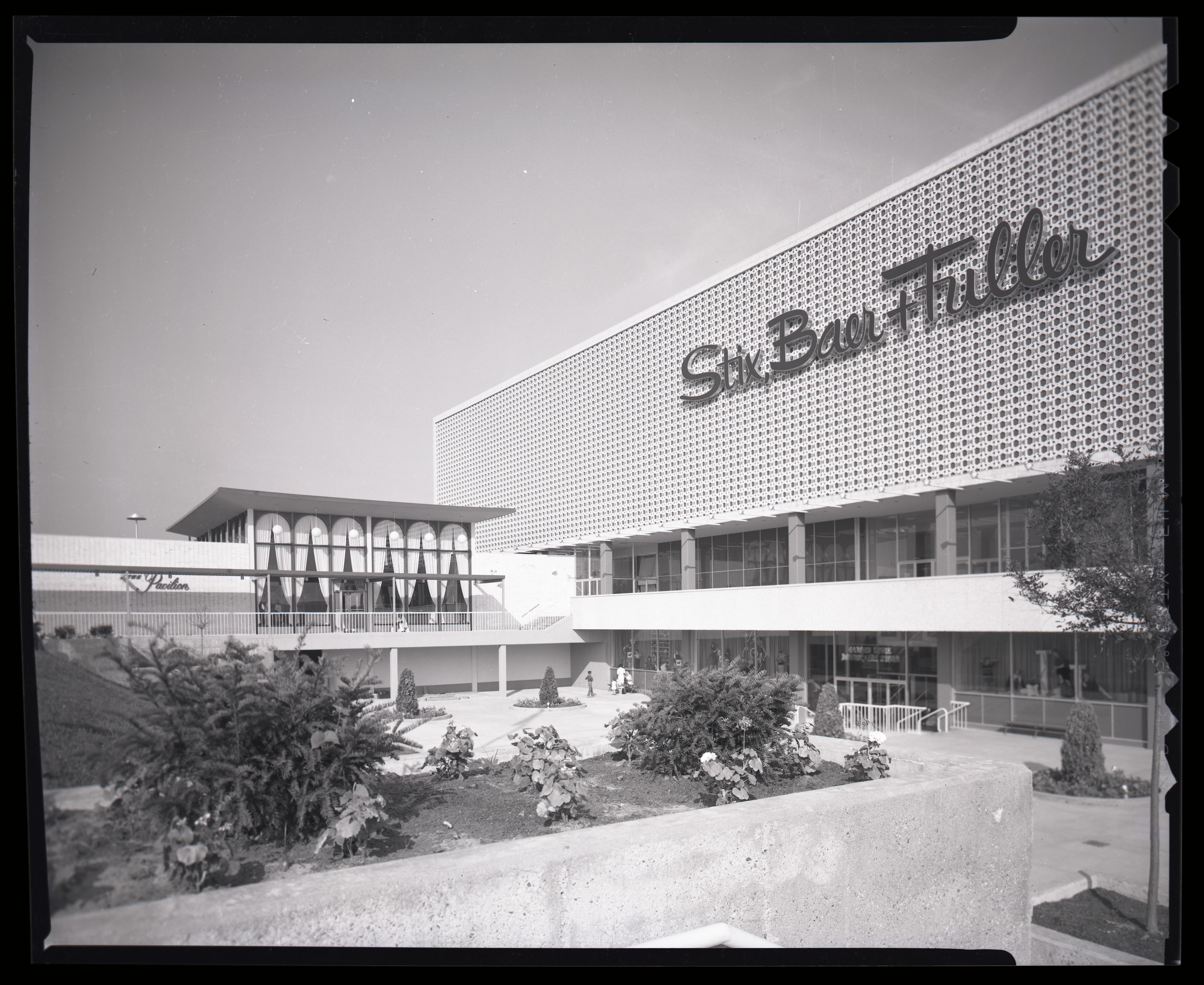
Stix, Baer & Fuller at the mall, August 1961

Opened in 1962, the mall originally featured J. C. Penney and St. Louis-based Stix, Baer & Fuller as its main anchor stores, as well as a Kroger supermarket and a Woolworth dime store. Other major tenants included Walgreens, Lane Bryant, Thom McAn, Bakers Shoes, Bond Clothing Stores, and a branch of local jewelry store Hess and Culbertson.

In 1972, J. C. Penney replaced its location at the mall with a newer store built behind the existing one, which was converted to a new row of mall shops. This new store was their largest location in Missouri at the time of its construction. Once this expansion was completed, the mall was increased from 620,000 square feet (58,000 m^{2}) to 835,000 square feet (77,600 m^{2}) of mall space and a total of 60 stores. Among the new stores were several local boutiques, a fabric store, Foxmoor Casuals, and Waldenbooks. The mall's parking lot was also expanded and re-landscaped, while many mall tenants such as Stix, Baer & Fuller, Woolworth, Kroger, and Lane Bryant underwent storewide renovations as well.

The mall underwent a series of store closings in the 1980s, including most of the anchor tenants. J. C. Penney closed in mid-1983 due to declining sales. This was one of two large retail closings in Jennings that year, the other being a Kmart across the street from the mall. At the time of the closing announcement, the mall's then-owners had proposed reducing the size of the store in order to sustain profitability, but the company had decided to follow through with closing the location due to the presence of other J. C. Penney stores in nearby areas. Despite this decision, J. C. Penney reopened a part of the store in 1984 as an outlet store, featuring overstocked merchandise from other locations.

Dillard's bought the Stix, Baer & Fuller chain in 1984, converting all Stix, Baer & Fuller stores to the Dillard's name. Originally, the mall's Stix, Baer & Fuller store was not considered for conversion to Dillard's due to declining sales, but then-company chairman William Dillard decided to allow the store to operate under the Dillard's name until its original lease expired, to determine if the name change would increase profitability. While the store's profits did increase as Dillard's, the increases were not considered sufficient by the chain, so the store was closed in late 1986. Also by 1986, the former Kroger in the mall, vacated in 1983, had been replaced by another supermarket called Food for Less. By 1992, Woolworth had closed as well, leaving the J. C. Penney outlet as the sole anchor store. Then-owners Benderson Corp. had proposed converting River Roads to an outlet mall, but these plans were canceled due to concerns over the nation's economy and a surplus of retail space in the St. Louis market at the time. Despite this, Benderson announced in 1992 that other retailers had taken interest in the locations vacated by Woolworth and Dillard's. J. C. Penney closed the outlet store in 1994. Following this closure, the interior mall was abandoned in 1995, except for Food for Less and some tenants that had exterior entrances. The mall building fell into a state of disrepair, including overgrown greenery and built-up trash, so a local group of churches known as Churches United for Community Action worked with the city of Jennings to clean up the property.

Benderson had sold the mall property in 1997. River Roads served as a MetroBus transfer point until 2006. Demolition of the vacant structure began in 2006.

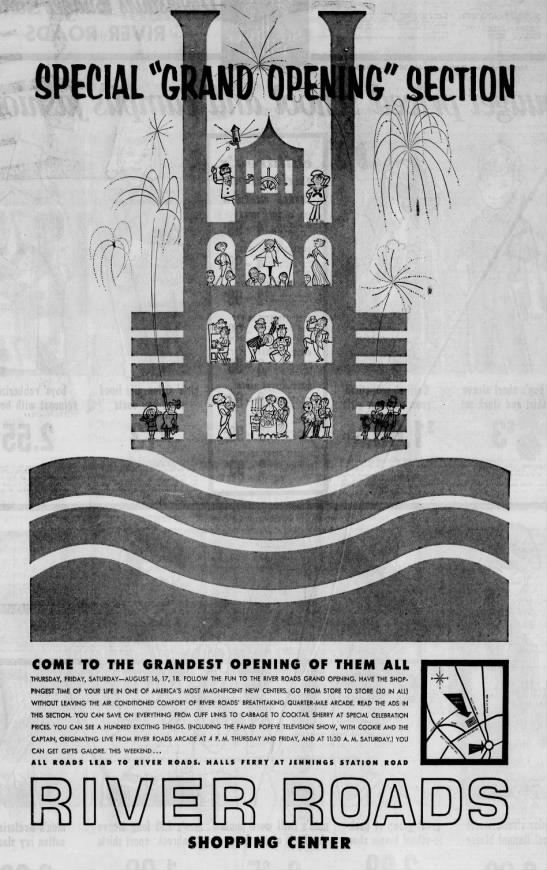
River Roads Mall ad - Jennings, Missouri, 1962
