= Black Jack, Missouri =

City in St. Louis County, Missouri, United States

- City
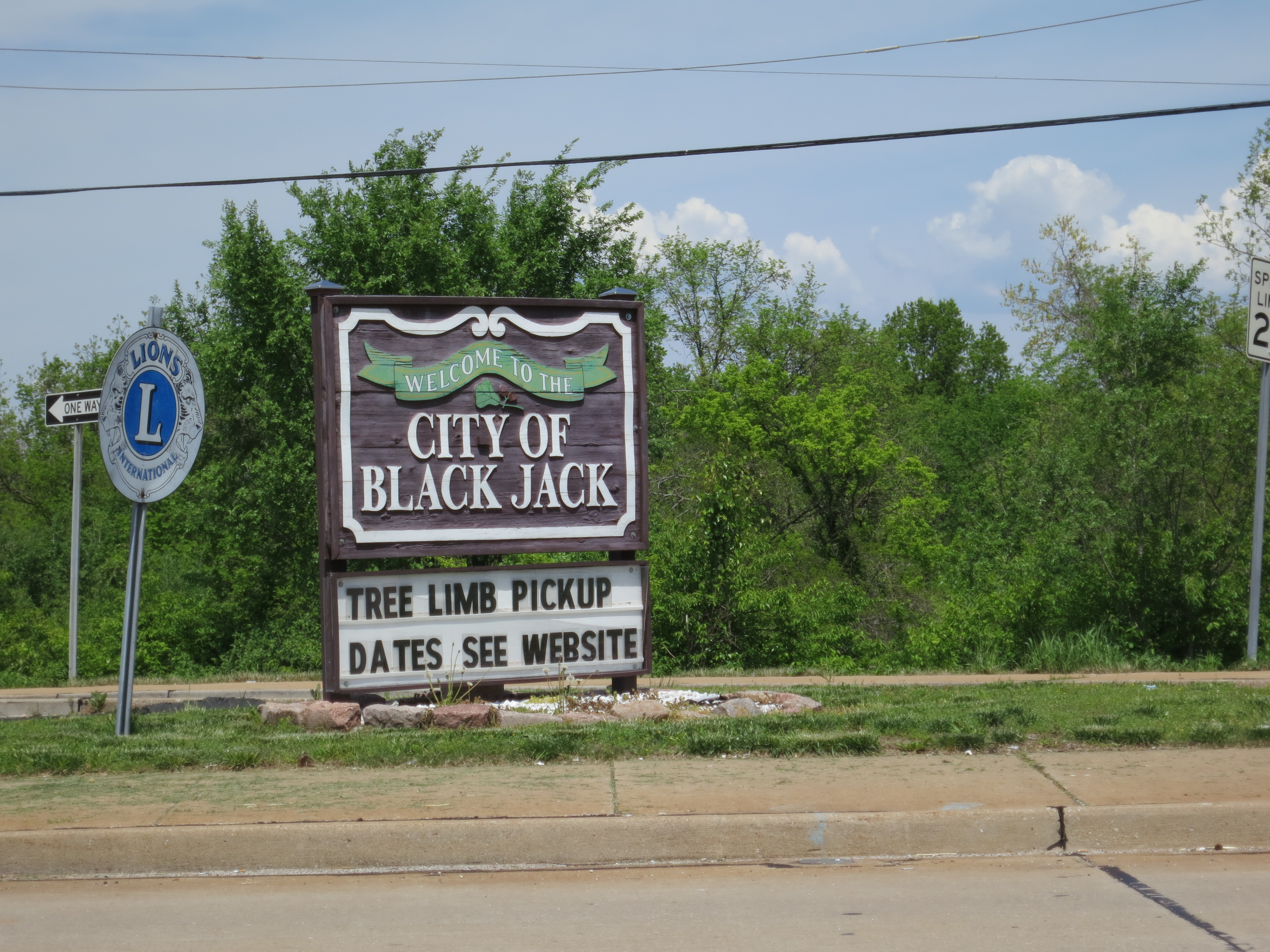

- Logo

- Location of Black Jack, Missouri
- Coordinates: 38°47′57″N 90°15′51″W
- Country: United States
- State: Missouri
- County: St. Louis
- Townships: Spanish Lake, Ferguson

Government
  - Mayor: Arnold Hinkle

Area
  - Total: 2.61 sq mi (6.75 km^{2})
  - Land: 2.59 sq mi (6.70 km^{2})
  - Water: 0.019 sq mi (0.05 km^{2})
- Elevation: 574 ft (175 m)

Population (2020)
  - Total: 6,634
  - Density: 2,565.1/sq mi (990.39/km^{2})
- Time zone: UTC-6 (Central (CST))
  - Summer (DST): UTC-5 (CDT)
- ZIP code: 63033
- Area code: 314
- FIPS code: 29-06004
- GNIS feature ID: 2394179
- Website: cityofblackjack.com

Black Jack is a second-ring suburb of St. Louis in northern St. Louis County, Missouri, United States. The population was 6,634 at the 2020 census.

A post office called Black Jack was established in 1872, and operated until 1906. The community was named for a grove of blackjack oak trees near the original town site.

On August 6th, 1970, Black jack became a Third Class City, after filing a petition with the St Louis County Clerk.

== Geography ==
According to the United States Census Bureau, the city has a total area of 2.60 square miles (6.73 km^{2}), of which 2.59 square miles (6.71 km^{2}) is land and 0.01 square miles (0.03 km^{2}) is water.

== Demographics ==
=== Racial and ethnic composition ===
Black Jack, Missouri – Racial and ethnic composition Note: the US Census treats Hispanic/Latino as an ethnic category. This table excludes Latinos from the racial categories and assigns them to a separate category. Hispanics/Latinos may be of any race.
Race / Ethnicity (NH = Non-Hispanic)	Pop 2000	Pop 2010	Pop 2020	% 2000	% 2010	% 2020
White alone (NH)	1,774	1,120	631	26.12%	16.16%	9.51%
Black or African American alone (NH)	4,833	5,596	5,609	71.16%	80.76%	84.55%
Native American or Alaska Native alone (NH)	9	5	18	0.13%	0.07%	0.27%
Asian alone (NH)	24	25	35	0.35%	0.36%	0.53%
Native Hawaiian or Pacific Islander alone (NH)	1	0	4	0.01%	0.00%	0.06%
Other race alone (NH)	16	10	40	0.24%	0.14%	0.60%
Mixed race or Multiracial (NH)	90	122	216	1.33%	1.76%	3.26%
Hispanic or Latino (any race)	45	51	81	0.66%	0.74%	1.22%
Total	6,792	6,929	6,634	100.00%	100.00%	100.00%

Historical population
Census	Pop.	Note	%±
1970	4,145		—
1980	5,293		27.7%
1990	6,131		15.8%
2000	6,792		10.8%
2010	6,929		2.0%
2020	6,634		−4.3%
City of Black Jack

=== 2020 census ===
As of the 2020 census, Black Jack had a population of 6,634. The median age was 42.7 years. 22.4% of residents were under the age of 18 and 22.3% of residents were 65 years of age or older. For every 100 females there were 80.6 males, and for every 100 females age 18 and over there were 74.8 males age 18 and over.

100.0% of residents lived in urban areas, while 0.0% lived in rural areas.

There were 2,504 households in Black Jack, of which 30.9% had children under the age of 18 living in them. Of all households, 36.4% were married-couple households, 18.0% were households with a male householder and no spouse or partner present, and 40.3% were households with a female householder and no spouse or partner present. About 29.9% of all households were made up of individuals and 11.8% had someone living alone who was 65 years of age or older.

There were 2,747 housing units, of which 8.8% were vacant. The homeowner vacancy rate was 2.4% and the rental vacancy rate was 9.7%.

=== 2010 census ===
As of the census of 2010, there were 6,929 people, 2,591 households, and 1,797 families living in the city. The population density was 2,675.3 inhabitants per square mile (1,032.9/km^{2}). There were 2,809 housing units at an average density of 1,084.6 per square mile (418.8/km^{2}). The racial makeup of the city was 81.2% African American, 16.3% White, 0.1% Native American, 0.4% Asian, 0.2% from other races, and 1.8% from two or more races. Hispanic or Latino of any race were 0.7% of the population.

There were 2,591 households, of which 35.5% had children under the age of 18 living with them, 42.6% were married couples living together, 21.4% had a female householder with no husband present, 5.3% had a male householder with no wife present, and 30.6% were non-families. 27.2% of all households were made up of individuals, and 10.6% had someone living alone who was 65 years of age or older. The average household size was 2.58 and the average family size was 3.13.

The median age in the city was 40.9 years. 23.4% of residents were under the age of 18; 9.5% were between the ages of 18 and 24; 22% were from 25 to 44; 29.1% were from 45 to 64; and 16.1% were 65 years of age or older. The gender makeup of the city was 44.9% male and 55.1% female.

=== 2000 census ===
As of the census of 2000, there were 6,792 people, 2,422 households, and 1,789 families living in the city. The population density was 2,553.3 inhabitants per square mile (985.8/km^{2}). There were 2,587 housing units at an average density of 972.5 per square mile (375.5/km^{2}). The racial makeup of the city was 26.31% White, 71.32% African American, 0.13% Native American, 0.35% Asian, 0.01% Pacific Islander, 0.35% from other races, and 1.52% from two or more races. Hispanic or Latino of any race were 0.66% of the population.

There were 2,422 households, out of which 36.6% had children under the age of 18 living with them, 52.1% were married couples living together, 18.3% had a female householder with no husband present, and 26.1% were non-families. 23.2% of all households were made up of individuals, and 8.2% had someone living alone who was 65 years of age or older. The average household size was 2.70 and the average family size was 3.20.

In the city, the population was spread out, with 27.3% under the age of 18, 8.0% from 18 to 24, 27.1% from 25 to 44, 24.3% from 45 to 64, and 13.2% who were 65 years of age or older. The median age was 37 years. For every 100 females, there were 79.6 males. For every 100 females age 18 and over, there were 75.0 males.

The median income for a household in the city was $51,806, and the median income for a family was $63,324. Males had a median income of $41,969 versus $30,930 for females. The per capita income for the city was $22,705. About 2.8% of families and 4.7% of the population were below the poverty line, including 5.2% of those under age 18 and 6.9% of those age 65 or over.

== Education ==
Black Jack is in the Hazelwood School District.

== Family controversy ==
In May 2006, the Black Jack city government made a controversial decision to remove an unmarried couple and their children from their own home on the grounds that the couple was not related enough to each other to satisfy a municipal ordinance. For the purpose of obtaining an occupancy permit, Black Jack defined a family as:

- An individual; or
- Two or more persons related by blood, marriage or adoption; or
- A group of not more than three persons who need not be related by blood, marriage or adoption.

Therefore, an unmarried couple with one child would qualify as a family, whereas an unmarried couple with multiple children would not.

On August 10, 2006, the ACLU of Eastern Missouri filed a lawsuit against the city, claiming violation of due process and equal protection, and violation of housing laws. On August 15 the Black Jack city council unanimously passed a resolution changing the definition of family to include an unmarried couple and their children.

== See also ==
- List of cities in Missouri
