= Wehrenberg Theatres =

American movie chain (acquired in 2016)

- 100th anniversary logo (2006)
- Type: Subsidiary
- Industry: Entertainment
- Founded: 1906; 120 years ago
- Founder: Fred Wehrenberg
- Defunct: December 2016
- Fate: Acquired by Marcus Theatres
- Parent: Marcus Theatres (from 2016)

Fred Wehrenberg Circuit of Theatres, Inc., doing business as Wehrenberg Theatres, was an American movie theater chain. It operated 15 movie theaters with 213 screens in the states of Missouri, Illinois, Iowa, Arizona and Minnesota, including nine theaters with 131 screens in the St. Louis metropolitan area. It was a member of the National Association of Theatre Owners (now Cinema United). On November 21, 2016, it was announced that the Wehrenberg Theater chain would be acquired by Marcus Theatres. The acquisition was completed in December 2016.

== History ==
In 1906, Fred Wehrenberg, a former blacksmith who ran a saloon, rented the bakery next to his saloon and opened the Cherokee Theatre. While silent movies were shown, Wehrenberg's nephew drummed in the background while his wife, Gertrude, played piano in the pit.

The saloon doubled as the theater's de facto concession stand, and many customers frequented both buildings. The Wehrenbergs eventually opened a second venue, the Airdome, in St. Louis in 1924.

The Airdome was St. Louis’ first open-air venue. A screen was erected at one end of a fenced-in lot while an elevated projection booth was built across from it. Guests sat on folding chairs and benches placed on the bare ground. In the winter, a canvas tarp trapped the heat from potbellied stoves.

The Wehrenbergs survived the Great Depression as the movie industry was more stable than most. Wehrenberg succeeded with help from his family, and by being a showman. He launched numerous promotions, including giveaways of china, glassware, flatware, turkeys and hams. These innovations ensured circuit success even during periods of economic hardship in the city.

As their business grew, the Wehrenbergs expanded their theater circuit. They sold their saloon in order to focus on the movie business. They built St. Louis’ Best Theatre, the first building in the city constructed expressly for use as a motion-picture theater.

Then, in July 1948, Fred and his son-in-law, Paul Krueger, opened the first Wehrenberg Drive-In. The Drive-In was named "Ronnie's" after six-year-old Ronald Paul Krueger, Paul's son and Fred's grandson. Ronnie's was the beginning of Ron's lifelong association with the circuit. While still a boy, he ran the miniature train around the playground at Ronnie's Drive-In, entertaining the small children in attendance. Fred debuted another family-friendly idea with pony rides at the 66 Park-In, which Wehrenberg had purchased from Flexer Theatres in April 1948. Ron led the pony rides. Ron eventually worked as a carhop, usher and concessionaire before becoming president of the company.

During the 1950s, the industry encountered its first predicament. Television and a post-war migration to the suburbs closed several indoor theatres. The Wehrenberg circuit was able to ride the popularity of the drive-ins. Paul Krueger, who had taken over management of the circuit upon Fred Wehrenberg's death in 1949, died in 1963. Twenty-three-year-old Ron Krueger assumed the circuit's presidency and continued with his father's plans.

The 1960s and 1970s saw another surge in the industry. Multiplexes, theaters with two to six screens, became the popular choice of movie-goers. Wehrenberg's Cinema Four Center in St. Charles was the first multiplex in the St. Louis area.

In the late 1980s and into the 1990s, the circuit started building megaplexes of ten or more screens. Wehrenberg also expanded outside the St. Louis area. New theaters opened their doors to guests in Springfield, Osage Beach and Cape Girardeau, MO.

The fourth generation in the family business, Ronald Krueger II, worked for the family business for over 20 years, starting as a theater usher and projectionist and then advancing through multiple positions in accounting and operations. He became president of the theatre operating company in 2001 and worked with the team to help expand the circuit and its innovations. He left the company in 2008 and became President and COO of New Orleans–based VSS-Southern Theatres.

In 2004, Wehrenberg again grew in size and vision with two new theaters. The first, named the Galaxy 16, introduced Iowa to the circuit with its Cedar Rapids location. The second, named the Galaxy 14, is in Chesterfield, Missouri, and boasts St. Louis’ largest screen, the Mega Screen.

Both "Galaxy" locations also are home to "Freds Drive-In," a food court designed like 1950s diners, that serves pizza, chicken fingers and toasted ravioli. They also feature "Now Playing" Family Entertainment Centers and separate party rooms.

In 2015, Wehrenberg Theatres was awarded the Director's Community Leadership Award (DCLA) by the Federal Bureau of Investigation.

Wehrenberg Theatres was family-owned and operated. Ron Krueger's death on October 21, 2015, left Bill Menke as President and Midge Krueger as CEO.

On November 21, 2016, it was announced that the Wehrenberg Theater chain would be acquired by Marcus Theatres. The acquisition was completed in December 2016.

== Former Theaters ==
=== Missouri ===
- Cape West 14 – Cape Girardeau
- Eagles' Landing 8 – Lake Ozark
- Campbell 16 – Springfield, Missouri
- Battlefield Mall 6 – Springfield, Missouri

==== Greater St. Louis area ====
- Arnold 14 – Arnold
- Mid Rivers 14 – St. Peters
- Chesterfield Galaxy 14 – Chesterfield (Mega Screen3D)
- Clarkson 6- Chesterfield
- O'Fallon 15 – O'Fallon, Illinois
- Halls Ferry 8, then 14 – Florissant, Missouri
- Des Peres 14 – Des Peres
- Ronnies 20 – Sappington (IMAX & IMAX 3D)
- St. Charles Stadium 18 – St. Charles
- St. Clair 10 – Fairview Heights
- Town Square 12 – Dardenne Prairie
- Shady Oak 1 – Clayton, Missouri
- Crown Theatre 1 – Ferguson, Missouri

=== Illinois ===
- Bloomington Galaxy 14 – Bloomington (IMAX & IMAX 3D)

=== Iowa ===
- Cedar Rapids Galaxy 16 – Cedar Rapids

=== Minnesota ===
- Rochester Galaxy 14 – Rochester (IMAX & IMAX 3D)
