= Jennings, Missouri =

City in Missouri, US

- City
- City of Jennings
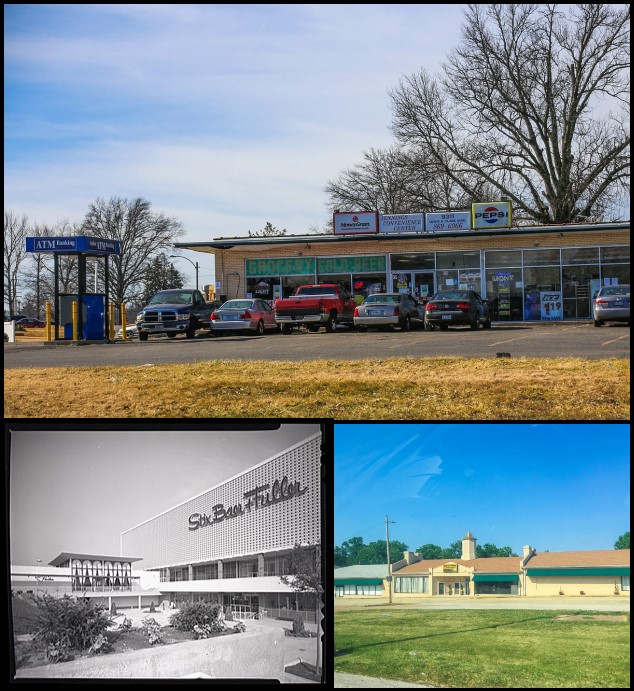
- Top: Business in Jennings; bottom left: River Roads Mall (demolished); bottom right: Church in Jennings

- Flag

- Location of Jennings, Missouri
- Coordinates: 38°43′23″N 90°15′52″W
- Country: United States
- State: Missouri
- County: St. Louis

Area
  - Total: 3.73 sq mi (9.67 km^{2})
  - Land: 3.73 sq mi (9.67 km^{2})
  - Water: 0 sq mi (0.00 km^{2})
- Elevation: 522 ft (159 m)

Population (2020)
  - Total: 12,895
  - Density: 3,454.2/sq mi (1,333.67/km^{2})
- Time zone: UTC-6 (Central (CST))
  - Summer (DST): UTC-5 (CDT)
- ZIP code: 63136
- Area code: 314
- FIPS code: 29-37178
- GNIS feature ID: 2395465
- Website: Official website

Jennings is a city in St. Louis County, Missouri, United States. Per the 2020 census, the population was 12,895.

== History ==
The city was named after James Jennings, a farmer and merchant who moved to the area from Virginia with his family and retinue of slaves in 1839. In 1855, a railway was constructed which bisected the original Jennings property. Apparently the first commercial concern originating in the area was the Seed Dry Plate Company in 1883, which left for Rochester, New York around 1911 after its purchase by Eastman Kodak. The city benefited from the economic boom following World War II and was incorporated (with state and county administrations) in 1946.

== Geography ==
According to the United States Census Bureau, the city has a total area of 3.70 square miles (9.58 km^{2}), all land.

== Demographics ==
=== Racial and ethnic composition ===
Jennings city, Missouri – Racial and ethnic composition Note: the US Census treats Hispanic/Latino as an ethnic category. This table excludes Latinos from the racial categories and assigns them to a separate category. Hispanics/Latinos may be of any race.
Race / Ethnicity (NH = Non-Hispanic)	Pop 2000	Pop 2010	Pop 2020	% 2000	% 2010	% 2020
White alone (NH)	2,955	1,237	675	19.10%	8.41%	5.23%
Black or African American alone (NH)	12,099	13,173	11,695	78.21%	89.54%	90.69%
Native American or Alaska Native alone (NH)	16	21	20	0.10%	0.14%	0.16%
Asian alone (NH)	59	24	29	0.38%	0.16%	0.22%
Native Hawaiian or Pacific Islander alone (NH)	4	0	1	0.03%	0.00%	0.01%
Other race alone (NH)	17	19	38	0.11%	0.13%	0.29%
Mixed race or Multiracial (NH)	206	148	316	1.33%	1.01%	2.45%
Hispanic or Latino (any race)	113	90	121	0.73%	0.61%	0.94%
Total	15,469	14,712	12,895	100.00%	100.00%	100.00%

Historical population
Census	Pop.	Note	%±
1950	15,282		—
1960	19,965		30.6%
1970	19,379		−2.9%
1980	16,934		−12.6%
1990	15,905		−6.1%
2000	15,469		−2.7%
2010	14,712		−4.9%
2020	12,895		−12.4%
U.S. Decennial Census; 2010 2020

=== 2020 census ===
As of the 2020 census, Jennings had a population of 12,895. The median age was 40.1 years. 24.7% of residents were under the age of 18 and 17.9% were 65 years of age or older. For every 100 females, there were 80.6 males, and for every 100 females age 18 and over, there were 74.4 males.

100.0% of residents lived in urban areas, while 0.0% lived in rural areas.

There were 5,540 households in Jennings, of which 28.9% had children under the age of 18 living in them. Of all households, 17.7% were married-couple households, 22.8% were households with a male householder and no spouse or partner present, and 53.0% were households with a female householder and no spouse or partner present. About 38.1% of all households were made up of individuals, and 17.5% had someone living alone who was 65 years of age or older. There were 3,514 families, and the average household and family sizes were 2.3 and 3.1, respectively.

There were 6,781 housing units, of which 18.3% were vacant. The homeowner vacancy rate was 2.3% and the rental vacancy rate was 13.9%.

=== Income and poverty ===
The 2016–2020 5-year American Community Survey estimates show that the median household income was $31,952 (with a margin of error of +/- $4,609) and the median family income was $39,699 (+/- $10,265). Males had a median income of $24,518 (+/- $3,962) versus $30,212 (+/- $2,621) for females. The median income for those above 16 years old was $27,411 (+/- $3,369). Approximately, 23.1% of families and 25.0% of the population were below the poverty line, including 27.3% of those under the age of 18 and 38.7% of those ages 65 or over.

=== 2010 census ===
At the 2010 census there were 14,712 people, 5,847 households and 3,782 families living in the city. The population density was 3,976.2 per square mile (1,535.2/km^{2}). There were 6,937 housing units at an average density of 1,874.9 per square mile (723.9/km^{2}). The racial makeup of the city was 89.8% African American, 8.5% White, 0.1% Native American, 0.2% Asian, 0.2% from other races, and 1.1% from two or more races. Hispanic or Latino of any race were 0.6%.

Of the 5,847 households, 36.4% had children under the age of 18 living with them, 22.4% were married couples living together, 36.0% had a female householder with no husband present, 6.3% had a male householder with no wife present, and 35.3% were non-families. 31.2% of households were one person and 10.4% were one person aged 65 or older. The average household size was 2.51 and the average family size was 3.13.

The median age was 35.2 years. 27% of residents were under the age of 18; 10.3% were between the ages of 18 and 24; 24.3% were from 25 to 44; 27.7% were from 45 to 64; and 10.7% were 65 or older. The gender makeup of the city was 44.5% male and 55.5% female.

=== 2000 census ===
At the 2000 census there were 15,469 people, 6,174 households and 4,081 families living in the city. The population density was 4,193.3 per square mile (1,619.0/km^{2}). There were 6,798 housing units at an average density of 1,842.8 per square mile (711.5/km^{2}). The racial make-up was 19.32% White, 78.58% African American, 0.10% Native American, 0.38% Asian, 0.03% Pacific Islander, 0.19% from other races, and 1.40% from two or more races. Hispanic or Latino of any race were 0.73%.

Of the 6,174 households, 35.3% had children under the age of 18 living with them, 29.2% were married couples living together, 31.5% had a female householder with no husband present, and 33.9% were non-families. 30.4% of households were one person and 11.6% were one person aged 65 or older. The average household size was 2.50 and the average family size was 3.12.

The age distribution was 30.4% under the age of 18, 9.0% from 18 to 24, 29.2% from 25 to 44, 20.3% from 45 to 64, and 11.1% 65 or older. The median age was 33 years. For every 100 females, there were 79.5 males. For every 100 females age 18 and over, there were 72.2 males.

The median household income was $29,196 and the median family income was $33,761. Males had a median income of $28,697 and females $25,013. The per capita income was $15,820. About 16.0% of families and 19.0% of the population were below the poverty line, including 28.3% of those under age 18 and 14.6% of those age 65 or over.

== Public safety ==
The City of Jennings contracts with the St. Louis County Police Department to provide professional police services to the city.

The City of Jennings Police Department was disbanded by the city in 2011 due to corruption within the department, including cases of missing money.

Jennings Fire Department merged with Riverview Fire Protection District in 2014. In 2019, Riverview Fire Protection District was renamed North County Fire & Rescue to account for all the communities it serves.

Emergency Medical Services are provided by Christian Hospital EMS.

== Education ==
Most of Jennings is in Jennings School District. Pieces of it are in Riverview Gardens School District, Ferguson-Florissant R-II School District and Normandy Schools Collaborative.

== See also ==
- List of cities in Missouri
