= Spanish Lake, Missouri =

- Unincorporated community Census-designated place
- Location of Spanish Lake, Missouri
- Coordinates: 38°47′18″N 90°12′28″W
- Country: United States
- State: Missouri
- County: St. Louis
- Townships: Spanish Lake, St. Ferdinand

Area
  - Total: 7.49 sq mi (19.39 km^{2})
  - Land: 7.37 sq mi (19.09 km^{2})
  - Water: 0.11 sq mi (0.29 km^{2})
- Elevation: 512 ft (156 m)

Population (2020)
  - Total: 18,413
  - Density: 2,497.6/sq mi (964.34/km^{2})
- Time zone: UTC-6 (Central (CST))
  - Summer (DST): UTC-5 (CDT)
- ZIP code: 63138
- Area code(s): 314/557
- FIPS code: 29-69266
- GNIS feature ID: 2393243

Spanish Lake is an unincorporated community and census-designated place (CDP) in Spanish Lake and St. Ferdinand townships, St. Louis County, Missouri, United States. The population was 18,413 at the 2020 census.

== Geography ==
The Spanish Lake community is located in the northeastern portion of St. Louis County. The community is bounded by the Mississippi River to the east, the Missouri River to the north, Highway 367 to the west, and Interstate 270 to the south.

According to the United States Census Bureau, the CDP has a total area of 7.5 square miles (19 km^{2}), of which 7.4 square miles (19 km^{2}) is land and 0.2 square miles (0.52 km^{2}), or 2.13%, is water.

== History ==
Spanish Lake, originally called Spanish Pond until the late nineteenth century, was named after the Spanish troops who stayed there while building a fortified post for Spain in 1768. Much of the area was once the property of James De St. Vrain, a brother of the last Spanish lieutenant governor of Upper Louisiana. It was in this district, near Spanish Pond, that an old log cabin, said to have been used as a government building by Lieutenant Governor De Lassus De St. Vrain, the last Spanish executive to rule this section, was erected.

Spanish Lake prospered in the nineteenth century, as a crossroads farming village came into being. The Bellefontaine Road area was settled largely after General Bissell relocated Fort Bellefontaine. Fort Bellefontaine was established in 1806 by Gen. James Wilkerson, governor of the territory of Louisiana. The fort served as one of the most important military posts west of the Mississippi River until the troops were removed to the Jefferson Barracks reservation in 1827. Traffic between St. Louis and the fort was busy; many officials had homes in both places, and visiting dignitaries usually went to both sites. The liveliest traffic was effected by the farmers riding back and forth to the city.

Spanish Lake became a well-developed neighborhood with the arrival of German immigrants. Farmland was intensely cultivated, and small businesses and industries sprang up around the intersection of Bellefontaine, Parker, and Spanish Pond roads, forming the village's center. The Catholic parish of St. Aloysius in Spanish Lake was founded by, and for many years served as, a mission of Baden, located in the northern portion of St. Louis. The Bank of Baden played a large role in farm financing in Spanish Lake, and many county farmers also had business interests in Baden. The German dominance of the region was almost complete by the 1870s, and most of the surviving farm houses and outbuildings are associated with that era.

Spanish Lake was a rural farming community for many years, until the 1950s when neighborhoods of tract housing were built. The area became a rural refuge from St. Louis city and received an exclusively white population. The 1970s saw the proliferation of dense apartment housing to Spanish Lake. African-Americans fleeing the failed Pruitt-Igoe public housing high rises in the city moved into the apartments via the Section 8 voucher system which immediately struck racial tensions in the area, particularly in local schools. The 1990s saw a mass exodus of the white population, spurred on by blockbusting, a practice some U.S. real estate agents use to encourage white property owners to sell their houses quickly at a loss, implying the African-Americans moving into their neighborhood will depress their property values. This era of the city's history is chronicled in the documentary Spanish Lake, although its depiction comes with some disagreement from community stakeholders.

== Demographics ==
Historical population
Census	Pop.	Note	%±
1970	15,647		—
1980	20,632		31.9%
1990	20,322		−1.5%
2000	21,337		5.0%
2010	19,650		−7.9%
2020	18,413		−6.3%
U.S. Decennial Census; 2010 2020

=== Racial and ethnic composition ===
Spanish Lake CDP, Missouri – Racial and ethnic composition Note: the US Census treats Hispanic/Latino as an ethnic category. This table excludes Latinos from the racial categories and assigns them to a separate category. Hispanics/Latinos may be of any race.
Race / Ethnicity (NH = Non-Hispanic)	Pop 1990	Pop 2000	Pop 2010	Pop 2020	% 1990	% 2000	% 2010	% 2020	
White alone (NH)	16,377	8,934	3,808	2,107	80.59%	41.87%	19.38%	11.44%	
Black or African American alone (NH)	3,537	11,638	15,045	15,145	17.40%	54.54%	76.56%	82.25%	
Native American or Alaska Native alone (NH)	38	39	38	63	0.19%	0.18%	0.19%	0.34%	
Asian alone (NH)	157	141	75	56	0.77%	0.66%	0.38%	0.30%	
Native Hawaiian or Pacific Islander alone (NH)	N/A	6	4	1	N/A	0.03%	0.02%	0.01%	
Other race alone (NH)	83	50	24	159	0.23%	0.12%	0.86%		
Mixed race or Multiracial (NH)	N/A	309	412	550	N/A	0.41%	1.45%	2.10%	2.99%
Hispanic or Latino (any race)	203	220	244	332	1.00%	1.03%	1.24%	1.80%	
Total	21,337	19,650	18,413	100.00%	100.00%	100.00%			

=== 2020 census ===
As of the 2020 census, Spanish Lake had a population of 18,413. The median age was 33.5 years. 27.7% of residents were under the age of 18 and 12.9% of residents were 65 years of age or older. For every 100 females there were 82.7 males, and for every 100 females age 18 and over there were 75.2 males age 18 and over.

98.9% of residents lived in urban areas, while 1.1% lived in rural areas.

There were 7,298 households in Spanish Lake, of which 33.8% had children under the age of 18 living in them. Of all households, 25.7% were married-couple households, 20.5% were households with a male householder and no spouse or partner present, and 46.8% were households with a female householder and no spouse or partner present. About 32.9% of all households were made up of individuals and 11.2% had someone living alone who was 65 years of age or older.

There were 8,862 housing units, of which 17.6% were vacant. The homeowner vacancy rate was 2.7% and the rental vacancy rate was 19.8%.

Racial composition as of the 2020 census
Race	Number	Percent
White	2,167	11.8%
Black or African American	15,212	82.6%
American Indian and Alaska Native	70	0.4%
Asian	61	0.3%
Native Hawaiian and Other Pacific Islander	3	0.0%
Some other race	231	1.3%
Two or more races	669	3.6%
Hispanic or Latino (of any race)	332	1.8%

=== 2000 census ===
As of the census of 2000, there were 21,337 people, 8,381 households, and 5,673 families residing in the CDP. The population density was 2,900.4 inhabitants per square mile (1,119.9/km^{2}). There were 8,852 housing units at an average density of 1,203.3 per square mile (464.6/km^{2}). The racial makeup of the CDP was 42.25% White, 54.79% African American, 0.20% Native American, 0.66% Asian, 0.03% Pacific Islander, 0.46% from other races, and 1.61% from two or more races. Hispanic or Latino of any race were 1.03% of the population.

There were 8,381 households, out of which 38.3% had children under the age of 18 living with them, 39.4% were married couples living together, 23.6% had a female householder with no husband present, and 32.3% were non-families. 27.6% of all households were made up of individuals, and 8.9% had someone living alone who was 65 years of age or older. The average household size was 2.54 and the average family size was 3.09.

In the CDP, the population was spread out, with 30.4% under the age of 18, 9.9% from 18 to 24, 31.3% from 25 to 44, 17.3% from 45 to 64, and 11.0% who were 65 years of age or older. The median age was 31 years. For every 100 females, there were 86.0 males. For every 100 females age 18 and over, there were 79.0 males.

The median income for a household in the CDP was $37,410, and the median income for a family was $44,139. Males had a median income of $32,340 versus $26,644 for females. The per capita income for the CDP was $18,976. About 10.2% of families and 11.7% of the population were below the poverty line, including 18.4% of those under age 18 and 8.0% of those age 65 or over.

== Government ==
The National Archives has a facility in Spanish Lake.

== Education ==
Spanish Lake is in the Hazelwood School District.
