= Douglas Theatre Company =

Douglas Theatre Company was an American movie theater chain in based in Nebraska, operating in both Lincoln and Omaha. It was the 38th largest cinema chain in North America.

== Early years ==
The company was formed in 1952, by Russell Brehm and then-Senator Roman Hruska. Brehm and Senator Hruska wanted to build an entertainment company for Nebraska, by Nebraskans. The founders settled on naming the company "Douglas" because Omaha, in Douglas County, would be the location of their first venue: a drive-in theater, the 84th & Center, which opened the following year. In ensuing years, other drive-ins were built in Lincoln and Omaha, and temporary acquisitions were made in Texas as well.

In 1967, Douglas opened its first indoor theater in Omaha, the Cinema Center, which remained in operation until the company sold to Marcus in 2008. Three theaters were opened in Lincoln shortly thereafter: the Cinema Twin, in September 1971 (first showing Summer of '42 and Le Mans), Douglas 3, in March 1973 (first showing 2001: A Space Odyssey, The Sting and Serpico) and Plaza 4, in April 1973.

In the early 1970s, the Jerry Lewis Theater complex in Omaha was purchased and the name was changed to the "Maplewood Twin Cinema." The "Q-Twin Drive-in" and the "Q-4 Cinemas" were built and operated on 120th and Q Streets in Omaha.

In 1989, the Edgewood 3 theater opened in southeast Lincoln, at 56th & Hwy 2. It was remodeled, and reopened in April 2003, to include three additional screens and stadium seating. Having six screens, it also dropped the "3" from its name.

On November 21, 1997, the East Park theater at 66th & 'O' in Lincoln re-opened after remodeling. It was once part of a small indoor mall, which had been converted into strip shops.

== Peak years ==
On February 4, 2003, then-mayor of Lincoln Don Wesely announced plans for Douglas Theatres to build a $15 million, 14-screen megaplex downtown. On 8 August, demolition began to raze most of the buildings on the block bordered by 11th, 12th, O and P streets. After over a year of construction, The Grand opened on November 19, 2004. It took the place of four smaller theaters: the Lincoln, which was torn down to partially make way for the Grand, as well as the Cinema Twin, Douglas 3 and Plaza 4, which closed the night before the opening of the Grand. The Douglas 3 was demolished in October 2006 to make way for an urban park which is also a public wireless hotspot. The other two theaters remain vacant in downtown Lincoln as of August 2006. The Grand included over 3,000 stadium seats, and an arcade, "The Vault", which features a 60,000-pound vault door purchased from Wells-Fargo.

At its peak, Douglas Theatres had a total of 100 screens, including:

- East Park (Lincoln) - Sold to Marcus Theatres
- Edgewood Cinema (Lincoln) - Sold to Marcus Theatres
- Lincoln Grand (Lincoln) - Sold to Marcus Theatres
- SouthPointe Cinema (Lincoln) - Sold to Marcus Theatres
- 20 Grand (Omaha) - Sold to Marcus Theatres and later renamed The Majestic
- Maplewood Twin Cinemas (Omaha) - Closed
- Cinema Center (Omaha) - Closed
- Q-Cinema 9 (Omaha) - Closed
- Q-Twin Drive-in (Omaha) - Closed
- Twin Creek Cinema (Bellevue) - Sold to Marcus Theatres
- Village Pointe Cinema (Omaha) - Sold to Marcus Theatres

== Sale and closure ==
On March 26, 2008, it was announced that Marcus Theatres of Milwaukee, Wisconsin would buy seven Douglas Theatres, along with the name for $40.5 million. Cinema Center and Q-Cinema 9 in Omaha would continue to be owned by Douglas Theatres, and set close before summer, and Cinema Center would be set to close between October 2008 and February 2009.

Q-Cinema 9 officially closed on April 3, 2008, and the final Douglas location, the Cinema Center, closed its doors in January 2009.
