= Moline Acres, Missouri =

- City
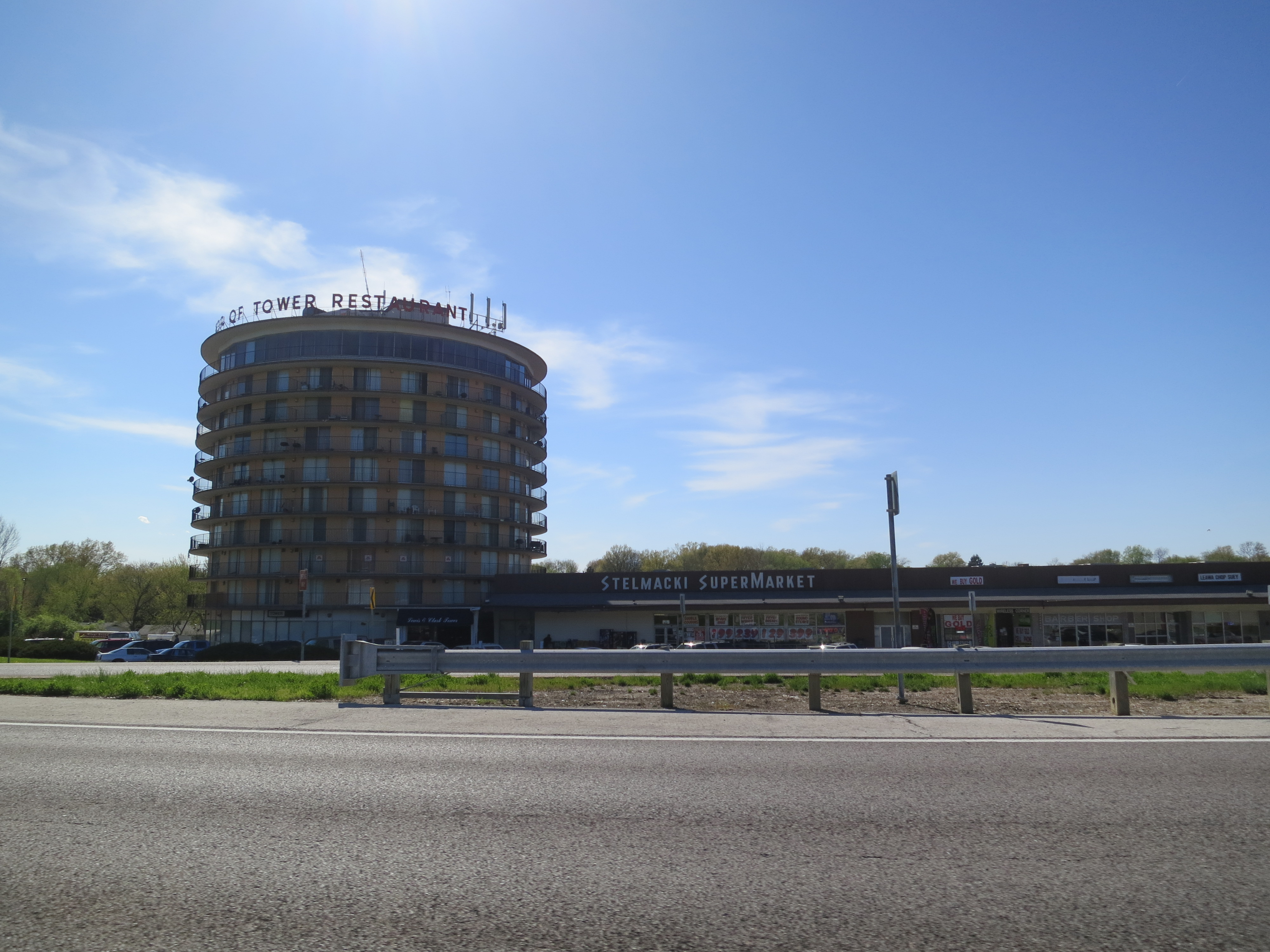
- Lewis & Clark Towers, an abandoned apartment building in Moline Acres, April 2013

- Location of Moline Acres, Missouri
- Coordinates: 38°44′47″N 90°14′34″W
- Country: United States
- State: Missouri
- County: St. Louis

Government
  - Mayor: Michele DeShay

Area
  - Total: 0.57 sq mi (1.48 km^{2})
  - Land: 0.57 sq mi (1.48 km^{2})
  - Water: 0 sq mi (0.00 km^{2})
- Elevation: 453 ft (138 m)

Population (2020)
  - Total: 2,156
  - Density: 3,764.0/sq mi (1,453.27/km^{2})
- Time zone: UTC-6 (Central (CST))
  - Summer (DST): UTC-5 (CDT)
- ZIP code: 63136, 63137
- Area code: 314
- FIPS code: 29-49088
- GNIS feature ID: 2395367
- Website: www.cityofmolineacres.org

Moline Acres is a city in St. Louis County, Missouri, United States. As of the 2020 census, Moline Acres had a population of 2,156.

== Geography ==
According to the United States Census Bureau, the city has a total area of 0.57 square miles (1.48 km^{2}), all land.

== Demographics ==
Historical population
Census	Pop.	Note	%±
1950	99		—
1960	3,132		3,063.6%
1970	3,722		18.8%
1980	2,774		−25.5%
1990	2,710		−2.3%
2000	2,662		−1.8%
2010	2,442		−8.3%
2020	2,156		−11.7%
U.S. Decennial Census

=== Racial and ethnic composition ===
Moline Acres city, Missouri – Racial and ethnic composition Note: the US Census treats Hispanic/Latino as an ethnic category. This table excludes Latinos from the racial categories and assigns them to a separate category. Hispanics/Latinos may be of any race.
Race / Ethnicity (NH = Non-Hispanic)	Pop 2000	Pop 2010	Pop 2020	% 2000	% 2010	% 2020
White alone (NH)	322	152	68	12.10%	6.22%	3.15%
Black or African American alone (NH)	2,274	2,238	2,011	85.42%	91.65%	93.27%
Native American or Alaska Native alone (NH)	1	6	5	0.04%	0.25%	0.23%
Asian alone (NH)	7	1	1	0.26%	0.04%	0.05%
Native Hawaiian or Pacific Islander alone (NH)	0	0	0	0.00%	0.00%	0.00%
Other race alone (NH)	7	0	12	0.26%	0.00%	0.56%
Mixed race or Multiracial (NH)	43	26	41	1.62%	1.06%	1.90%
Hispanic or Latino (any race)	8	19	18	0.30%	0.78%	0.83%
Total	2,662	2,442	2,156	100.00%	100.00%	100.00%

=== 2020 census ===
As of the 2020 census, Moline Acres had a population of 2,156. The median age was 37.6 years. 27.1% of residents were under the age of 18 and 16.7% of residents were 65 years of age or older. For every 100 females there were 80.0 males, and for every 100 females age 18 and over there were 68.9 males age 18 and over.

100.0% of residents lived in urban areas, while 0.0% lived in rural areas.

There were 837 households in Moline Acres, of which 34.3% had children under the age of 18 living in them. Of all households, 21.5% were married-couple households, 17.6% were households with a male householder and no spouse or partner present, and 55.1% were households with a female householder and no spouse or partner present. About 29.7% of all households were made up of individuals and 14.1% had someone living alone who was 65 years of age or older.

There were 952 housing units, of which 12.1% were vacant. The homeowner vacancy rate was 1.6% and the rental vacancy rate was 9.5%.

=== 2010 census ===
As of the census of 2010, there were 2,442 people, 942 households, and 643 families living in the city. The population density was 4,284.2 inhabitants per square mile (1,654.1/km^{2}). There were 1,043 housing units at an average density of 1,829.8 per square mile (706.5/km^{2}). The racial makeup of the city was 6.3% White, 92.1% African American, 0.2% Native American, 0.2% from other races, and 1.1% from two or more races. Hispanic or Latino of any race were 0.8% of the population.

There were 942 households, of which 36.6% had children under the age of 18 living with them, 26.8% were married couples living together, 35.0% had a female householder with no husband present, 6.5% had a male householder with no wife present, and 31.7% were non-families. 28.6% of all households were made up of individuals, and 9.7% had someone living alone who was 65 years of age or older. The average household size was 2.59 and the average family size was 3.16.

The median age in the city was 37.4 years. 27.1% of residents were under the age of 18; 9% were between the ages of 18 and 24; 23.2% were from 25 to 44; 28.2% were from 45 to 64; and 12.5% were 65 years of age or older. The gender makeup of the city was 42.8% male and 57.2% female.

=== 2000 census ===
As of the census of 2000, there were 2,662 people, 1,001 households, and 691 families living in the city. The population density was 4,720.6 inhabitants per square mile (1,822.6/km^{2}). There were 1,047 housing units at an average density of 1,856.7 per square mile (716.9/km^{2}). The racial makeup of the city was 12.17% White, 85.54% African American, 0.04% Native American, 0.26% Asian, 0.04% Pacific Islander, 0.26% from other races, and 1.69% from two or more races. Hispanic or Latino of any race were 0.30% of the population.

There were 1,001 households, out of which 35.6% had children under the age of 18 living with them, 34.5% were married couples living together, 30.5% had a female householder with no husband present, and 30.9% were non-families. 27.9% of all households were made up of individuals, and 8.4% had someone living alone who was 65 years of age or older. The average household size was 2.66 and the average family size was 3.24.

In the city, the population was spread out, with 30.4% under the age of 18, 9.0% from 18 to 24, 26.2% from 25 to 44, 24.1% from 45 to 64, and 10.2% who were 65 years of age or older. The median age was 34 years. For every 100 females, there were 77.5 males. For every 100 females age 18 and over, there were 72.8 males.

The median income for a household in the city was $32,229, and the median income for a family was $34,663. Males had a median income of $25,703 versus $26,467 for females. The per capita income for the city was $12,739. About 16.7% of families and 19.4% of the population were below the poverty line, including 25.1% of those under age 18 and 14.8% of those age 65 or over.

== Education ==
It is in the Riverview Gardens School District. Riverview Gardens High School is the district's comprehensive high school.

The St. Louis County Library Lewis and Clark Branch is located in Moline Acres.
