= Spanish Lake Township, St. Louis County, Missouri =

Township in St. Louis County, Missouri, U.S.

Coordinates: 38°48′53″N 90°14′50″W

Spanish Lake Township is a township in St. Louis County, in the U.S. state of Missouri. Its population was 35,967 as of the 2010 census.
