= St. Ferdinand Township, St. Louis County, Missouri =

Township in St. Louis County, Missouri

Coordinates: 38°34′27″N 90°14′25″W

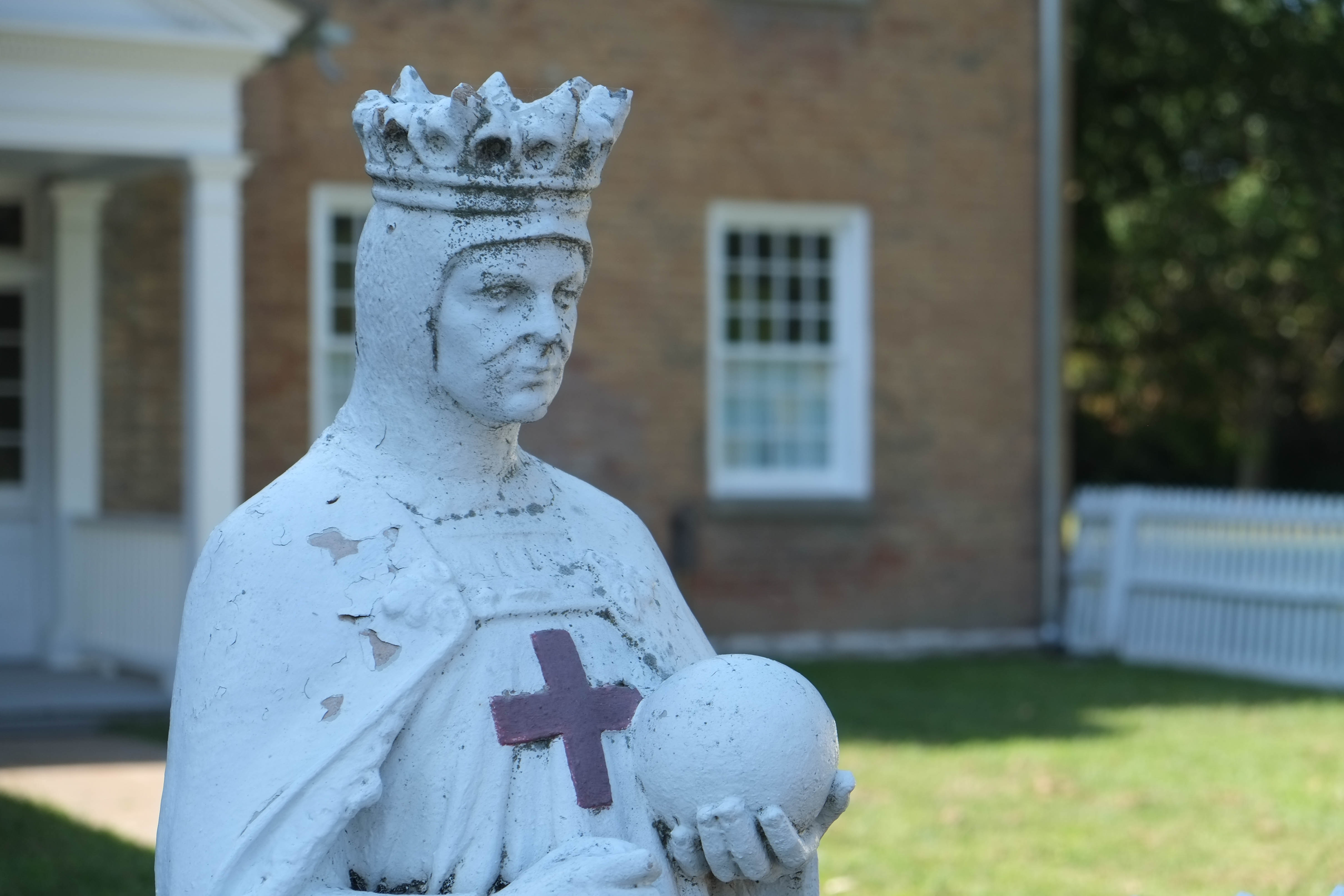
St. Ferdinand

St. Ferdinand Township is a township in St. Louis County, in the U.S. state of Missouri. Its population was 34,032 as of the 2010 census.

St. Ferdinand Township is named after St Ferdinand, the former name of Florissant, Missouri.
