= Hazelwood High School =

Hazelwood High School may refer to:

- Hazelwood West High School in Hazelwood, Missouri
- Hazelwood East High School in Hazelwood, Missouri
- Hazelwood Central High School in Hazelwood, Missouri

== See also ==
- Hazelwood School District
- Hazelwood School District v. Kuhlmeier
- Hazelwood School District v. United States
