= Van Quickenborne =

Van Quickenborne is a Dutch surname. Notable people with the surname include:

- Charles Felix Van Quickenborne (1788–1837), Belgian Jesuit
- Vincent Van Quickenborne (born 1973), Belgian politician
