= Joseph Husslein =

Jesuit social thinker

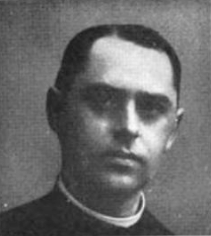
Joseph Husslein (January 1, 1917)

Joseph C. Husslein, S.J. (1873-1952) was a key figure in the early twentieth century in the development of American Catholic social thought. Husslein was one of several figures, such as John A. Ryan, trying to apply the Catholic social teaching of Pope Leo XIII’s watershed encyclical Rerum novarum (1891). In the next decades Husslein would write over 500 articles on Catholic social teaching. The national Jesuit weekly magazine America published most of these articles. Husslein worked as an editor of the magazine.

== Capital, Labor, and the Church ==
In books such as The Church and Social Problems (1912) and The World Problem: Capital, Labor, and the Church (1918) Husslein attacked the still significant socialist movement. However, at the same time, he attacked the abuses of laissez faire capitalism, which today is often called “free market capitalism.”

Husslein spoke against the exploitation of children and young women in factories and described the “champions of a modern gospel of greed” who are:

Coining into gold the lifeblood of the children whose innocence and joy were sacrificed to Mammon; tarnishing the purity of the poor girl victims of financial greed, the future mothers of our race; sapping the strength of womanhood amid endless unremunerative toil, and seeking only to secure the greatest service for the least reward.

== Democratic Industry ==
Husslein promoted the idea of worker-owned cooperative businesses in his 1919 book, Democratic Industry. He also wrote Work, Wealth and Wages (1921), Bible and Labor (1924), and The Christian Social Manifesto (1931). This last book is a commentary on the encyclical of Pope Pius XI, Quadragesimo anno (1931). Pius XI reaffirmed and further developed Catholic Social teaching as first laid out in Rerum novarum.

In his writings as early as 1919, Husslein called for equal pay for equal work for women. He was also one of the early promoters of the field of social work. In 1931, he organized what later became the School of Social Work at the Jesuit university in St. Louis. Social work was one of the first professional fields to welcome women as equals.

== A University in Print ==
In his time, only a few people could afford college, yet Husslein wanted to create a way for those who could not go to college to get an education, and so he created “A University in Print.” It was a series of books offering an education to anyone who read them. In the next decades Husslein would publish 213 books in two series: The Science and Culture Series and The Religion and Culture Series. In the latter, Husslein published the work of leading Catholic authors and included two books by Fulton Sheen.

A colleague of the famous Jesuit Daniel A. Lord, Husslein often spoke at Lord’s Summer School of Catholic Action.

== Books by Husslein ==
- The Church and Social Problems. (New York: America, 1912).
- The Catholic's Work in the World. (New York: Benziger, 1917).
- The World Problem: Capital, Labor and the Church. (New York: P. J. Kenedy, 1918).
- Democratic Industry. (New York: P. J. Kenedy, 1919).
- Bible and Labor. (New York: Macmillan, 1924).
- The Christian Social Manifesto: An Interpretative Study of the Encyclicals Rerum Novarum and Quadragesimo Anno of Pope Leo XIII and Pope Pius XI. (Milwaukee: Bruce, 1931).
- Husslein wrote a total of 19 books, including seven devotional books.

== Sources ==
- Werner, Stephen A. Prophet of the Christian Social Manifesto: Joseph Caspar Husslein, S.J. Milwaukee: Marquette University Press, 2000.
- __________. “The Life, Social Thought, and Work of Joseph Caspar Husslein,” Annual Publication of the College Theology Society 38, (1992) "Religions of the Book."
- __________. “Joseph Husslein and the American Catholic Literary Revival: 'A University in Print,’” Catholic Historical Review 87 (October 2001): 688-705.
- __________. "What Men Astutely Trained Got Wrong: Rescuing Daniel Lord, S.J., and Joseph Husslein, S.J., from Peter McDonough’s 'Hatchet Job'"
