= Brian Folkerts =

American football player (born 1990)

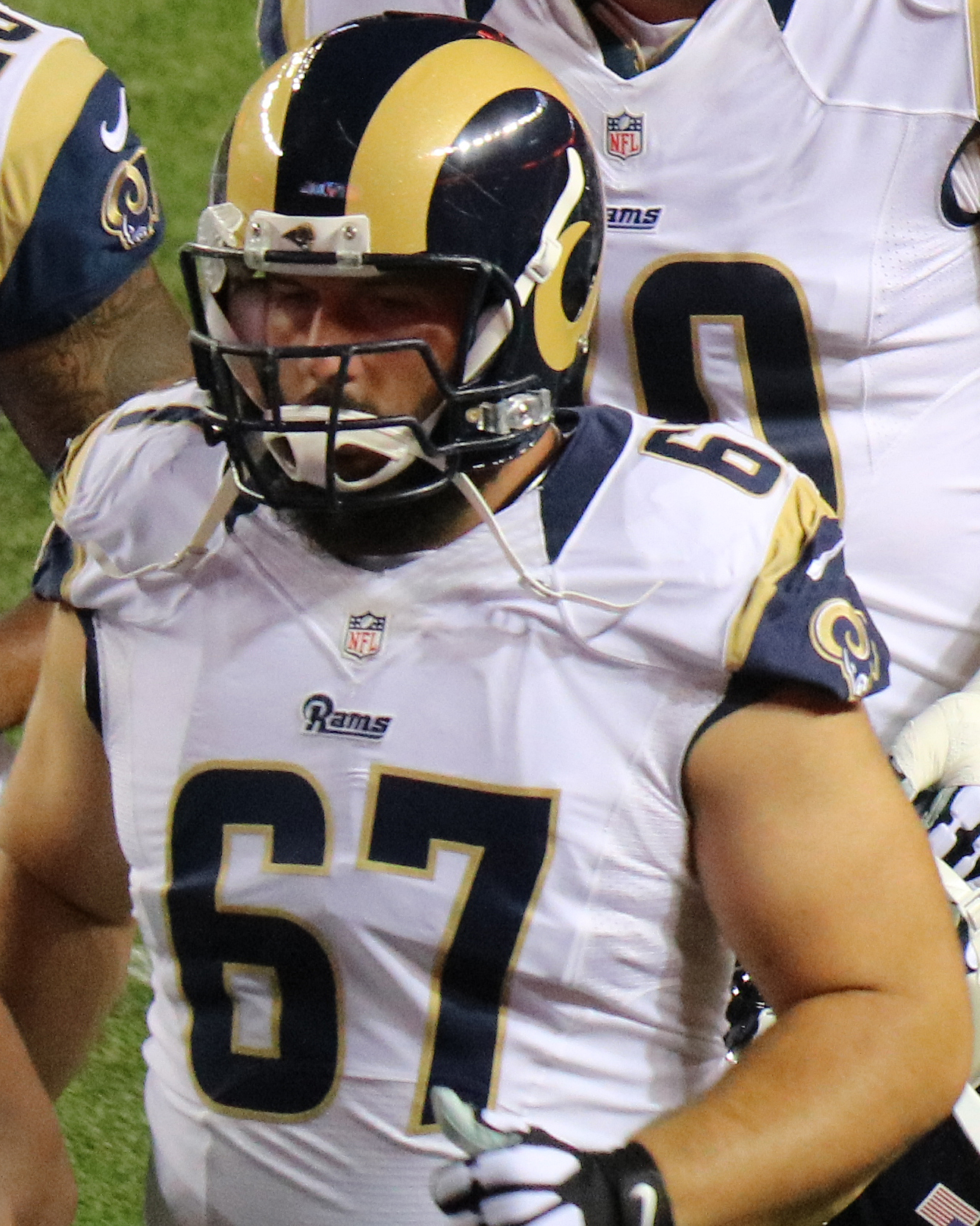
- Folkerts with the St. Louis Rams in 2015

Toledo Rockets
- Title: Offensive line coach

Personal information
- Born: January 30, 1990 (age 36); Florissant, Missouri, U.S.
- Listed height: 6 ft 4 in (1.93 m)
- Listed weight: 305 lb (138 kg)

Career information
- High school: Hazelwood (MO) Central
- College: Washburn
- NFL draft: 2012: undrafted

Career history

Playing
- New Orleans Saints (2012)*; Tampa Bay Buccaneers (2012)*; San Jose SaberCats (2013); Carolina Panthers (2013–2014); San Francisco 49ers (2015)*; St. Louis / Los Angeles Rams (2015); Carolina Panthers (2017)*; San Antonio Commanders (2019); St. Louis BattleHawks (2020); Arlington Renegades (2023)
- * Offseason or practice squad member only

Coaching
- Washburn (2020–2021) Offensive line coach; Wingate (2022) Tight ends coach & full backs coach; Wingate (2023) Offensive line coach; Northern Iowa (2024–2025) Tight ends coach & tackles coach; Toledo Rockets Offensive Line Coach (2025-Present)

Awards and highlights
- XFL champion (2023); Second-team All-MIAA (2009); 2× First-team All-MIAA (2010 & 2011)

Career NFL statistics
- Games played: 28
- Stats at Pro Football Reference

Career AFL statistics
- Rushing attempts: 9
- Rushing yards: 12
- Rushing touchdowns: 2
- Total tackles: 1
- Stats at ArenaFan.com

Brian Folkerts (born January 30, 1990) is an American former professional football center and current college football coach. He is the tight ends coach and tackles coach for Northern Iowa, a position he has held since 2024. He played college football at Washburn.

== Early life ==
Brian was born the son of Tim and Margie Folkerts. He has one sister, Julie Folkerts. He attended Hazelwood Central High School in Florissant, Missouri. There he was a two-sport athlete, playing both football and wrestling.

== College career ==
Folkerts attended Washburn University, where he played for the Washburn Ichabods football team from 2008 to 2011. Folkerts earned honorable mention All-Mid-America Intercollegiate Athletics Association (MIAA) as a freshman in 2008. As a sophomore in 2009, Folkerts was the Ichabods starting right tackle, earned second-team All-MIAA honors. During Folkerts junior season, he moved to left tackle, where he was named a first-team All-MIAA selection. His senior year, Folkerts was once again named a first-team All-MIAA selection, Folkerts also earned www.d2football.com's 2nd Team All-American honors in 2011.

== Professional career ==
=== Pre-draft ===
Prior to the 2012 NFL draft, Folkerts was projected to be undrafted by NFLDraftScout.com. He was rated as the fifty-first-best offensive guard in the draft. Folkerts was not invited to the 2012 NFL Scouting Combine in Indianapolis.

Folkerts attended the Kansas State Pro Day workout on March 27.

Pre-draft measurables
Height	Weight	40-yard dash	10-yard split	20-yard split	20-yard shuttle	Three-cone drill	Vertical jump	Broad jump	Bench press
6 ft 3 in (1.91 m)	303 lb (137 kg)	5.18 s	1.79 s	2.94 s	4.66 s	7.73 s	31.5 in (0.80 m)	9 ft 2 in (2.79 m)	35 reps
All values from Kansas State's Pro Day on March 27

=== New Orleans Saints ===
After going undrafted in the 2012 NFL Draft, Folkerts signed as an undrafted free agent with the New Orleans Saints of the National Football League (NFL). Folkerts was cut by the Saints on August 27.

=== San Jose SaberCats ===
Folkerts was signed by the San Jose SaberCats of the Arena Football League for the 2013 season. Folkerts played fullback for the SaberCats. He was placed on Other League Exempt status by the SaberCats on May 16, when he signed with the NFL's Carolina Panthers.

=== Carolina Panthers (first stint) ===
Folkerts survived the Panthers final cuts, and was placed on the active roster for Week 1 as a center. After the Panthers started the season 0–2, Folkerts was waived. He was re-signed to Panthers' practice squad on September 21, 2013. On September 5, 2015, he was released by the Panthers with an injury settlement.

=== San Francisco 49ers ===
On October 13, 2015, Folkerts was signed by the 49ers' practice squad.

=== St. Louis / Los Angeles Rams ===
On November 17, 2015, Folkerts was signed by the St. Louis Rams from the 49ers' practice squad. On August 30, 2016, he was released by the Rams.

=== Carolina Panthers (second stint) ===
On August 12, 2017, Folkerts re-signed with the Panthers. He was waived on September 1, 2017.

=== San Antonio Commanders ===
On December 27, 2018, Folkerts signed with the San Antonio Commanders of the Alliance of American Football (AAF). The league ceased operations in April 2019.

=== St. Louis BattleHawks ===
In October 2019, Folkerts was selected in the second round of the 2020 XFL draft by the St. Louis BattleHawks. He had his contract terminated when the league suspended operations on April 10, 2020.

=== Arlington Renegades ===
On November 17, 2022, Folkerts was drafted by the Arlington Renegades of the XFL. He was not part of the roster after the 2024 UFL dispersal draft on January 15, 2024.

== Coaching career ==
Folkerts coached two years at Washburn, two years at Wingate, and in 2024 was named the tight ends coach and tackles coach for Northern Iowa. In 2025 was named Offensive Line Coach for Mercer.^{[22]}
