= Stephen A. Werner =

College instructor and writer

Stephen Werner
- Born: 1956 (age 68–69)

Stephen A. Werner (born 1956) is a college instructor and writer from St Louis.

== Biography ==
=== Teaching ===
In the 1980's, Werner was a religion teacher and dean of academics at St. Louis Preparatory Seminary.

For over thirty years, Werner has taught as an adjunct instructor of the humanities at several universities in the St. Louis area. Along with courses on religion, theology, mythology, and history; he has taught courses on American culture covering such figures as Frank Sinatra and Elvis Presley.

=== Writing ===
Werner holds a Ph.D. in historical theology and his academic writing has focused on influential St. Louis Jesuits. In 1992, Werner published a biography of Joseph Husslein, S.J. (1873–1952), a key early 20th century figure in the development of American Catholic social thought; A reviewer describes it "as a fine introduction to Husslein and his work." In 2021, Werner published The Restless Flame, Daniel Lord, S.J.: Thinking Big in a Parochial World!, a biography of this influential Jesuit. “And I am certain anyone who gives this book a read will become fascinated with the man and the works of Daniel A. Lord. This is an excellent biography, and worth the read. I give it top marks.” Werner's documentary film Daniel Lord S.J., The Restless Flame appeared in the 2018 St. Louis Filmmakers Showcase.

Werner has also written on Dismas Clark, S.J. (1901–1963), who set up in St. Louis the first halfway house for men coming out of prison, and was portrayed in the 1961 movie The Hoodlum Priest. Two years after Clark died Frank Sinatra did a fundraiser for Dismas House with his famous Frank Sinatra Spectacular concert. Knowledgeable about Catholic figures and Catholic historical sites in the area, Werner has also written about Pretty Boy Floyd's arrest for a St. Louis crime, and a St. Louis man named Stanley Kowalski who may or may not have influenced Tennessee Williams.

Werner wrote The Handy Christianity Answer Book:, which was described by Library Journal as "an ideal ready reference … will interest young adults, general readers, Christians curious to learn more, and those who are spiritual but not religious and would like to explore the basics and some of the mysteries of the religion". However, Catholic Library Journal said the book was "oversimplified and lacks objectivity and selectivity" and "certainly not recommended for Catholic libraries."

Based on his years of teaching religion he wrote How to Study Religion: A Guide for the Curious, an introduction to religion for college students or for those who are curious about religion.

He also wrote the fourth (2020) edition of The Handy History Answer Book. The book received a positive review in Library Journal, "Anticipating basic questions, maintaining objectivity, and deploying an engaging style, Werner ably provides an introduction of Western history for general readers."

=== Other writing ===
Werner's other writings include Life Hurts: An Exploration of the Pain and Suffering of Life and a humorous satire: Elvis and Apocalypse: The Awful Disclosures of Maria, Matron of the Hotel Dew Beanery (Revised edition). "‘Elvis and the Apocalypse’ is a very clever, funny and engrossing read. These combined with its imaginative premise differentiates it from most other fiction books about Elvis and provide a strong reason why it is a worthwhile addition to any fan’s Elvis library." "'Elvis and the Apocalypse' is an unusual, enjoyable, satirical piece of fiction. Don't take it seriously, enjoy it, laugh with it."

=== Theatrical writing ===
He has also written and produced several theatrical works such as The Back Road to Bethlehem, a children's Christmas musical; A Streetcar Named Ramona Junction; The Rum Luck of the Irish, a light-hearted farce set in St. Louis during prohibition; and Tobit’s Triumph a musical based on the biblical Book of Tobit. He wrote and composed an opera, Damn, You Gilgamesh! based on the ancient story The Epic of Gilgamesh. Werner is also a composer. His song “Irish Farewell” is the most popular and is often performed at funerals around the world.

== Academic articles ==
- “The Life, Social Thought, and Work of Joseph Caspar Husslein,” Annual Publication of the College Theology Society 38 (1992), “Religions of the Book.”
- "The Significance of Joseph Husslein, S.J." Catholic Culture.
- “Joseph Husslein and the American Catholic Literary Revival: ‘A University in Print,’” Catholic Historical Review 87 (October 2001): 688-705.
- “Frank Sinatra and the Hoodlum Priest,” American Catholic Studies 129 (Winter 2016): 101-106.
- “Daniel A. Lord, SJ: A Forgotten Catholic Dynamo of the Early Twentieth Century,” American Catholic Studies 129 (Summer 2018): 39-58.
- "The tragedy of Joyce Kilmer, the Catholic poet killed in World War I." America, 219, No. 2 (July 27, 2018).
- “‘The Birth of a Nation’ sparked decades of racial violence. This Jesuit understood its unholy power.” America, 224, No. 2 (February 19, 2021).
- “Daniel Lord, SJ, the Restless Flame: Supporting Catholic Families,” College Theology Society Annual Volume 66 (2020),48-58.
- "Sixty Years Later, ‘Black Like Me’ is Still Relevant for the Catholic Church." America (December 29, 2021).
- “Daniel Lord, S.J.: Booster for the American Nun,” St. Louis Cultural History Project (Spring 2022).
- "Charles Arthur Floyd: The Pretty Boy in St. Louis," St. Louis Cultural History Project (Summer 2022).
- “In Search of Stanley Kowalski,” St. Louis Cultural History Project (Summer 2022).
- “The Real Man Behind ‘The Hoodlum Priest’” America (October 7, 2024).
