= Judith G. O'Connor =

American politician

Member of the Missouri House of Representatives from the 30th, 70th, 76th district
- In office 1971–1992

Personal details
- Born: December 1, 1936 (age 89) St. Louis, Missouri, U.S.
- Party: Democratic
- Spouse: Patrick J. O'Connor (m. 1959)
- Children: 4, including Pat O'Connor
- Occupation: politician

Judith G. O'Connor (born December 1, 1936) is a former American politician who served as a Missouri state representative. She was first elected in a special election on June 29, 1971, to fill the vacancy created by the death of her husband on June 7, 1971. She had married Patrick J. O'Connor in 1959 in St. Louis County, Missouri, with whom she had four children. She was educated at St. Edwards Elementary School and at Incarnate Word High School.

She is the mother of Missouri state representative Patrick James O'Connor Jr.
