= Death of LaVena Johnson =

United States Army soldier

LaVena Johnson
- Born: July 27, 1985; Florissant, Missouri, U.S.
- Died: July 19, 2005 (aged 19); Balad, Saladin Governorate, Iraq
- Military career
- Allegiance: United States
- Branch: United States Army
- Service years: 2004–2005
- Rank: Private first class (PFC)
- Awards: Army Good Conduct Medal; Army Commendation Medal

LaVena Lynn Johnson (July 27, 1985 – July 19, 2005) was a soldier in the United States Army who was found dead in a tent in Iraq. Her death was controversially ruled as a suicide, but the evidence of rape and battery led her family to believe the United States Department of Defense covered it up.

== Biography ==
The daughter of John Johnson, a service veteran, and Linda Johnson, LaVena was born and grew up in Florissant, Missouri.

Johnson enlisted in the Army on September 15, 2004, after graduating from Hazelwood Central High School. She was deployed to Iraq and stationed in Balad. She had been there for eight weeks before her death on July 19, 2005, eight days before her 20th birthday.

== Death and controversy ==
Johnson's death was officially ruled a suicide by the Department of Defense. However, her father became suspicious when he saw her body in the funeral home and decided to investigate. Initially the Army refused to release information, but did so under the Freedom of Information Act after Representative William Lacy Clay, Jr. raised questions about it at the congressional hearings over Pat Tillman's death.

The autopsy report and photographs revealed Johnson had a broken nose, black eye, loose teeth, burns from a corrosive chemical on her genitals, and a gunshot wound to her mouth that seemed inconsistent with suicide. Several reporters have suspected that the chemical burns were the result of attempts to destroy DNA evidence of a rape. Additionally, bloody footprints were discovered outside of her living quarters.

A spokesman from the House Armed Services Committee said that the committee was looking into Johnson's death, but they were not yet committing to a formal investigation in June 2008. Christopher Grey, chief of public affairs for the U.S. Army Criminal Investigative Command, has said that the case remains closed as far as they are concerned

Following a February 2007 KMOV news report on Johnson's death, an online petition addressed to the House Armed Services Committee and the Senate Armed Services Committee was launched, closing with 37,319 supporters. This was followed by the creation of an official LaVena Johnson website dedicated to developments in prompting a new Army investigation of her death. The petition closed on May 24, 2008, with nearly 12,000 signatures; preparations are being made for delivery to the two committees. In July 2008, the online black activist group Color of Change launched another online petition calling on Henry Waxman, chair of the House Oversight Committee, to conduct a hearing into LaVena Johnson's death and the Army's handling of her case and others like it.

A documentary film about LaVena Johnson's family's struggle for justice was made in 2010, directed by Joan Brooker and titled LaVena Johnson: The Silent Truth.

On July 19, 2011, the criminal justice students in the Cold Case Investigative Research Institute (CCIRI) run as a student club by three universities, selected Johnson's case as their case for investigation. The CCIRI's crime scene reconstruction aimed to help shed light on this case that has attracted worldwide attention. The CCIRI investigation did not agree with nor dispute the Army's findings. Sheryl McCollum of the Cold Case Investigative Research Institute calls the case "gut-wrenching." McCollum says the institute normally spends one year on a case, but spent three years on the LaVena Johnson case. In a phone interview with St. Louis Public Radio, McCollum said that she faults the Army for poor communication, but she does not disagree with its conclusion.

"The problem is – number one – the way the notification happened. And the lack of information given to that family fast enough," McCollum said. "There was nothing about this case that we could go back to the Army to say you need to re-look at it," she said. "We didn't have anything new. We didn't have anything that suggested wrongdoing."

== See also ==
- Pat Tillman
- Gloria D. Davis
