= Gittemeier House =

Historic building in Missouri, United States

General information
- Address: 1067 Dunn Road
- Town or city: Florissant, Missouri
- Country: United States
- Coordinates: 38°46′27.86″N 90°19′7.64″W
- Completed: 1860; 165 years ago

The Gittemeier House is a historic building in Florissant, Missouri, built by Franz Gittemeier in 1860. The house has been preserved and now serves as the headquarters of Historic Florissant, the local historical society.

== Description ==
The Gittemeier House is a red-brick, two-story farmhouse sitting on 0.4 acres (0.16 ha). It was built in the Federal style, noted for simple design with Southern influences. It is located on what is now Dunn Road in Florissant.

== History ==
Franz Gittemeier was born in Westphalia, Germany, in 1826. He immigrated to the United States in 1850. Franz was hired as a farmworker near Bridgeton, Missouri and soon decided to mine for gold in California. He mined gold for seven years and came back to Florissant, Missouri with enough gold to purchase 50 acres (20 ha) of farmland and build the two-story Gittemeier House in 1860.

Franz and his wife, Gertude, raised ten children in the house. They prospered and he eventually owned 500 acres (200 ha) of land. According to family legend, each of Franz's children received a farm and $10,000 (equivalent to $306,000 in 2023) upon his death on September 7, 1891.

In 1938, Mae Pondrum purchased the property. Mae and her descendants occupied the house until 1990.

In May 1990, Shell Oil Company acquired the property for $175,000 (equivalent to $361,000 in 2023) to build a convenience store, gas station, and car wash. Shell was planning to destroy the house, but instead donated the property to the non-profit Historic Florissant for restoration due to the community's desires to preserve the house.

A ceremony was held on July 30, 1991, where Shell presented the keys and deed to Rosemary Davison, president of Historic Florissant. Shell made the stipulation that the exterior of the house would be renovated within a year. Historic Florissant convinced a bank to lend them $65,000 (equivalent to $134,000 in 2023) to restore the house.

Today, the Gittemeier House is used by Historic Florissant as an office, resource center, and archive. It is also available by appointment for small events and gatherings.

== See also ==
- National Register of Historic Places listings in St. Louis County, Missouri, which includes a number of other historic houses in Florissant
