= Hazelwood West High School =

Public school in St. Louis County, Missouri

Location
- 1 Wildcat Lane; Hazelwood, Missouri 63042; United States; 38°47′10″N 90°22′55″W

Information
- Former names: Hazelwood West Jr./Sr. High (1975–2002); Hazelwood West Middle/High School (2002–2007)
- Type: Public high school
- Established: 1975; 51 years ago
- School district: Hazelwood School District
- NCES District ID: 291383000625
- Principal: Demetrius Adams
- Faculty: 130
- Teaching staff: 109.06 (on an FTE basis)
- Grades: 9–12
- Enrollment: 2,040 (2023–24)
- Student to teacher ratio: 18.71
- Colors: Red and black
- Fight song: "On, Wisconsin!"
- Athletics conference: Suburban Conference
- Mascot: Willie/Wanda the Wildcat
- Nickname: Wildcats
- Accreditation: MSIP
- Newspaper: West Gazette
- Yearbook: Focus
- Website: whs.hazelwoodschools.org

Hazelwood West High School is a public high school located in Hazelwood, Missouri. It is one of three high schools in Hazelwood School District in St. Louis County, Missouri, alongside Hazelwood Central and Hazelwood East.

== History ==
Hazelwood West High School began in 1974, with the first graduating class in 1975. Due to overcrowding of Hazelwood Senior High School (now known as Hazelwood Central), students attended classes on split shift in afternoons. The building that would partially become Hazelwood West opened in 1969 as a junior high school, Howdershell Jr. High. A greatly expanded building opened as a six-year facility in the fall of 1975, housing students in grades seven through twelve. In 2002, all district junior high schools were renamed middle schools. In 2005, two new building additions were added, a band room near the main entrance and a three-story classroom wing in the rear of the former middle school section. With the completion of six new middle schools in 2007; Central Middle, North Middle, Northwest Middle, East Middle, Southeast Middle, and West Middle; Hazelwood West was designated solely as a high school.

== Notable alumni ==
- LaMark Brown 2007, NFL player
- Morgan Burkhart 1990, MLB player
- Darius Cooper 2020, NFL player
- Trevor Gaylor 1996, NFL player
- LaVena Johnson 2004, soldier
- Kyle McClellan 2002, MLB player
- Al Nipper 1977, MLB player
- Pat O'Connor 1978, Missouri House of Representatives
- David Phelps 2005, MLB player
- Rob Riti 1995, All-American football player
- Justin Robinson 2020, track and field athlete
- Tom Sandoval 2001, model, actor, television personality
- Devin Williams 2013, MLB player
- Matt Winer 1987, sports journalist and television personality
- Jeffrey Wittmer 2003, Olympic weightlifter
- Clint Zweifel 1992, treasurer of Missouri
