= Old St. Ferdinand Shrine =

- St. Ferdinand's Shrine Historic District
- U.S. National Register of Historic Places
- U.S. Historic district
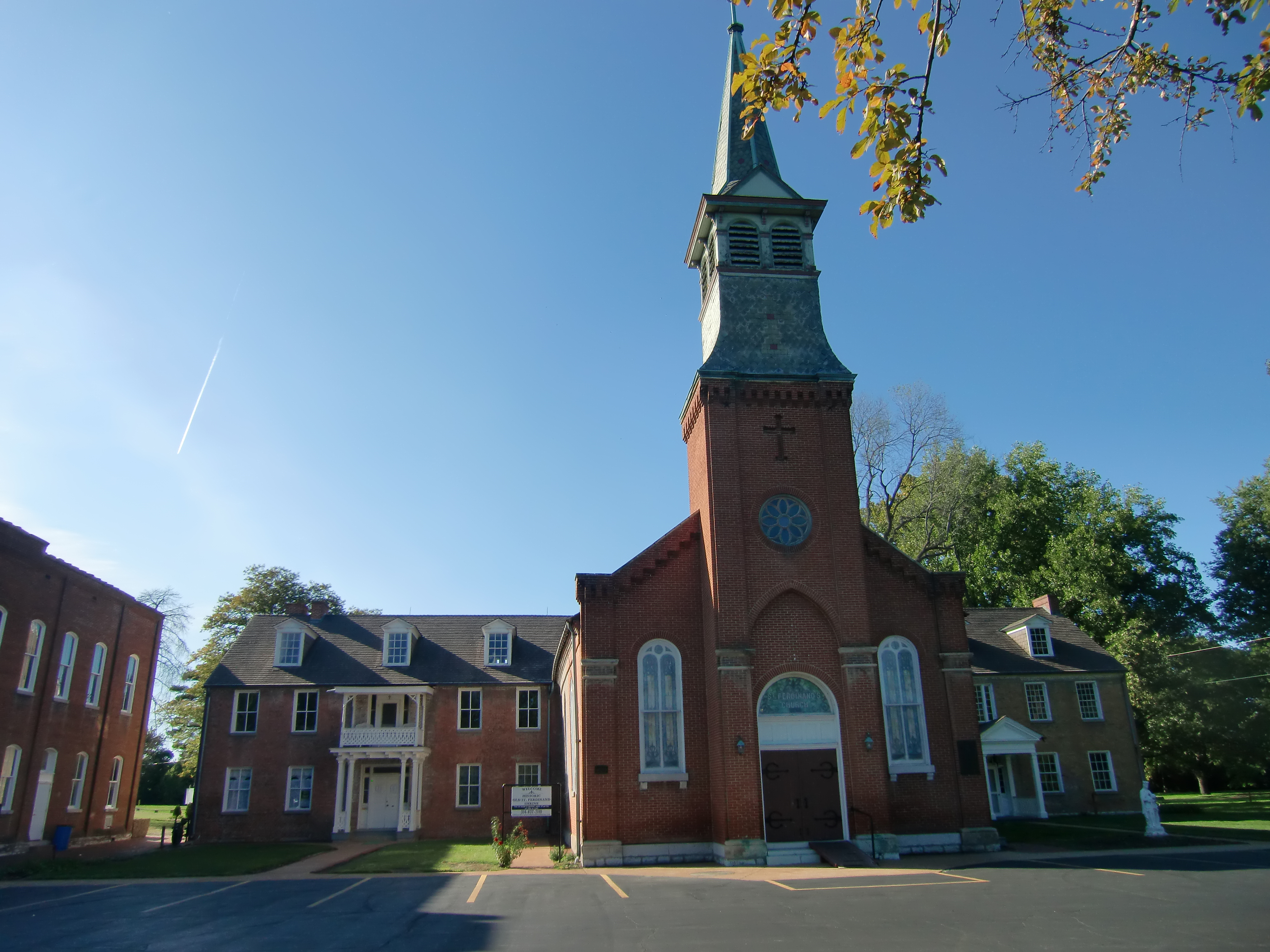

- Location within Missouri Location within the United States
- Location: Between Cold Water and Fountain Creeks, Florissant, Missouri
- Coordinates: 38°47′47″N 90°20′2″W
- Built: 1819
- Architectural style: Federal
- MPS: St. Ferdinand City MRA
- NRHP reference No.: 79003759
- Added to NRHP: September 12, 1979

Old St. Ferdinand Shrine and Historic Site is a historic Catholic shrine and former parish church located at no. 1 rue St. Francois, Florissant, Missouri. The Shrine and Historic Site consists of four historic buildings on their original locations: the 1819 convent, 1821 church, 1840 rectory, and 1888 schoolhouse.

The complex was the center of St. Ferdinand Parish, and the area which became the city of Florissant was also known as the city of St. Ferdinand.

The convent, church, and rectory today are open for historic tours and religious pilgrimages. The schoolhouse may be used for public or private gatherings. Artifacts from virtually every era in Old St. Ferdinand's history are on display in the museum and throughout the buildings. The complex is owned, preserved, maintained, and protected by the non-profit organization, Friends of Old St. Ferdinand, Inc.

== Significance ==
The site represents a physical link to French and Spanish colonial times, the North American Jesuit Missions to the Native Americans as well as the home of Catholic education in the Midwest. The 1819 convent is the site of the first Catholic school between the Mississippi River and Rocky Mountains. The 1821 Church is the oldest remaining church building built between the Mississippi River and Rockies Mountains. It was the home of the region's only canonized Catholic saint, Saint Rose Philippine Duchesne.

== History ==
Around 1767, just a few years after Pierre Laclede and August Chouteau established the fur-trading village of St. Louis, French plantation owners settled in an area they called "Fleurissant."

In 1782, August Chouteau named François Dunegant the "Commandant of Fleurissant" and charged him with protecting the settlement from Indian attacks. The Louisiana Territory had been ceded to Spain in 1763 and a 1788 census identified the settlement as "St. Ferdinand" with a population of 40 with seven plantations. At that time, Dunegant issued a land grant to establish a church and priest's residence.

Local carpenter, Hyacenthe Deshetres oversaw the construction of the church. In 1789, Father Bernard de Limpach, a Capuchin friar, began serving as the first pastor. The church was built on the current site of Spanish Land Grant Park, on the southeast corner of the block bounded by rue St. Charles, rue St Ferdinand, rue St. Louis, and rue St. Denis. A parish cemetery was located next to the log church. The church was the center of ecclesiastical and civic life in St. Ferdinand de Fleurissant. While the church was used for sacramental and devotional purposes, the area outside its doors was used for proclamations, business and real-estate transactions, and meetings of a public nature. The old log church from the 1780s succumbed to a fire in 1836.

In 1818, Bishop Louis Dubourg arrived in St. Louis to establish his residence and Episcopal see. He went a long way to attract Catholic missionaries and educators to settlements throughout the territory, serving both pioneers from Europe and Native Americans. St. Ferdinand would be directly affected by DuBourg's evangelization program in the Upper Louisiana Purchase Territory. Among the religious DuBourg recruited following his ordination as bishop in 1815 was a member of the recently formed Religious of the Sacred Heart, Mother Rose Philippine Duchesne.

Duchesne established the first Catholic school for girls west of the Mississippi in St. Charles, Missouri, in 1818, then in 1819 relocated to Florissant. Later, she founded nine schools in the Louisiana Territory and received the vows of the first American women to enter religious life in the Midwest. She succeeded in getting Jesuits to settle in Florissant, and in 1840 to build a large, enduring rock building from limestone with walnut beams, the centerpiece of their St. Stanislaus Seminary until they moved away in 1971. In her last years she would be called "Quah-kah-ka-num-ad" or "Woman-who-prays-always" by members of the Patowamie tribe. Pope John Paul II canonized St. Rose Philippine Duchesne in 1988.

=== The 1819 convent ===
The convent was built in the Federal Style under the supervision of Father Duran, a Trappist monk who was serving as pastor. The sisters arrived in time for Christmas 1819, where Father de la Croix offered the first Mass in the chapel at midnight on December 24. The convent was the home to the Religious of the Sacred Heart and to boarding students (girls) and served as a school for both French-speaking, English-speaking, and Native American students. Many extant personal letters from Philippine Duchesne and the students provide a glimpse into the daily hardships, Catholic devotions, and personal interactions of residents of the convent. It would be the saint's home from 1819–1827 and from 1834-1840.

The first floor of the convent includes a chapel, two parlors, and a refectory (dining room). Beneath the staircase to the second floor is a small closet in which Mother Duchesne slept so she could be close to the chapel. The second floor and attic space was used as a convent community room, dormitories, a novitiate, and infirmary.

The Religious of the Sacred Heart left St. Ferdinand in 1846 and were replaced in 1847 by the Sisters of Loretto. The Sisters of Loretto convent was enlarged but the addition was removed, preserving only the original part known by St. Philippine Duchesne.

=== The 1821 church ===
The current church replaced the old log church in 1821. The current church is the oldest west of the Mississippi and east of the Rocky Mountains.

Mother Duchesne paid for the cornerstone of the church. Out of deference to her principal personal devotions to the Sacred Heart of Jesus and St. Francis Regis, the church was dedicated to the Sacred Heart under the invocation of St. Ferdinand III and St. Francis Regis.

For the education of boys and missionary work among the indigenous people Bishop DuBourg invited the Jesuits. Charles Van Quickenborne arrived in Florissant with a large group of Belgian novices in 1823. He was promptly put in charge of the parish. The Jesuits served there for the entire duration of the parish. Famous missionary to the Native Americans Pierre-Jean DeSmet, S.J., was ordained a priest in St. Ferdinand church in 1827.

Fr. DeSmet traveled 180,000 miles visiting almost every Native American tribe the West and crossing the Atlantic a total of nineteen times to solicit financial support from nearly every European nation. He established Catholic missions at the request of tribal chiefs and bishops. DeSmet arranged peace between warring tribes, calmed uprisings and negotiated a treaty for the U.S. government eventually befriending the famous chief, Sitting Bull. Even Protestant writers remarked that he was the sincerest friend to the Native Americans. Fr. DeSmet returned to St. Ferdinand regularly to minister to the parishioners, seek Mother Duchesne's help, and consult fellow Jesuits.

Bishop Joseph Rosati, the first bishop of St. Louis, consecrated the church in 1832. The church was lengthened in 1880.

=== The 1840 rectory ===
The rectory was home to the Jesuit priests that served St. Ferdinand. The first floor consisted of rooms for parish meetings and the second floor was the residential space for the priests.

=== The 1888 schoolhouse ===
A parish school was constructed in 1888 and a second floor was added in 1889.

=== Historic recognition and designation as a shrine ===
In 1955 Old St. Ferdinand ceased to be a parish and the boundaries were redrawn. The Friends of Old St. Ferdinand, Inc. was established in 1958 to maintain and preserve the historic structures. Fire damaged the Church and rectory in 1966 but they were completely repaired and restored.

Cardinal John Carberry, Archbishop of St. Louis, transferred all buildings and property to the Friends of Old St. Ferdinand in 1978. All four buildings were included on the National Register of Historic Places in 1979 as the St. Ferdinand's Shrine Historic District. With the canonization of Duchesne in 1988, the Archdiocese of St. Louis designated the historic complex as a shrine to St. Rose Philippine Duchesne.

=== Damage ===
On July 26, 2022, Old St. Ferdinand Shrine was submerged with loads of water caused by major flooding. The historic building sustained water damage after the flooding incident.
