= Ira Vandever =

American football player (born 1980)

Ira Matthew Vandever (born November 22, 1980) is an American former football quarterback. He attended McCluer North High School in Florissant, Missouri, where he was a two-year starter, and also Drake University in Des Moines, Iowa, where he was a four-year starter. During his time at Drake, Vandever set 15 individual records as well as helped Drake win the Pioneer Football League in 2000. He was also the starting quarterback for the Stuttgart Scorpions in the German Football League.

== Early life ==
Vandever was born on a Navajo reservation.

== Drake University ==
As a freshman, Vandever split quarterback duties with Solon Bell. As a sophomore, he led the Bulldogs to a Pioneer Football League championship in his first year as a full-time starter. By the end of his tenure at Drake, Vandever set records in career passing yards (7,868), most net passing yards in a season (3,239), most passes completed in a season (205), most passes attempted in a season (361) and in a game (51), highest completion percentage in a career (.548), most touchdown passes in a career (67), most touchdown passes in a season (32), most touchdown passes in a game (6), most career interceptions (35), most yards total offense in a career (9,161), a season (3,654), and a game (464), and most total offensive plays in a career (1,353) and a season (488), and a game (66).
