= Charles Felix Van Quickenborne =

Belgian Jesuit (1788–1837)

Charles Felix Van Quickenborne, SJ (1788–1837) was a Belgian Jesuit born best known as a missionary and a founder of St. Louis University. He served as novice master of the Jesuit novitiate at White Marsh, Maryland, and later when it was moved to St. Thomas Manor in Charles County. His missionary work took him to the areas of Missouri, Kansas, and Iowa.

== Early life ==
Van Quickenborne was born in Petegem, near Deinze, Belgium, on 21 January 1788. He became a Jesuit in Ghent, Belgium, in 1815, and, at his request, was sent to the American Missions in 1817. He was appointed Superior and Novice Master of the Jesuit novitiate in White Marsh, Maryland, in 1819. In light of the unsuitable conditions at White Marsh, he and Jesuit Provincial Charles Neale decided to transfer the Jesuit novitiate to St. Thomas Manor in St. Charles County, Maryland.

== Missouri ==
In the early 1820s the Bishop of the Louisiana Territory, Louis Du Bourg, invited the Society of Jesus to come to the newly admitted state of Missouri. Van Quickenborne volunteered, and was accompanied by six young Belgian Jesuits and six African-American enslaved people: Moses and Nancy Queen, Thomas and Molly Brown, and Isaac and Susan Hawkins, each husband and wife. Thomas and Molly Brown and Moses and Nancy Queen were in their 40s; while Thomas and Molly Brown were childless, Moses and Nancy Queen were forced to leave their children.

Flemish priest Charles de la Croix came to Florissant, Missouri in 1818. The area was predominantly French-speaking. By the time the Jesuits arrived in early June 1823, he had nearly completed a brick church, started a farm. Van Quickenborne was placed in charge of Sacred Heart Parish. That same year, he founded St. Stanislaus Seminary, on the farm on the outskirts of town. It was named for Jesuit Stanislaus Kostka. The Queens, Browns, and the Hawkins worked the farm to support the mission. Pierre-Jean De Smet was a student at the seminary.

When Father de la Croix was later appointed to St. Michael's parish in lower Louisiana, Van Quickenborne took over his work among the Osage People farther west. His first visit was in 1827. Many of the Osage had known him in eastern Missouri before they had moved west and they made him welcome.

In the summer of 1833, Van Quickenborne organized the Catholics of Dubuque, Iowa into the Parish of St. Raphael. The parish did not have a regular church building yet, so the members met at various homes for mass. The later became the cathedral seat of the Archdiocese of Dubuque.

Researchers have noted van Quickenborne's refusal to address reports of abuse of enslaved African Americans in Missouri, when he served as superior. He was at one point involved in an altercation with two women who were "furious" with his tepid response.

== St. Regis Seminary ==
Van Quickenbourne had opened St. Regis Seminary, a boarding school for young Native American boys, at Florissant, Mo. in May 1824. In late 1824 he wrote to the Superior General of the Jesuits about opening a college in St. Louis on land he had purchased at auction. The beginnings of Saint Louis University as a Jesuit institution may be dated from the period (second half of 1825) at which white students were first received at St. Regis.

Researchers have noted van Quickenborne's harsh treatment of children at St. Regis, including slavery-like conditions and physical abuse.

== First recorded Kansas baptism ==
The following is the first certified baptism:

- "A neosho chez Mr. Ligueste Chouteau", (at Neosho in the home of Mr. Ligueste Chouteau), 27 August 1827, Father Van Quickenborne baptized Henri Mongrain, "Son of Noel pere and of Tonpapai, age two years, sponsor Mr. Ligueste P. Chouteau" (baptismal register, St. Ferdinand's church, Florissant, Missouri). Father Van Quickenborne said the first verifiable Mass in Kansas two days earlier at St. Paul in Neosho County.
- In 1837, Father Van Quickenborne baptized 14 Indian children in a Potawatomi camp just outside Fort Leavenworth.

== Death ==
Charles Felix Van Quickenborne died on 17 August 1837 at age 49 at Portage Des Sioux, Missouri. He was buried at St. Charles, Missouri before being moved to Florissant. He was later interred at the nearly consecrated cemetery at St. Stanislaus'.

His missionary work among the Kickapoos was taken over by the Dutch Jesuit Father Christian Hoecken.
