= St. Stanislaus Seminary =

- U.S. National Register of Historic Places
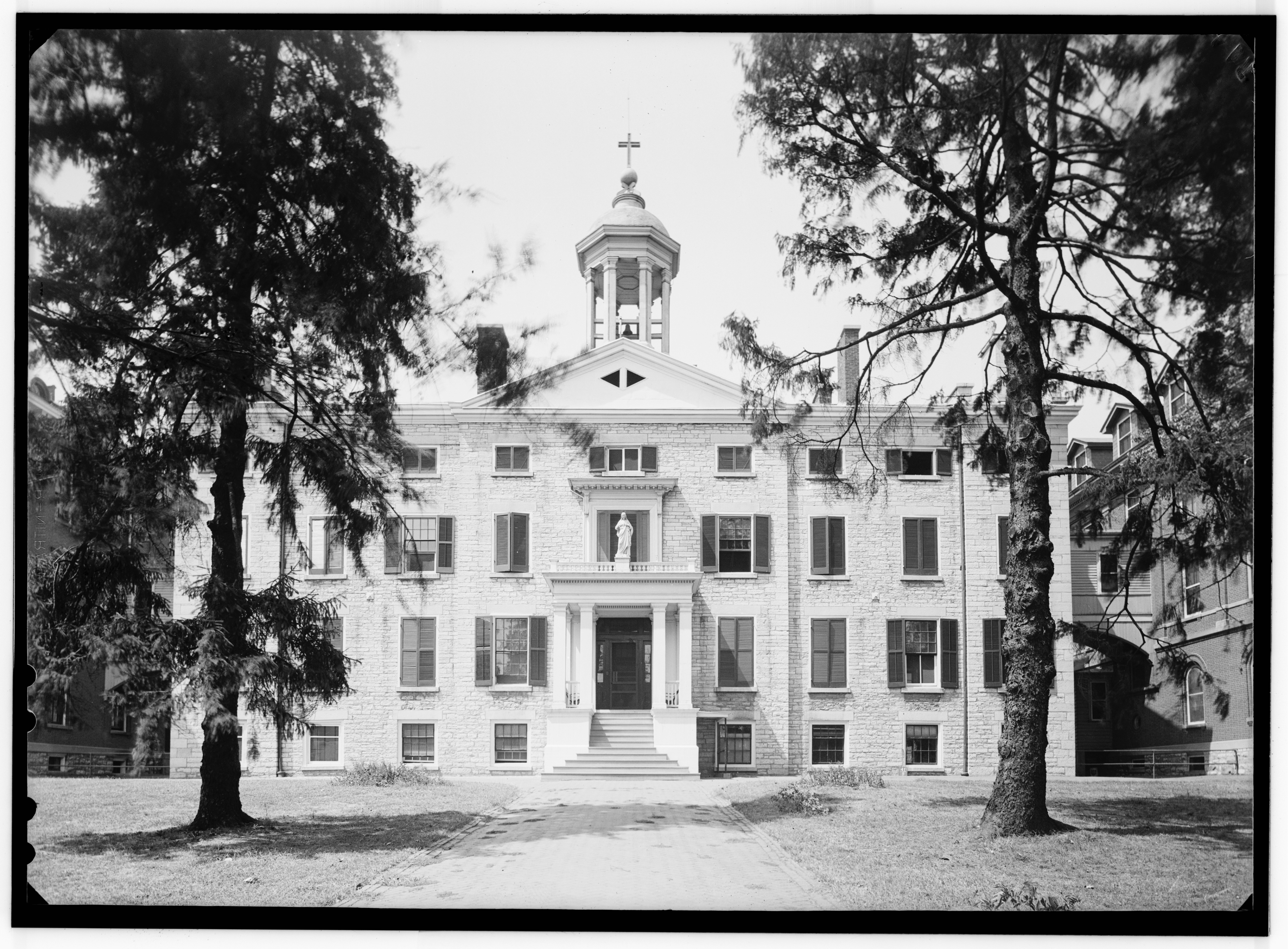
- St. Stanislaus Seminary in 1936

- Location within Missouri Location within the United States
- Location: 700 Howdershell Rd., Hazelwood, Missouri
- Coordinates: 38°48′6″N 90°21′58″W
- Area: 9.9 acres (4.0 ha)
- Built: 1840
- Architectural style: Greek Revival
- NRHP reference No.: 72001491
- Added to NRHP: September 22, 1972

St. Stanislaus Seminary is a former Society of Jesus (Jesuits) seminary that was founded in 1823 on the outskirts of Florissant, Missouri within the current municipal limits of Hazelwood, Missouri. It was the longest continuously operated Jesuit novitiate in the United States.

== History ==
=== Working life ===
In 1823 Belgian Jesuit Charles Felix Van Quickenborne, Novice Master of St. Thomas Manor in St. Charles County, Maryland, came to Florissant at the invitation of Bishop Louis William Valentine DuBourg. Accompanying him were another priest, seven Jesuit novices, three lay-brothers, and three African-American enslaved couples: Moses and Nancy Queen, Thomas and Molly Brown, and Isaac and Susan Hawkins. Van Quickenbourne was placed in charge of the Parish of the Sacred Heart.

The seminary began in 1824 as St. Francis Regis Seminary, a residential school for indigenous children, initially from the Sauk and Iowa people. It was funded by John C. Calhoun on personal request by Louis W. V. DuBourg. The facility was comprising some log buildings and a large farm worked by the enslaved people to support the missionaries. As the indigenous people moved farther west and south, the school ceased operation in 1831, and the onsite novitiate was expanded. It was named for Stanislaus Kostka.

The main building, now known as the Old Rock Building, was built from 1840 to 1849 from limestone quarried by the Jesuits and the enslaved people. It became the novitiate. Pierre-Jean De Smet was a student at St. Stanislaus, as well as Peter Joseph Arnoudt. and Adrian Hoecken.

The seminary was closed in 1971 due to fewer religious vocations and the post-Vatican II movement to urban areas. Two years earlier, it had already transferred its collegiate program to Saint Louis University. Most of what was left of the property, 35 acres (140,000 m^{2}), was sold to the Missouri District of the United Pentecostal Church International, and then the property housed Urshan College (formerly Gateway College of Evangelism) and Urshan Graduate School of Theology. The Old Rock Building and 4 acres (16,000 m^{2}) of land remained Jesuit property until 2003.

=== Museum ===
In 1973, the seminary became the Museum of the Western Jesuit Missions, but closed again in 2001, the museum moving to Saint Louis University to become part of the Museum of Art there. Among other items, the museum contained two oil paintings from 1933 by John A. Mallin, one of Ignatius Loyola and the other, Francis Xavier, which stood at the entrance to the chapel.

== The property ==
The property was largely self-sufficient in its day. The still-standing Rock Building was built by the priests, novices and enslaved workers. Limestone was quarried from the banks of the Missouri River; the walls are 3 feet (0.91 m) thick. Wood came from walnut, logged from the property, and the bricks were fired on site. The seminary had an orchard, a chicken ranch, a cattle barn, wheat fields, vineyards, a butcher shop, a creamery, and a bakery. The former farm property is now owned by Saint Louis County, which leases it to the Missouri Department of Conservation as a conservation area, with hiking trails.
