= Charles de la Croix =

Charles de la Croix (October 28, 1792 – August 20, 1869) was a Flemish Roman Catholic missionary.

== Early life ==
He was born at Sint-Kornelis-Horebeke and was educated at the seminary in Ghent. Because he resisted the bishop forced upon the diocese by Napoleon I, he was imprisoned in the fortress of Wesel with his brother Joseph, who did not survive.

After the fall of Napoleon's empire, de la Croix resumed his studies and was ordained in Ghent by Bishop Dubourg of Louisiana, whom he later followed to the United States along with several other seminarians and some Flemish workmen. In May 1818, he was sent to Perry County, Missouri, to superintend the building of a seminary for the Louisiana diocese as well as begin his missionary duties.

== Missionary life ==
After the arrival of Father Rosati, president of the new seminary, de la Croix went to Florissant, Missouri on December 3, 1818. With the help of the newly arrived colony of the Society of the Sacred Heart, he worked to prepare the way for Pierre-Jean De Smet and the other Jesuit missionaries, who came to Florissant in 1823. He labored among both the Catholic families and the Osage Nation of the plains. When Father Van Quickenborne, S.J., arrived with his eight companions, de la Croix had nearly completed a brick church, started a farm, and opened a missionary field for the work of young Jesuits.

Having been appointed to St. Michael's parish in lower Louisiana, Father de la Croix prepared a convent for the Society of the Sacred Heart, in which they opened a boarding school in 1828. The following year, he returned to Belgium and used funds he had collected there to build a church in the United States, which was completed in 1832. In 1833, he returned to Belgium once more, where he became a canon of the cathedral of Ghent, a position he held until his death 36 years later.
