= Daniel Janssens =

Belgian middle-distance runner

Personal information
- Nationality: Belgian
- Born: 2 December 1925 Petegem-aan-de-Leie, Belgium
- Died: 6 October 2004 (aged 78)

Sport
- Sport: Middle-distance running
- Event: 1500 metres

Daniel Janssens (2 December 1925 – 6 October 2004) was a Belgian middle-distance runner. He competed in the men's 1500 metres at the 1952 Summer Olympics. He died in 2004 and is buried in Gentbrugge.
