= Hazelwood Central High School =

Public school in St. Louis County, Missouri

Location
- 15875 New Halls Ferry Road; Florissant, Missouri 63031; United States; 38°49′50″N 90°18′55″W

Information
- Former name: Hazelwood High School
- Type: Public high school
- Established: 1954; 72 years ago
- School district: Hazelwood School District
- NCES School ID: 291383000622
- Principal: Veronica Macklin
- Teaching staff: 61.67 (on an FTE basis)
- Grades: 9–12
- Enrollment: 1,718 (2024–25)
- Student to teacher ratio: 27.86
- Colors: Black and gold
- Athletics conference: Suburban Conference
- Nickname: Hawks
- Newspaper: Hawk Talk
- Yearbook: Torch
- Website: chs.hazelwoodschools.org

Hazelwood Central High School is a public high school in unincorporated St. Louis County, Missouri, adjacent to the current northeast boundary of Florissant. The school is one of three high schools in Hazelwood School District (HSD), the others being Hazelwood East High School and Hazelwood West High School.

== History ==
The first Hazelwood High School was completed in 1954, located at 1865 Dunn Road in Spanish Lake, an unincorporated community in north St. Louis County. The building is still in use as Hazelwood Opportunity Center. During the early 1960s, as farmland became subdivisions, more students enrolled in the district and a new school was needed to deal with the rapid growth; the second Hazelwood High School was built in 1965 and opened the following year. In its first year, it held 2,515 students who were in the 10th to 12th grades. As the only high school in the district, it quickly became overcrowded, as the baby boomers reached high school-age. In 1972, leading up to the opening of the new high schools, students were partitioned into "B", "C", and "D" schools. In 1974, the "Central" designator appeared in the school's name, to distinguish from the East and West schools, indicating from which portion of the district that students lived. The rapid growth of the district proved too much even for a building of its size, so that year, the school was forced to split the student body into two shifts called "split sessions", with one shift attending from 6:30 a.m. to 12:30 p.m., and one from 1:05 p.m. to 7:05 p.m. Later, overlapping shifts were used with a one-hour stating time change because they could not get all students in nor out of the building at one time. With the opening of two more high schools, Hazelwood West in 1975 and Hazelwood East in 1976, Hazelwood Central returned to a conventional day schedule.

=== 2000–01 school year ===
By the 2000–01 school year, Hazelwood Central's population was once again growing, this time in response to increasing subdivision development within the school district, land that had for decades been open farmland or otherwise vacant. By 2005, the student body population was once again approaching 3,000 students and overcrowding was becoming a problem.

=== 2006–07 school year ===
During the 2006–07 school year, the district announced that it was redrawing the boundaries of the three high schools, effective fall 2008. The net effect of this change on Central was expected to be a reduction in enrollment from nearly 3,000 to approximately 2,500 while increasing the population at Hazelwood West.

== Notable alumni ==
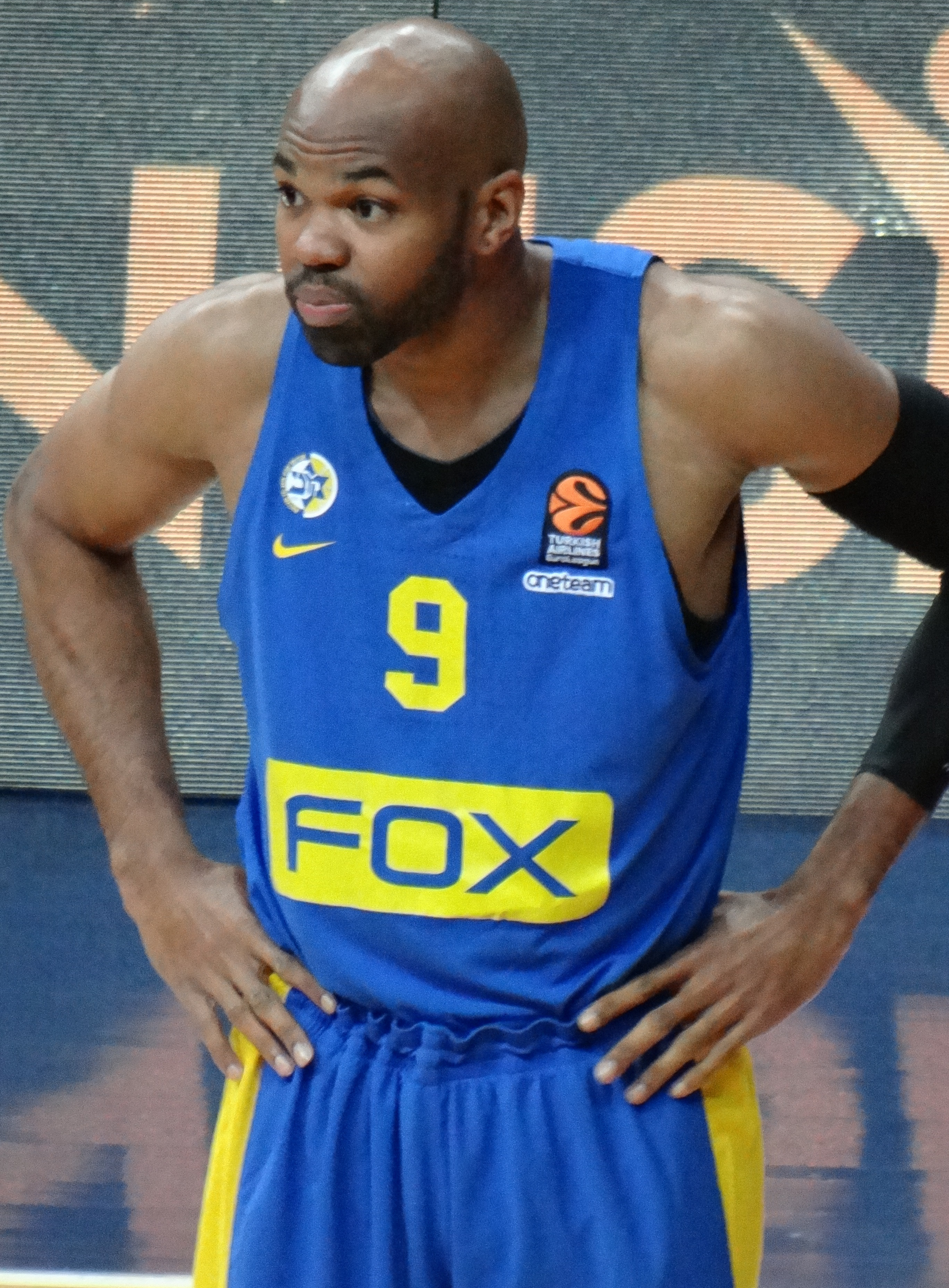
Alex Tyus

- Shane Battelle, MLS player
- Kate Capshaw, actress
- Carey Davis, NFL fullback
- Keith English, Missouri state legislator
- Brian Folkerts, professional football player
- LaVena Johnson, soldier who gained notoriety due to the circumstances her death
- Roderick Johnson, NFL offensive tackle
- Isaac Keys, actor and football player
- Ron Kulpa, MLB umpire
- Jeremy Lucido, photographer/director
- Patti McGuire, Playmate of the Year
- Marvin McNutt, professional football player
- Randy Orton, WWE professional wrestler and 14-time World Champion
- Tim Reynolds, Grammy nominated guitarist
- Xavier Sneed (born 1997), basketball player in the Israeli Basketball Premier League
- Alex Tyus, American-Israeli professional basketball player, also plays for the Israeli national basketball team
