= Jeremy Lucido =

American photographer (born 1977)

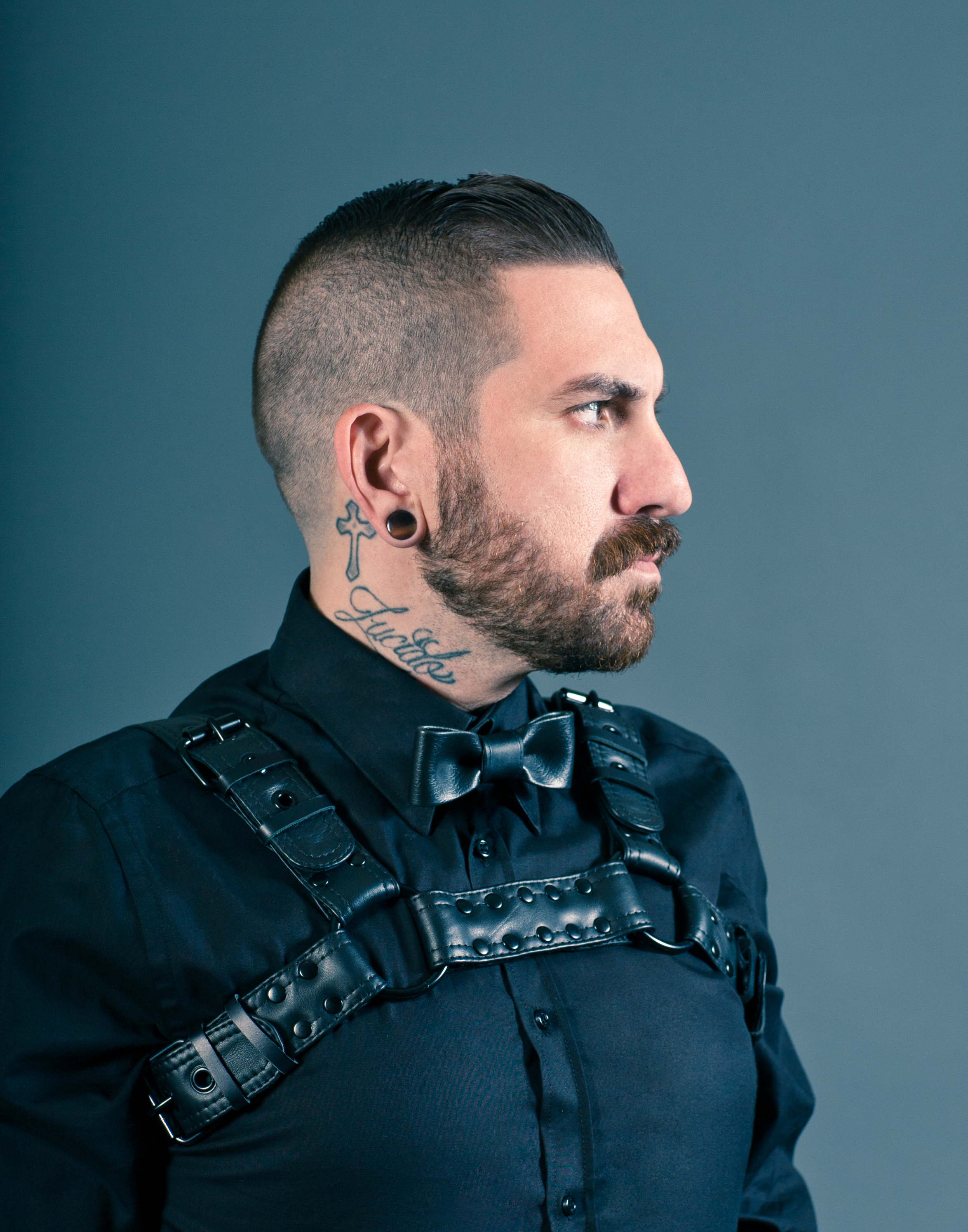
- Portrait of Jeremy Lucido
- Born: Jeremy Joseph Lucido; December 11, 1977 (age 48); Florissant, Missouri, United States
- Known for: Photography
- Spouse: John Constantine AKA The Hound
- Website: JeremyLucido.com

Jeremy Constantine Lucido is a photographer, nightlife promoter, and bar manager based in Los Angeles, California. He is known for his work in the city’s LGBTQ nightlife scene, including his role as general manager of Precinct DTLA.

== Early life ==
Born in a suburb outside of Saint Louis, Missouri, Lucido was encouraged to follow his interest in Art at an early age. However, it wasn't until enrolling in a Yearbook class at Hazelwood Central High School that he discovered his love for photography. In 1999 he moved to Hollywood, California to attend Otis College of Art and Design and receive a BFA in Photography. Shortly after graduation, Lucido opened Jeremy Joe Photography, a portrait studio on Hollywood Boulevard which specialized in headshot photography.

== Career ==
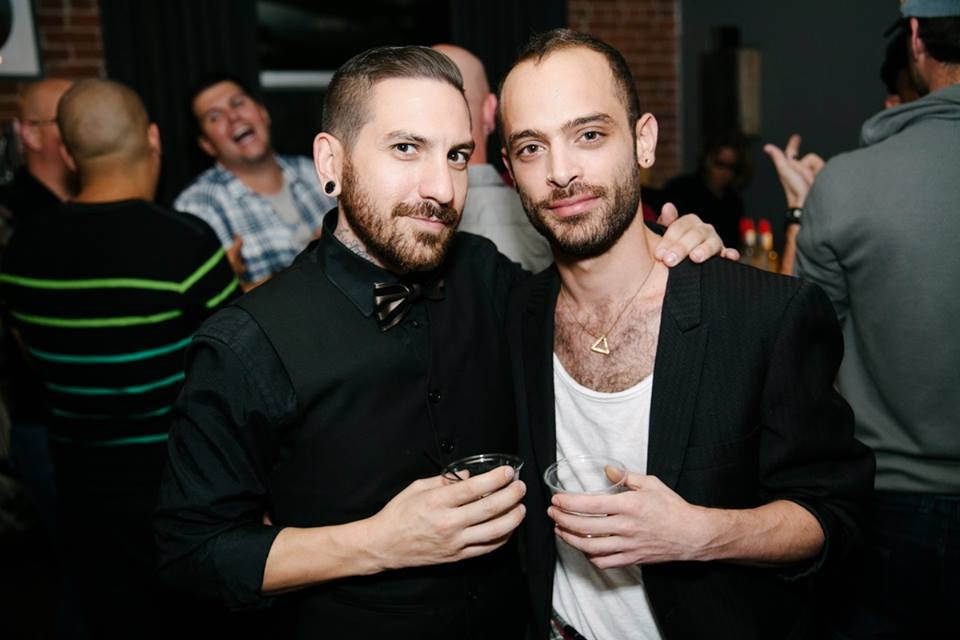
Jeremy Lucido with his husband John Constantine at an AIDS Lifecycle fundraiser in 2014

=== Sex industry ===
Lucido is most known for his work behind the scenes of the sex industry. In 2005 he accepted a job as a video editor at Randy Blue, an online adult production company. He quickly grew in the industry and became the lead photographer as well as Director for several films. Now the Production Manager at Randy Blue he continues his work in the industry.

In 2005 he also launched a blog called "Starrfucker" which helped spark his adult industry career. Jeremy and/or his photography have since been featured in such publications as Frontiers, Cybersocket Magazine, The Advocate, Pisszine, Starrfucker Magazine, and the beef.

=== Starrfucker magazine ===
In 2010 Jeremy rebranded his blog Starrfucker and created his self-published Starrfucker Magazine, a black-and-white print zine featuring his homoerotic photography as well as other art and photography from contributing artists.

According to Nigel Zeff in Flaunt Magazine #130: "The artist/photographer's zine, self-described as "a book of naked men," features photographic pictorials of men in various stages of undress, conjuring up the golden era of physique publications like The Male Figure, Adonis and Physique Pictorial, but with a contemporary edge. There's hair, beards, tattoos, and brawn – it's balls and all, unadulterated masculinity at its peak." In a podcast interview, Jeremy revealed that he based the size of his Starrfucker Magazine to be the same as Bob Mizer's Physique Pictorial.

In 2013 his first coffee table book entitled, Starrfucker was published by Bruno Gmünder Verlag. The book features photography from every past issue of Starrfucker Magazine with a foreword by Venfield 8.

=== Art and photography ===
In 2011 he started Jeremy Lucido Photography where he is a fixture in LGBT nightlife. As the popularity of his portrait work with the rise of Starrfucker Magazine his bookings increased for both commercial and private work. In 2015 Jeremy created an online store for his fine art portrait work.

== Books ==
- Famous Dave's Cookbook (Blurb) (December 14, 2019)
- Raunch (Bruno Gmünder Verlag) (May 1, 2014)
- Turnon: Gear (Bruno Gmünder Verlag) (September 2012)
- Turnon: Tattoos (Bruno Gmünder Verlag) (April 2011)
- Starrfucker (Bruno Gmünder Verlag) (August 2013)

== Magazines ==
- Meat Zine (Issue 18)
- Pisszine Issue No. 6 and Pisszine Issue No. 2
- The Fight Magazine (August 2013)
- Hot Property Unzipped (December 2009)
- The Beef Magazine, Issue No. 4
- Photographs for "Porn Panic!", The Advocate (May 2009)

== Art exhibitions ==
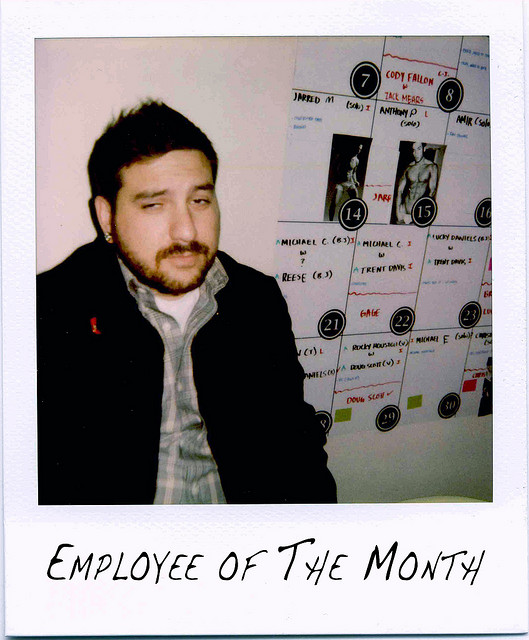
Jeremy Lucido at the Randy Blue production studio in 2009

- Queer Biennial II 2016 (Industry Gallery)
- Boston Elements (The Starrfucker Collection) 2015 (Redline)
- Art Gaysel 2015–2019 (Hotel Gaythering)
- Photo L.A. 2014 (LA Mart)
- FIST PUMP: The Collab Event (Hold Up Art)
- Club HELL
- Niche.LA & Lounge 441 present "Digital World: LA"
- Yard Sale: Misc Photographs by Jeremy Lucido (Tango Blues Gallery)
- Queer Biennial / Miami Basel 2014

== Awards and nominations ==
- Nominated for "Best Director", Grabby Awards (2011) for "Text, Lies and Video" (Randy Blue)
- Nominated for TLAgay Award Twitter-Maniac: Most Prolific in the Biz (2010)
- Nominated for Best Photographer, Weho Awards (2010)
- LA's 11 Most Eligible Bachelors Frontiers Magazine (2009)
