= Daniel A. Lord =

American jesuit priest (1888–1955)

The Reverend Daniel A. Lord SJ

Orders
- Ordination: 1923

Personal details
- Born: April 23, 1888 Chicago, Illinois, U.S.
- Died: January 15, 1955 (aged 66) St. Louis, Missouri, U.S.
- Denomination: Roman Catholic
- Occupation: Jesuit priest; Author; Technical advisor
- Education: St. Stanislaus Seminary; St. Louis University (M.A.)

Daniel Aloysius Lord, SJ (April 23, 1888 – January 15, 1955) was an American Jesuit priest and writer. He wrote 32 books, 15 booklets, and 228 pamphlets, as well as countless articles. Lord also wrote 70 plays, musicals, and pageants. He served as one of the technical consultants on Cecil B. DeMille's 1927 The King of Kings. His most influential work was possibly in drafting the 1930 Production Code for motion pictures.

== Life ==
Born in Chicago, Illinois, April 23, 1888, Daniel Lord attended local Catholic elementary and after a year at De La Salle Institute attending St. Ignatius College Prep. In 1909, he entered the Society of Jesus at St. Stanislaus Seminary in Florissant, Missouri. Upon completion of his novitiate training at St. Stanislaus, he lived in St. Louis, Missouri. He went on to receive an M.A. in Philosophy from St. Louis University, and taught English there from 1917 to 1920. He was ordained a priest in 1923.

In April 1924, Lord addressed 400 delegates of the second annual convention of the St. Louis Archdiocese Council of Catholic Women, where he spoke of the Church as an agency for breaking down provincialism. That same year he gave the Baccalaureate sermon at Webster University in St. Louis. He professed as a member of the Society of Jesus in 1925.

Lord became national director of the Sodality of Our Lady in 1926, also serving as editor of its magazine, The Queen's Work. A loose network of student-based charitable and devotional groups often headquartered at Jesuit educational institutions, it was labeled a dying organization before his involvement, but expanded quickly under Lord's leadership. At the peak in the late 1940s there were 13,000 Sodalities in the United States and Canada at Catholic grade schools, high schools and colleges. Many parishes had both a Women's Sodality and a Men's Sodality. Lord drafted the Sodality theme song, For Christ the King, known to many mid-century American parochial school children. He also wrote, in 1941, the school song for Ursuline College in Louisville, Kentucky.

Lord stepped down from editorship in 1948, but continued to write for the magazine for the remainder of his life, producing more than 90 books, over 300 pamphlets, and countless articles, plays, and songs. "For a 30-year period in the last century, Rev. Daniel Lord, S.J. preached his down-to-earth spirituality by distributing dozens of pamphlets on family life, children, and marriage directly to the people in parish churches."

Lord also staged musical pageants, among which was the "City of Freedom", held in Detroit in July 1951. He also produced a syndicated weekly column, Along the Way, as well as a regular youth feature for Our Sunday Visitor. He also contributed articles on the theater to the Catholic World.

== Hollywood ==
In 1927, Lord served as one of six technical consultants, of various denominations, to Cecil B. DeMille for his silent film King of Kings. Lord alone was listed as Technical Advisor in the film credits. He described his time on the set with DeMille in his autobiography Played by Ear. He observed, "just how far vice may be presented in order to make virtue triumphant is one of the most delicate problems in artistic art."

In 1929, he began work on the Production Code, a project envisioned by censor Martin Quigley, publisher of a Hollywood trade journal, and bolstered by Cardinal George Mundelein of the Archdiocese of Chicago. He saw an opportunity to read morality and decency into mass recreation. He aimed "to tie the Ten Commandments in with the newest and most widespread form of entertainment", aspiring to an ecumenical standard of decency.

In 1930, Lord's draft of the Code was accepted by Will H. Hays and promulgated to the studios with only minor changes, but it lacked an enforcement mechanism, and Lord came to consider it a failure. It was only with the mid-1934 advent of the Production Code Administration headed by Joseph Breen that the Code became the law of Hollywood for more than 25 years.

In the 1930s and 1940s, Lord's writings touched on politics, seeking a Catholic middle ground between socialism and unfettered capitalism. He was a tireless advocate of racial fairness, and frequently engaged issues of economic justice, Dare We Hate Jews was his response to antisemitism, attacking it as incompatible with Catholic teachings.

In 1954, Lord was diagnosed with incurable lung cancer. He died at Saint John's Hospital, St. Louis on January 15, 1955.

== Works (partial) ==
- Father Finn, S.J., the story of his life told by himself for his friends young and old (1929)

=== Books by Lord (Listed chronologically) ===
- A Complete List of Daniel Lord Books
- Armchair Philosophy. New York: America Press, 1918. (An interesting look at Catholic philosophical thought as taught to Jesuit priests at the time.)
- Our Nuns: Their Varied and Vital Service for God and County. New York: Benziger, 1924. (A fascinating look at institutions run by Catholic sisters in Chicago and St. Louis.)
- Religion and Leadership. Milwaukee: Bruce Publishing, 1933. (This popular textbook for Catholic college theology courses was used into the 1950s.)
- My Mother, The Study of an Uneventful Life St. Louis: Queen's Work, 1934. (The famous movie producer John W. Considine Jr. (e.g. Boys Town) considered making a movie of this book.)
- Questions I'm Asked About Marriage St. Louis: Queen's Work, 1938. (Based on questions raised at Lord's frequent lectures, talks, and retreats.)
- Played by Ear, Chicago, Loyola Univ. Press, 1956.

=== Pamphlets ===
- A Complete List of Daniel Lord Pamphlets
- I can read ANYTHING!? All right! - then read THIS!, 1932)
- Confession is a Joy? (1933)
- Fashionable Sin - A Modern Discussion of an Unpopular Subject (1934)
- Pardon My Manners, The Queen's Work / Sodality Movement (1935)

Other pamphlets include: "You can't live that way", The Call to Catholic Action, and Our Part in the Mystical Body.

Another source of Daniel Lord's pamphlets is www.pamphlets.info which can be read online.

=== Novels ===
- Red Arrows in the Night (1943)
