= Petegem-aan-de-Leie =

- Village
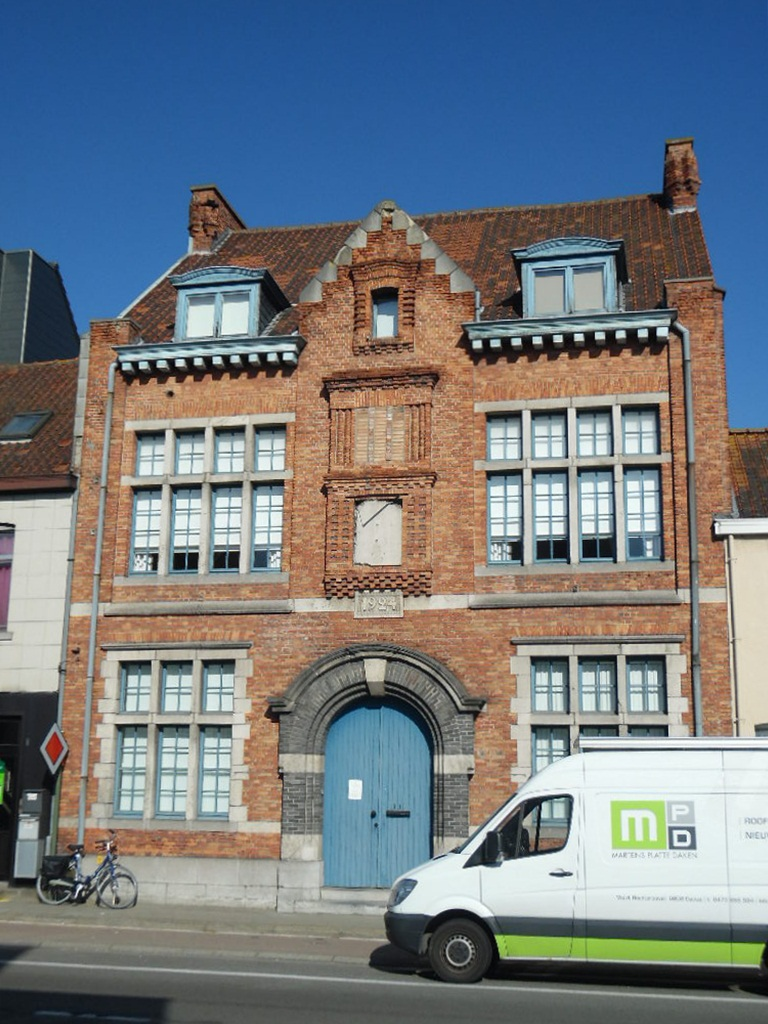
- Former town hall of Petegem

- Location within Belgium
- Coordinates: 50°58′N 3°32′E
- Country: Belgium
- Municipality: Deinze
- Community: Flemish Community
- Region: Flemish Region
- Province: East Flanders

Area
  - Total: 9.54 km^{2} (3.68 sq mi)

Population (2021)
  - Total: 10,232
  - Density: 1,070/km^{2} (2,780/sq mi)
- Postal code: 9800

Petegem-aan-de-Leie is a village in the Belgian province of East Flanders and a borough of Deinze. Petegem-aan-de-Leie is located on the south bank of the river Leie (Lys). The village today forms a single urban core with that of Deinze itself, which is located just across the river.

== History ==
Old records of Petegem go back to the 12th century. Petegem received a city hallmark in 1293 and consisted of two parts. Petegem-Binnen (Petegem-city) was located just south of the bridge over the Leie (Lys) to Deinze. The church was also located here. Petegem-Buiten consisted of several agricultural settlements in the surrounding country. Charles the Bold added Petegem-Binnen to the city of Deinze in 1469. The parish church of Petegem thus came to stand on the territory of Deinze. De Dries, where the roads from Gavere and Oudenaarde converged, served as the center of the village.

The Kortrijk-Ghent road formed an important connecting road that ran from west to east through Petegem, along which various taverns and inns were established. In 1839 the railway line Gent - Kortrijk opened parallel to the stone road. Thereafter, industry developed in Petegem.

Petegem continued to grow and in the mid-1960s a new center district was built south of the old center, where a new town hall was built, a new parish church, a swimming pool and a sports hall. This new town hall was used as a police station after the merger, but then fell into disuse when a central police station was built on the Schipdonk Canal. The building was demolished in 2016.

Until 1963 it was simply called Petegem, from that date the suffix -aan-de-Leie was added to the name to distinguish it from Petegem-aan-de-Schelde in the same province, 15 km south. With the municipal mergers of 1971, Petegem became a sub-municipality of Deinze.

Petegem was partly part of the marquisate of Deinze and partly part of the Drongen Abbey. Hence, its history runs parallel with that of Deinze, of which it has been part since the 1971 merger of municipalities.

== Sights ==
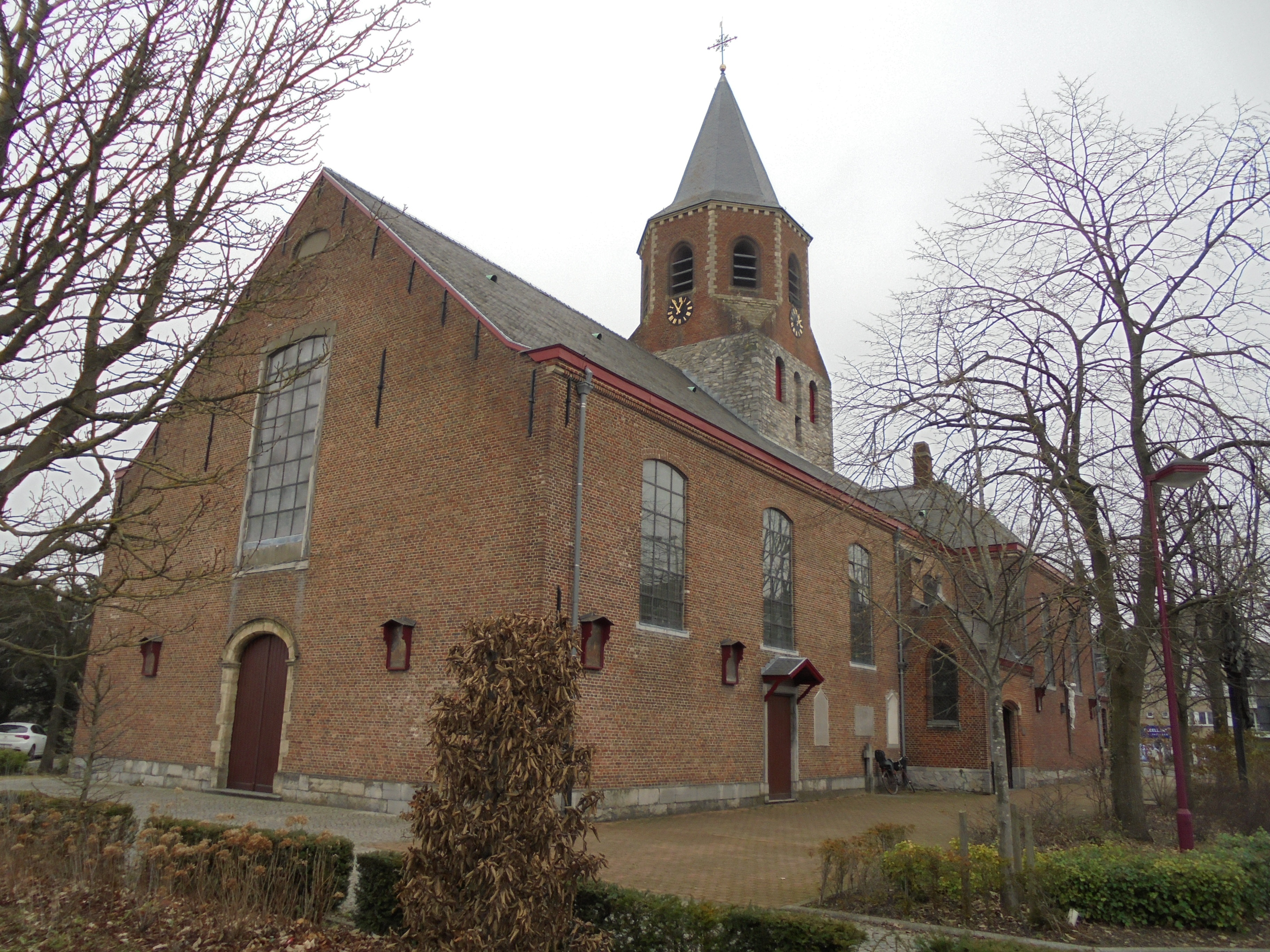
Sint-Martinus-en-Sint-Antonius-Abtkerk

- The St. Paul's Church (Sint-Pauluskerk (Petegem-aan-de-Leie)), the parish church built in 1976 near the new administrative center
- The Sint-Martinus-en-Sint-Antonius-Abtkerk, whose history dates back to 1147. It is the oldest parish church in Petegem. However, it is located on the territory of Deinze, just north of the municipal boundary.
- Het Nieuwgoed, a walled farm, protected as a monument in Belgium, with an imposing 15th-century entrance gate

== Nature & Landscape ==
Petegem-aan-de-Leie is located in Zandig Vlaanderen and in the valley of the Leie (Lys), at an altitude of 10–13 meters. Petegem is highly urbanized and the streams that lead to the Lys are almost all flooded.

== Politics ==
Petegem had its own municipal council and mayor until the municipal merger. Adolf Haerens was the last mayor of the independent municipality before the 1971 merger. The mayors of Petegem were:

...

- 1934-1936 : Julian Filliers
- 1936-1970 : Adolf Haerens

== Infrastructure ==
The municipal swimming pool of Deinze is located in the borough of Petegem.

== Traffic ==
There are important roads to and from Deinze: the N43 from Ghent to Kortrijk and the N35 intersect in Petegem-aan-de-Leie.

The railway line Gent - Kortrijk - Lille runs through Petegem, from which the line Deinze - De Panne (Line 73) branches off here. The station of Deinze is located on the territory of Petegem.

== Sports ==
The district is home to the football club K.F.C. Sparta Petegem. It played in the national championships for several seasons.

== Notable people ==
- Marc De Buck, politician (born 1945)
- Jo De Clercq, singer and politician (born 1947)
- Daniel Janssens, middle-distance runner (born 1925)
- Charles Felix Van Quickenborne, founder of Saint Louis University in St. Louis, Mo., USA (1788–1837)

== Gallery ==
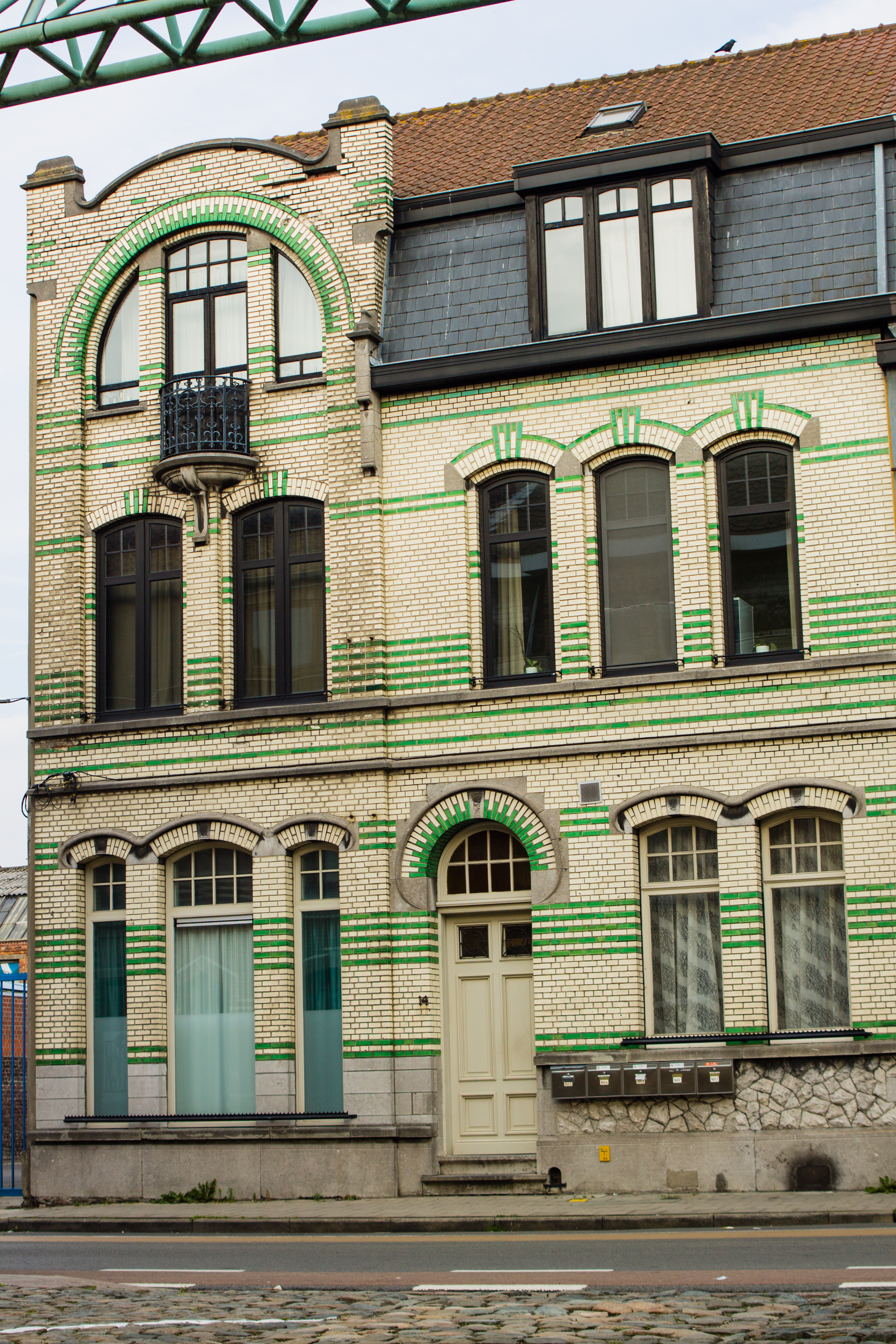
House on Georges Martensstraat

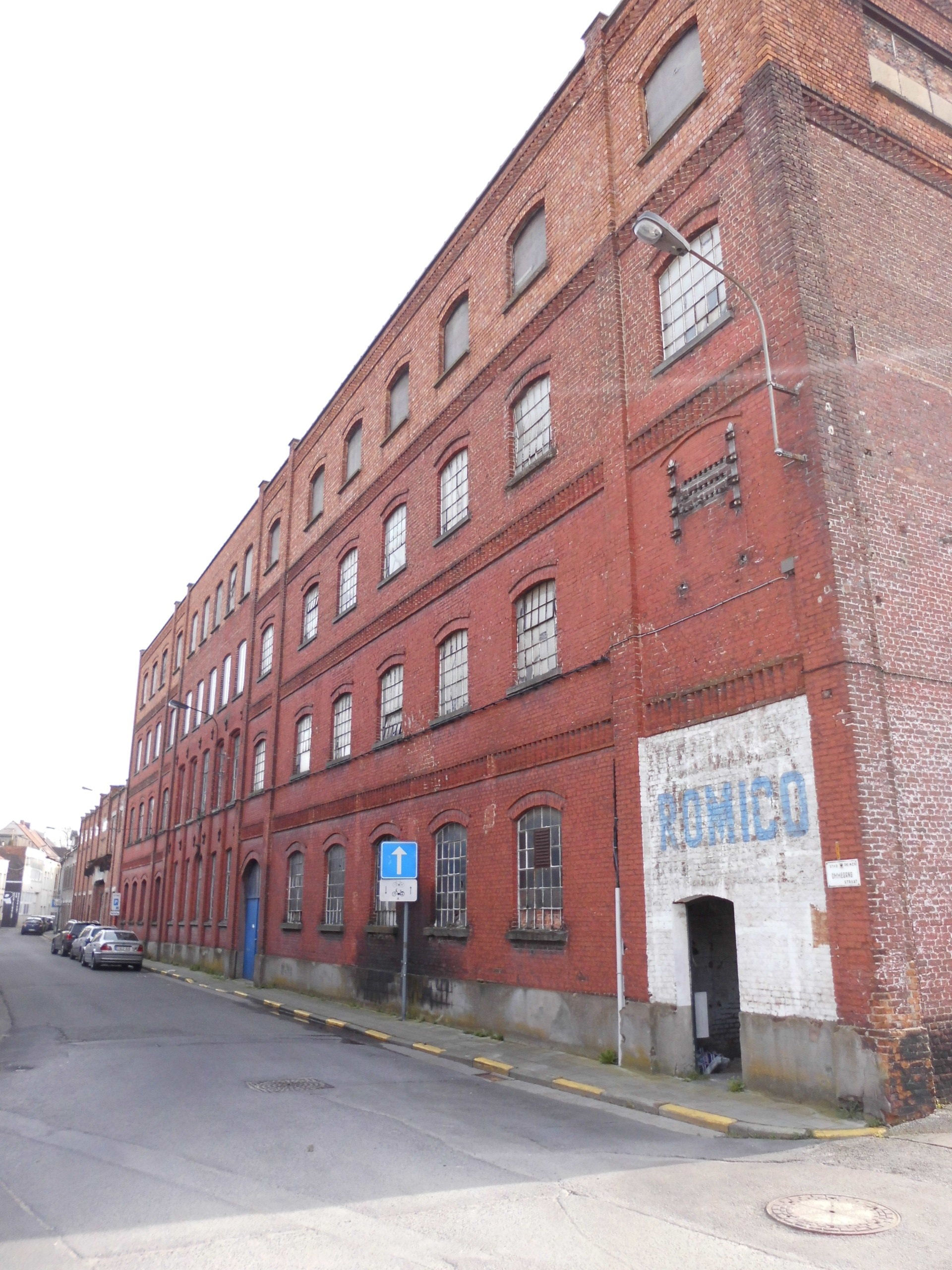
Former Torck factory

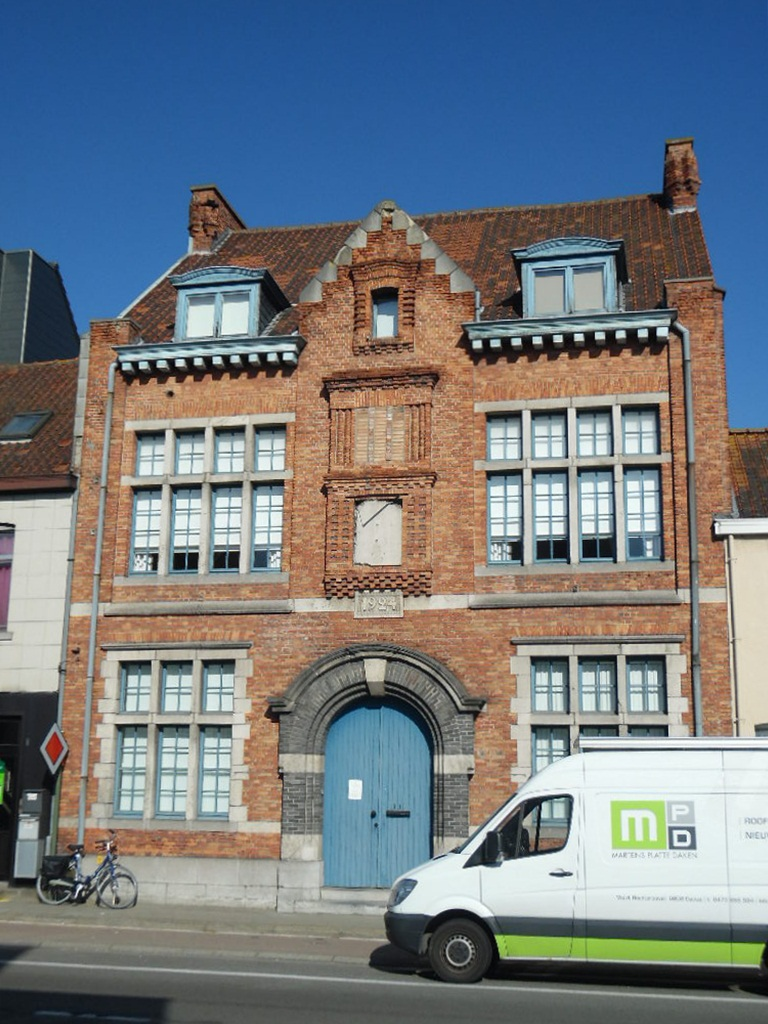
Former town hall

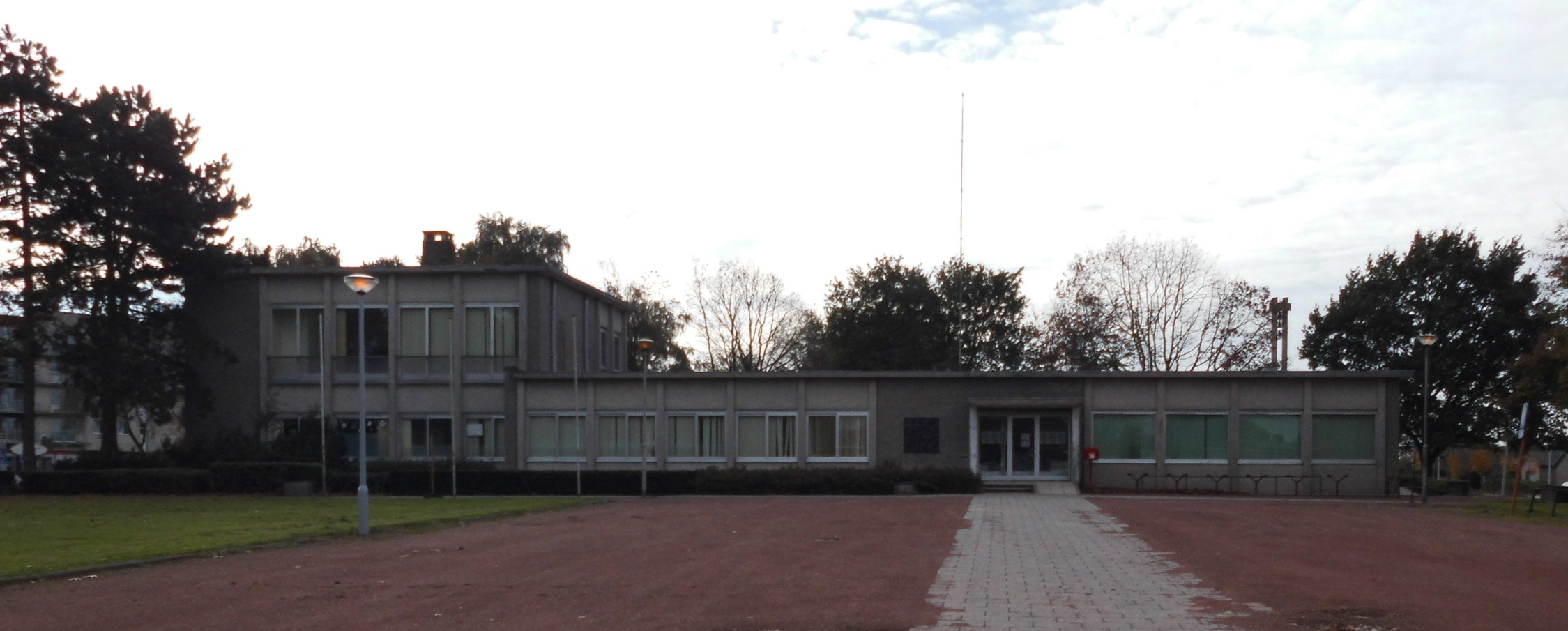
Former town hall (from 1966 to early 1971), then police station and post office

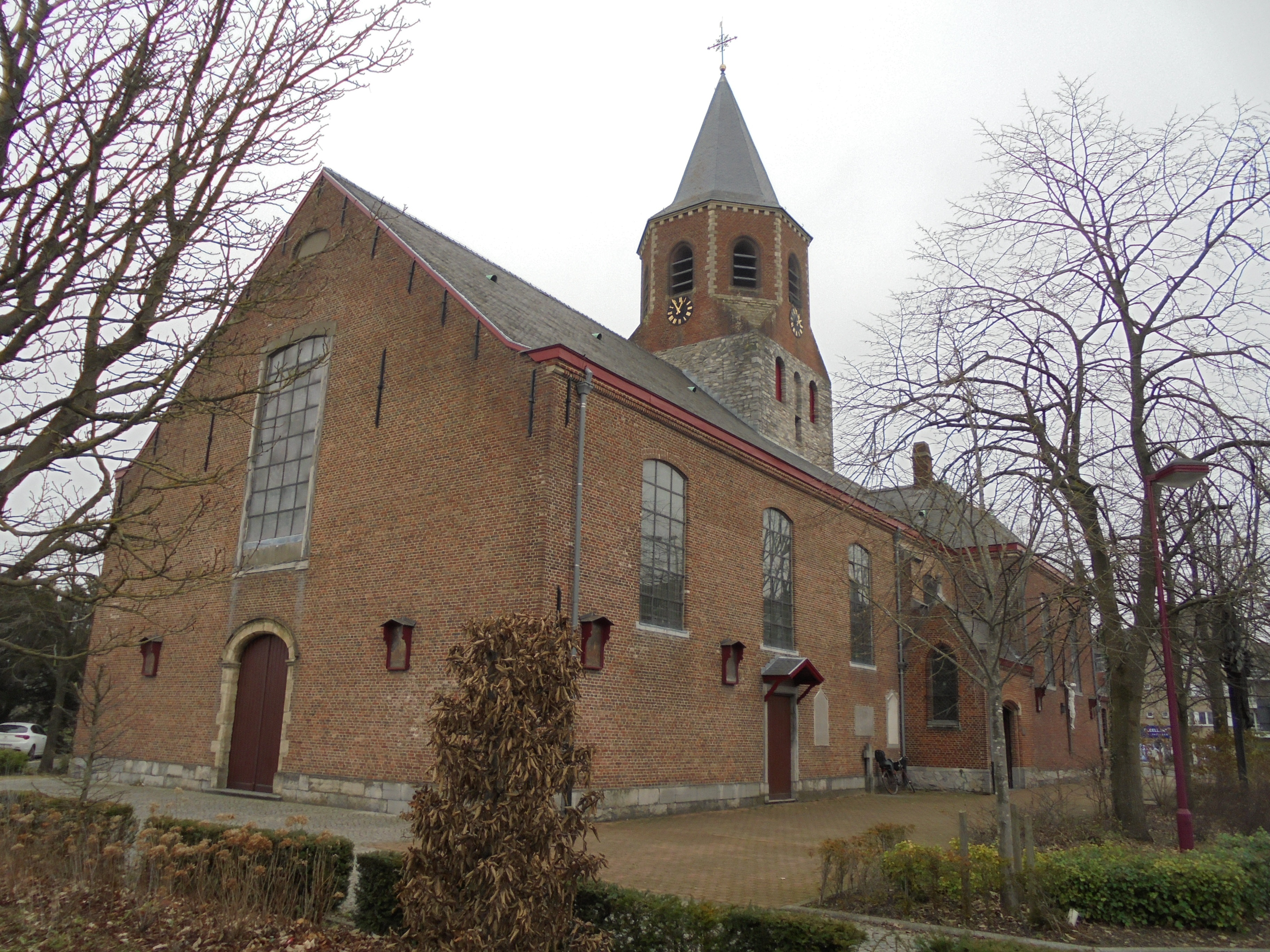
Sint-Martinus-en-Sint-Antonius-Abtkerk

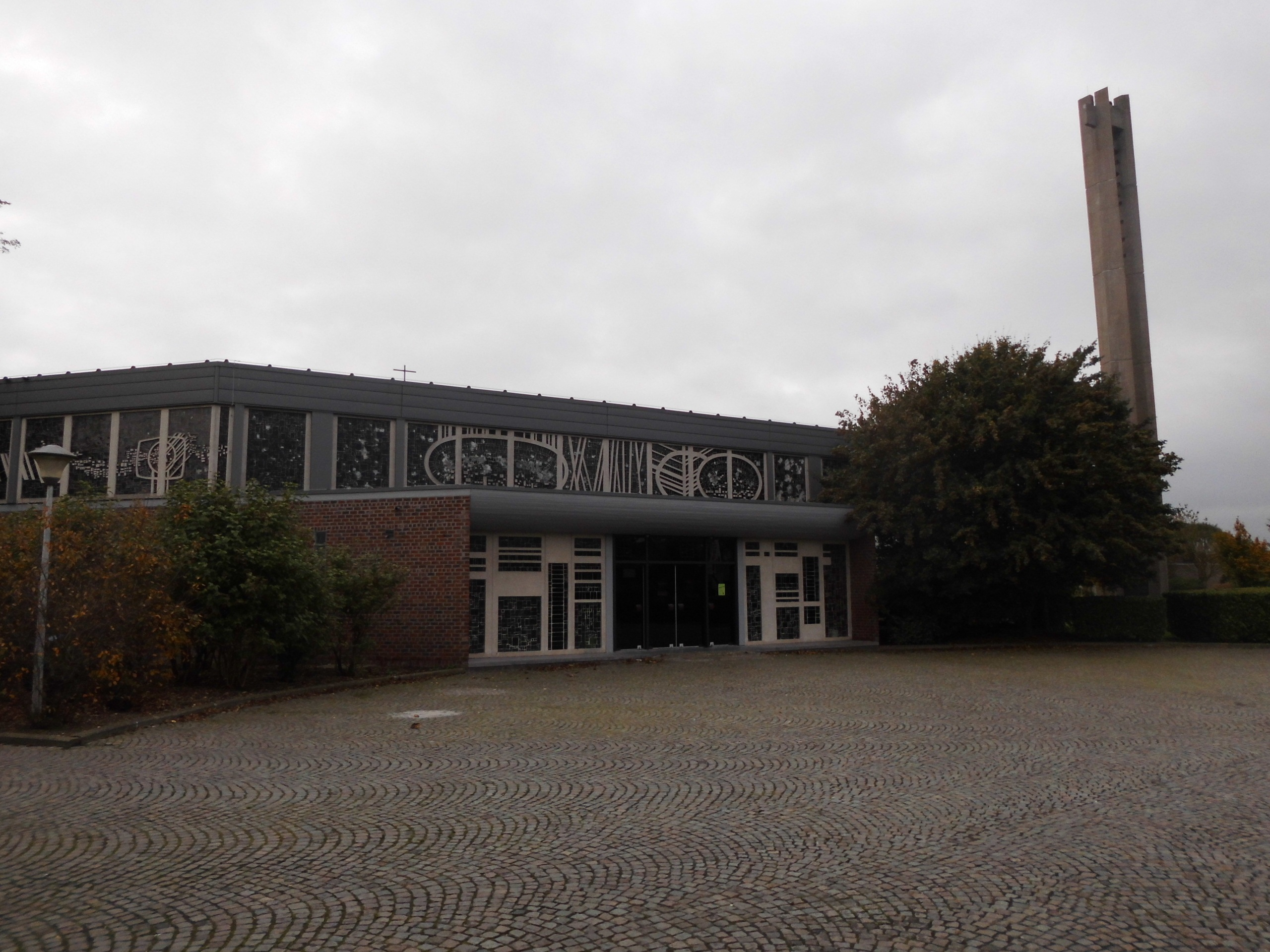
Sint-Pauluskerk (Petegem-aan-de-Leie)
