= Pat O'Connor (politician) =

American politician

Member of the Missouri House of Representatives from the 79th district
- In office 1992–2002

Personal details
- Born: December 17, 1960 (age 65) St. Louis, Missouri
- Party: Missouri Democratic Party
- Education: University of Missouri–St. Louis
- Committees: Motor Vehicle and Traffic Regulations (chair), Labor, Professional Registration and Licensing

Pat O'Connor (born December 17, 1960, in St. Louis) is an American politician who served in the Missouri House of Representatives from 1992 to 2002. He was elected as a Democrat, and left office due to term limits. In his final term, O'Connor was the chair of the Motor Vehicle and Traffic Regulations Committee and a member of the Labor Committee and the Professional Registration and Licensing Committee.

O'Connor attended Hazelwood West High School and University of Missouri–St. Louis.
