= Hazelwood East High School =

Public school in St. Louis County, Missouri

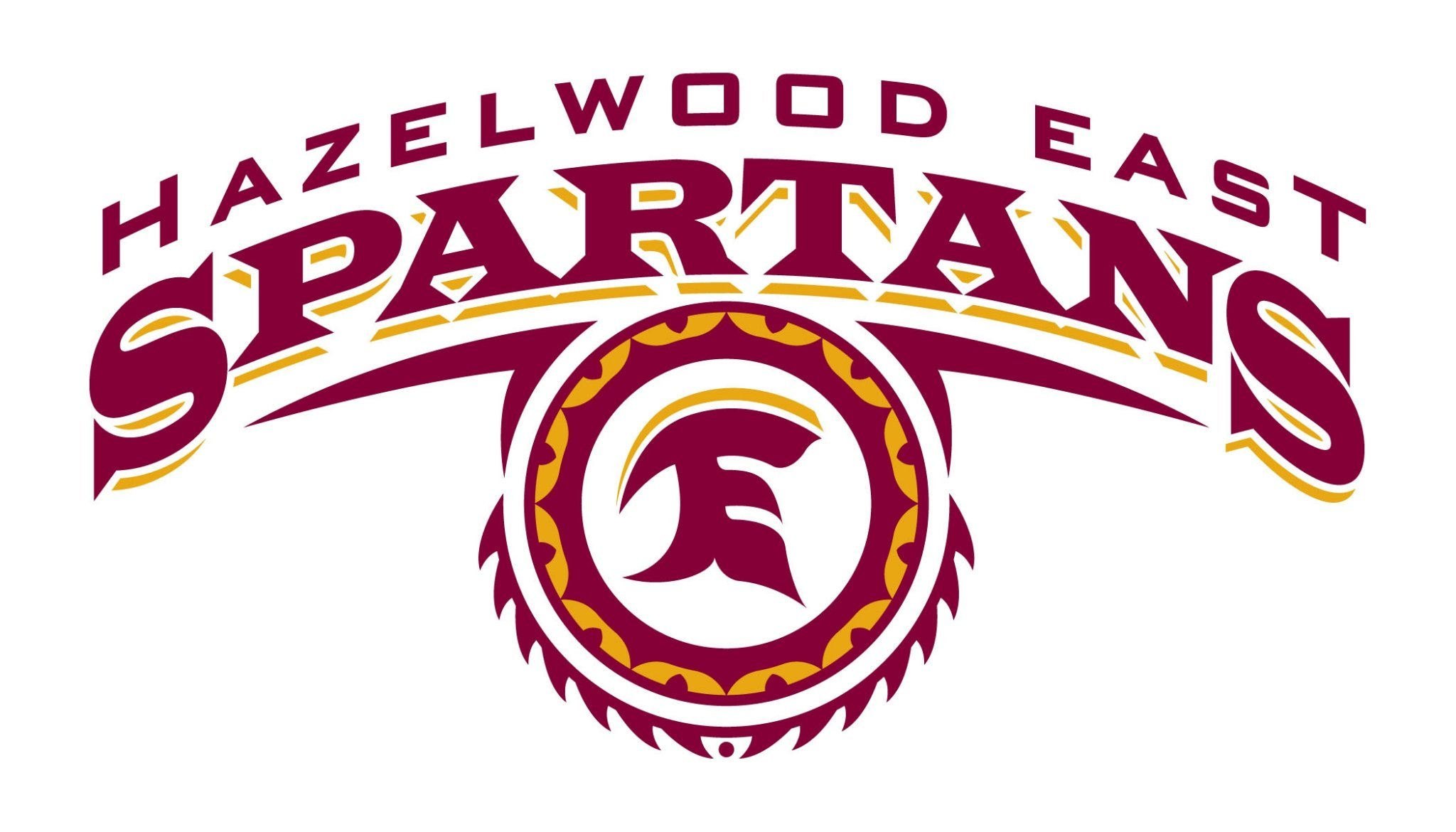

Location
- 11300 Dunn Road; Spanish Lake, Missouri 63138; United States; 38°46′35″N 90°14′7.6″W

Information
- Type: Public high school
- Established: 1974; 52 years ago
- School district: Hazelwood School District
- NCES School ID: 291383002696
- Interim principal: Elizabeth Havey
- Teaching staff: 50.07 (FTE) (on an FTE basis)
- Grades: 9–12 (Note: East Middle 8th Grade Center is a separate school on campus.)
- Enrollment: 1,253 (2023–24)
- Student to teacher ratio: 25.02
- Colors: Maroon and gold
- Athletics conference: Suburban Conference
- Nickname: Spartans
- Rival: Hazelwood West, Hazelwood Central
- Newspaper: The Spartan Spectrum
- Yearbook: Pegasus
- Website: ehs.hazelwoodschools.org

Hazelwood East High School is a public high school in Spanish Lake, Missouri. It is one of three high schools in Hazelwood School District in St. Louis County, Missouri, alongside Hazelwood Central and Hazelwood West.

== History ==
Hazelwood East was established in 1974 with the classes of 1975 and 1976 attending split-class sessions in the existing Hazelwood High School building. Hazelwood East and Hazelwood West students attended classes in the morning, and Hazelwood Central students attended in the afternoon. Hazelwood East's new facility opened to students in the fall of 1976.

The school integrated an "open-space" classroom concept. Because of this, many of the classrooms did not have four walls separating them from other classes. In the fall of 2005, the school's building underwent many renovations including 20 additional classrooms, additional windows and lockers, a science and math wing, and fully enclosed classrooms. After the 2007 redistricting plan went into effect, the student population dropped significantly, making the school less over-crowded as the students were partially re-distributed between the three high schools. East High has also received substantial renovations during the 2013 and 2014 school years, receiving an additional practice gymnasium, wheel-chair accessibility to all floors, an expanded athletic wing, renovations to the 2nd and 3rd floors, and a new library, among other updates. Beginning with the 2017–18 school year, East High School began housing 8th graders under the new "East Middle School: 8th Grade Academy" after the original East Middle School was dissolved/absorbed from its original site to make way for the district's new Hazelwood Opportunity Center (Alternative School). The 6th and 7th graders of East Middle were redistributed to Southeast Middle School and other surrounding district middle schools, while the 8th graders have the option to apply to the 8th Grade Academy or remain at their middle school. On March 8, 2024, a 16-year-old female student was hospitalized with a severe head injury after a street brawl took place north of the school.

=== Hazelwood School District v. Kuhlmeier ===
The landmark Supreme Court case Hazelwood School District v. Kuhlmeier originated at Hazelwood East in 1988 and involved journalism students who were members of The Spectrum staff. Ultimately, the case was decided in a 5–3 decision in favor of the Hazelwood School District, with the Court ruling that the administrator's censorship of newspaper content did not violate the First Amendment rights of the students.

== Notable alumni ==
- Wesley Bell, prosecutor for St. Louis County
- Chris Brooks, American football wide receiver
- DeMontie Cross, American football coach
- Bryan J. Fletcher, American football tight end
- Jamar Fletcher, American football cornerback
- Jason Fletcher, sports agent
- Terrell Fletcher, American football running back
- Michael Gentry, creator of Anchorhead
- Charles Johnson, mixed martial artist
- Christian Kirksey, American football linebacker
- Gerald Nichols, American football defensive lineman
- Chantelle Nickson-Clark, Missouri state legislator
- Al Olmsted, professional baseball player
- Walt Powell, American football wide receiver/punt returner
- Lance Robertson (DJ Lance Rock), musician, disc jockey, actor
- Kerry Robinson, professional baseball player
- Brian Schaefering, American football defensive end
- Scott Starks, American football cornerback
- Bernard Whittington, American football defensive end
- Brandon Williams, American football wide receiver
