= Florissant, Missouri =

City in St. Louis County, Missouri, United States

- City
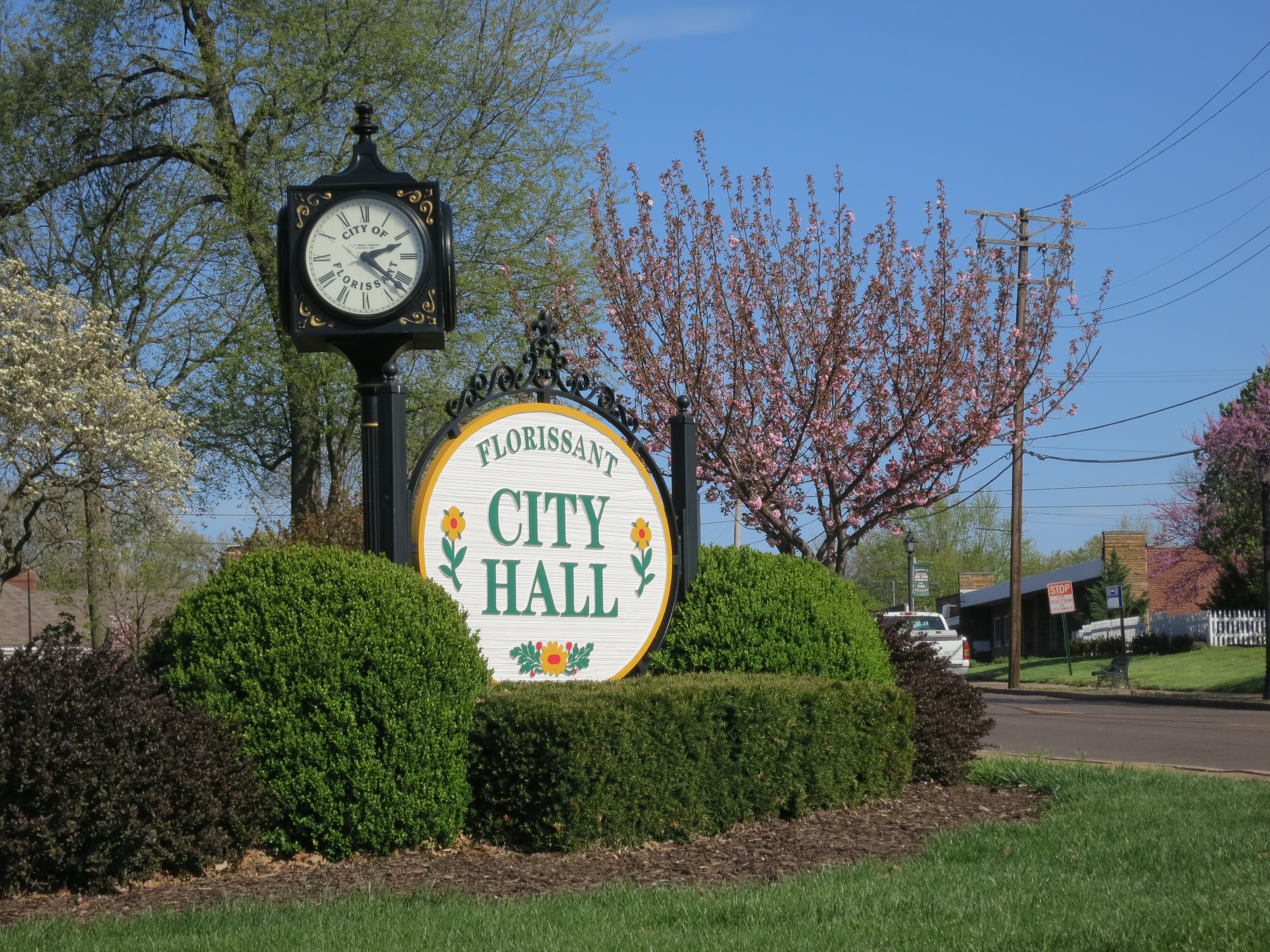
- Florissant City Hall sign, April 2013

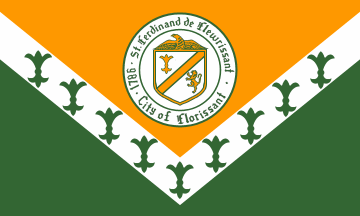
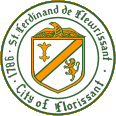
- Flag Seal

- Location of Florissant, Missouri
- Coordinates: 38°47′59″N 90°19′37″W
- Country: United States
- State: Missouri
- County: St. Louis
- Founded: 1785

Government
  - Mayor: Tim Lowery
  - City council: List: Andrew Harris (Ward 1); Paul Manganelli (Ward 2); Joe Eagan (Ward 3); Jeff Caputa (Ward 4); Keith Schildroth (Ward 5); Patrick Mulcahy (Ward 6); Jackie Pagano (Ward 7); Tanya Parson (Ward 8); Tommy Siam (Ward 9)

Area
  - Total: 12.86 sq mi (33.31 km^{2})
  - Land: 12.55 sq mi (32.51 km^{2})
  - Water: 0.31 sq mi (0.80 km^{2})
- Elevation: 528 ft (161 m)

Population (2020)
  - Total: 52,533
  - Density: 4,185/sq mi (1,616/km^{2})
- Time zone: UTC-6 (Central (CST))
  - Summer (DST): UTC-5 (CDT)
- ZIP Codes: 63031, 63032, 63033, 63034
- Area code: 314
- FIPS code: 29-24778
- GNIS feature ID: 2394777
- Website: www.florissantmo.com

Florissant (/ˈflɒrɪsənt/ FLORR-iss-ənt or /ˈfloʊrɪsənt/ FLOH-riss-ənt) is a city in St. Louis County, Missouri, United States, within Greater St. Louis. It is a second-ring northern suburb of St. Louis. Based on the 2020 United States census, the city had a total population of 52,533. It is the largest city in St. Louis County.

== History ==
The exact date the first settlers went to the Valley of Florissant is unknown, but it is one of the oldest settlements in Missouri. Some historians believe it was settled about the same time as St. Louis. The first civilian government was formed in 1786. Spanish archives in Havana reveal 40 people and seven plantations were in Florissant at the time of the 1787 census. The village, called "Fleurissant", meaning "Blooming" in French, by its French settlers and "St. Ferdinand" by its Spanish rulers, was a typical French village with its commons and common fields. Originally a separate town, and now an inner suburb of St. Louis, the community was centered on (and frequently called after) the parish of St. Ferdinand. The center of the parish, the Old St. Ferdinand Shrine, survives and is listed on the National Register of Historic Places.

Around 1809, the Cold Water Cemetery had the first burial; since 2004, it has been listed in the National Register of Historic Places for its social history.

As late as 1889, the town was predominantly French-speaking (while the southern portion of the metropolis was populated by German speakers). The first train line to the area was constructed in 1878—an extension of the line which went from St. Louis City to Normandy. The last train to Florissant ran on November 14, 1931.

Following World War II, Florissant went from a small village community to a large suburban center, as developers such as Alfred H. Mayer Co. began building subdivisions on what was formerly farmland and empty acreage. Around 18,000 houses were built between 1947 and 1980, and the population swelled to its peak of about 76,000 in the mid-1970s, making it the largest city in St. Louis County.

James J. Eagan was the first mayor of Florissant after a charter amendment created the position. He ultimately served 37 years from 1963 until his death on November 2, 2000, being re-elected into office nine times, and became one of the longest-serving mayors of any city in the United States. In his final year, he was awarded the title of Best Politician in St. Louis by the Riverfront Times. The civic center off Parker Road is named the James J. Eagan Community Center in his memory.

In 2012, Florissant was ranked 76 in Money magazine's top-100 list of Best Places to Live – America's Best Small Cities. In 2014, Florissant ranked as the #1 Best Small City to Retire To in America and the second-safest city in Missouri.

Florissant Old Town Historic District is a locally designated historic preservation planning district, created by local ordinance in 1969. Within that, the heart of Old Town Florissant is listed on the National Register of Historic Places as the St. Ferdinand Central Historic District. The boundaries of the district are roughly rue St. Francois, rue St. Ferdinand, and rue St. Denis, and Lafayette Street. The City of St. Ferdinand Multiple Resource Area (MRA), located in the oldest section of the present city of Florissant, encompasses approximately 156 city blocks and encloses the approximate area of the City of St. Ferdinand, as Florissant was known from 1857 to 1939. This MRA comprises 124 historically significant properties ranging in date from 1790 to 1940. The historic Old St. Ferdinand Shrine is located on the western end of Old Town. The Shrine and Historic Site consists of four historic buildings on their original locations: the 1819 convent, 1821 church, 1840 rectory, and 1888 schoolhouse. It is listed individually on the National Register of Historic Places and is a U.S. Historic District.

Historic Florissant, the local historical society, operates out of the preserved Gittemeier House.

== Geography ==
According to the United States Census Bureau, the city has a total area of 12.87 square miles (33.33 km^{2}), of which 12.56 square miles (32.53 km^{2}) are land and 0.31 square mile (0.80 km^{2}) is covered by water. The majority of Florissant is located north of I-270 in St Louis County Missouri. Florissant’s northwestern boundary is on the Missouri River, where Florissant maintains the 108-acre Sunset Park. Florissant’s southern boundary is with Hazelwood, Missouri and Ferguson, Missouri, the eastern boundary is with Black Jack, Missouri, and the northern boundary is with Old Jamestown, Missouri.

== Demographics ==
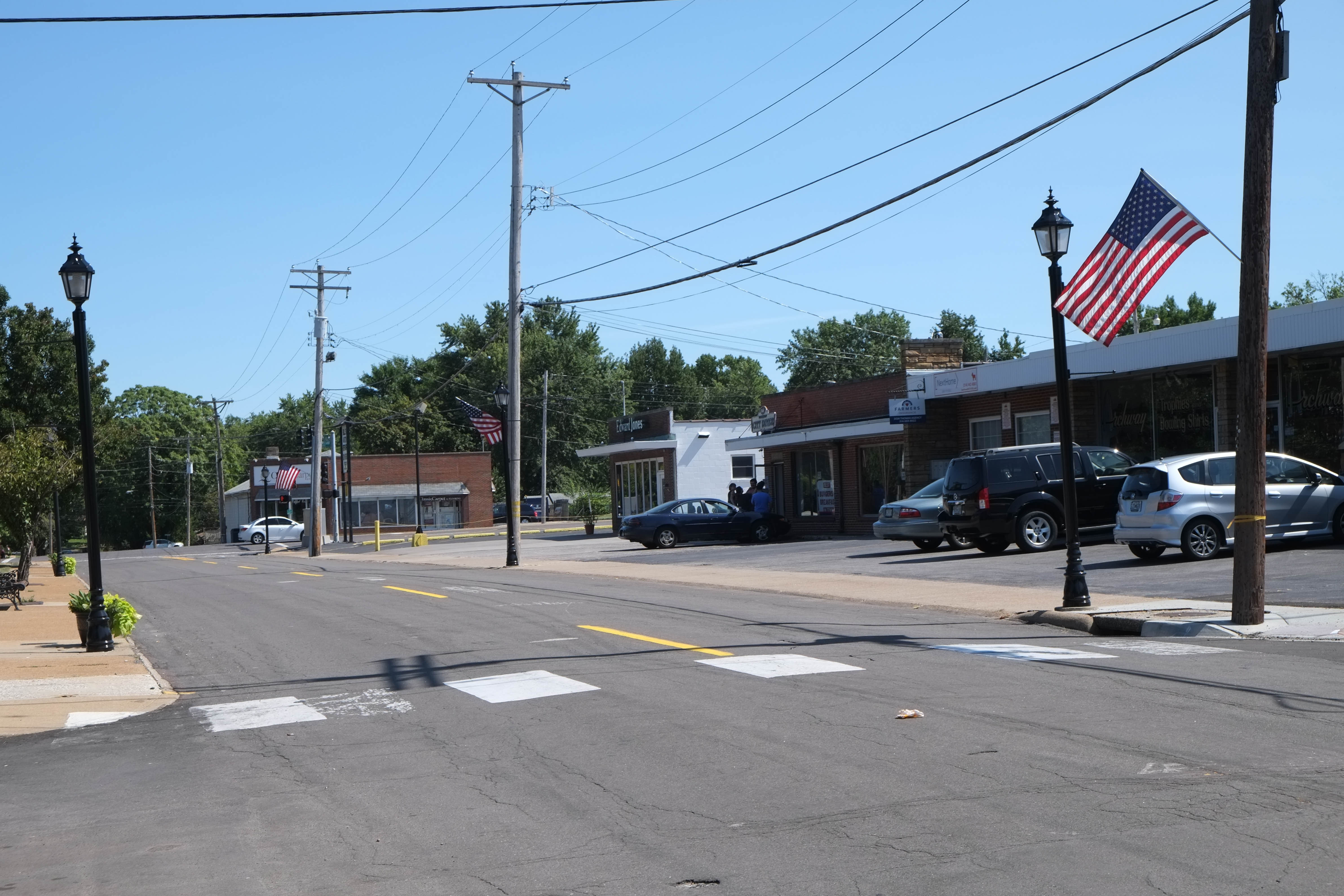
View down a street in Florissant, April 2013

Historical population
Census	Pop.	Note	%±
1880	817		—
1890	769		−5.9%
1900	752		−2.2%
1910	765		1.7%
1920	682		−10.8%
1930	1,039		52.3%
1940	1,369		31.8%
1950	3,737		173.0%
1960	38,166		921.3%
1970	65,908		72.7%
1980	55,372		−16.0%
1990	51,206		−7.5%
2000	50,497		−1.4%
2010	52,158		3.3%
2020	52,533		0.7%
2020

=== Racial and ethnic composition ===
Florissant city, Missouri – Racial and ethnic composition Note: the US Census treats Hispanic/Latino as an ethnic category. This table excludes Latinos from the racial categories and assigns them to a separate category. Hispanics/Latinos may be of any race.
Race / Ethnicity (NH = Non-Hispanic)	Pop 2000	Pop 2010	Pop 2020	% 2000	% 2010	% 2020
White alone (NH)	42,807	35,559	23,980	84.77%	68.18%	45.65%
Black or African American alone (NH)	5,775	13,889	23,377	11.44%	26.63%	44.50%
Native American or Alaska Native alone (NH)	90	109	94	0.18%	0.21%	0.18%
Asian alone (NH)	302	394	519	0.60%	0.76%	0.99%
Native Hawaiian or Pacific Islander alone (NH)	15	19	12	0.03%	0.04%	0.02%
Other race alone (NH)	79	81	347	0.16%	0.16%	0.66%
Mixed race or Multiracial (NH)	676	1,078	2,642	1.34%	2.07%	5.03%
Hispanic or Latino (any race)	753	1,029	1,562	1.49%	1.97%	2.97%
Total	50,497	52,158	52,533	100.00%	100.00%	100.00%

=== 2020 census ===
As of the 2020 census, Florissant had a population of 52,533, 21,185 households, and 12,336 families. The median age was 37.8 years. 23.9% of residents were under the age of 18 and 16.2% were 65 years of age or older. For every 100 females there were 86.1 males, and for every 100 females age 18 and over there were 80.6 males age 18 and over.

100.0% of residents lived in urban areas, while 0.0% lived in rural areas.

There were 22,710 housing units, of which 6.7% were vacant. The homeowner vacancy rate was 1.8% and the rental vacancy rate was 9.6%.

There were 21,185 households in Florissant, of which 30.2% had children under the age of 18 living with them. Of all households, 34.4% were married-couple households, 19.1% were households with a male householder and no spouse or partner present, and 39.3% were households with a female householder and no spouse or partner present. About 31.9% of all households were made up of individuals and 12.8% had someone living alone who was 65 years of age or older.

Racial composition as of the 2020 census
Race	Number	Percent
White	24,345	46.3%
Black or African American	23,529	44.8%
American Indian and Alaska Native	125	0.2%
Asian	530	1.0%
Native Hawaiian and Other Pacific Islander	14	0.0%
Some other race	790	1.5%
Two or more races	3,200	6.1%
Hispanic or Latino (of any race)	1,562	3.0%

=== 2010 census ===
At the 2010 census, there were 52,158 people, 21,247 households and 13,800 families living in the city. The population density was 4,152.7 inhabitants per square mile (1,603.4/km^{2}). There were 22,632 housing units at an average density of 1,801.9 per square mile (695.7/km^{2}). The racial makeup of the city was 58.3% White, 36.8% African American, 0.2% Native American, 0.8% Asian, 0.6% from other races, and 2.3% from two or more races. Hispanic or Latino people of any race were 2.0% of the population.

There were 21,247 households, of which 32.3% had children under the age of 18 living with them, 42.4% were married couples living together, 17.5% had a female householder with no husband present, 5.1% had a male householder with no wife present, and 35.0% were non-families. 29.9% of all households were made up of individuals, and 12.2% had someone living alone who was 65 years of age or older. The average household size was 2.42 and the average family size was 3.00.

The median age in the city was 38 years. 23.9% of residents were under the age of 18; 8.6% were between the ages of 18 and 24; 26.2% were from 25 to 44; 25.8% were from 45 to 64; and 15.5% were 65 years of age or older. The gender makeup of the city was 46.8% male and 53.2% female.

=== 2000 census ===
At the 2000 census, there were 50,497 people, 20,399 households and 13,687 families living in the city. The population density was 4,442.4 inhabitants per square mile (1,715.2/km^{2}). There were 21,027 housing units at an average density of 1,849.8 per square mile (714.2/km^{2}). The racial makeup of the city was 86.66% White, 10.51% African American, 0.20% Native American, 0.61% Asian, 0.03% Pacific Islander, 0.52% from other races, and 1.48% from two or more races. Hispanic or Latino people of any race were 1.49% of the population.

There were 20,399 households, of which 30.7% had children under the age of 18 living with them, 49.8% were married couples living together, 13.2% had a female householder with no husband present, and 32.9% were non-families. 28.8% of all households were made up of individuals, and 12.3% had someone living alone who was 65 years of age or older. The average household size was 2.44 and the average family size was 3.01.

24.7% of the population were under the age of 18, 8.2% from 18 to 24, 29.9% from 25 to 44, 20.0% from 45 to 64, and 17.1% who were 65 years of age or older. The median age was 37 years. For every 100 females, there were 89.5 males. For every 100 females age 18 and over, there were 84.1 males.

The median household income was $44,462 and the median family income was $52,195. Males had a median income of $37,434 compared with $27,247 for females. The per capita income for the city was $20,622. About 2.7% of families and 4.0% of the population were below the poverty line, including 4.5% of those under age 18 and 3.7% of those age 65 or over.

=== Income ===
The 2016–2020 5-year American Community Survey estimates show that the median household income was $58,769 (with a margin of error of +/- $4,467) and the median family income was $73,794 (+/- $3,536). Males had a median income of $36,440 (+/- $2,203) versus $33,166 (+/- $2,612) for females. The median income for those above 16 years old was $34,998 (+/- $1,688). Approximately, 7.9% of families and 10.2% of the population were below the poverty line, including 17.2% of those under the age of 18 and 5.2% of those ages 65 or over.

== Education ==
=== Public ===
Florissant is covered by the Hazelwood and Ferguson-Florissant public school districts. McCluer North High School and McCluer High School of the Ferguson-Florissant School District, and North Technical High School are high schools in Florissant. Hazelwood Northwest Middle School and several elementary schools are also within the municipal limits.

The headquarters of the Hazelwood school district has a Florissant address, but is not in that city nor any other city.

=== Private ===
North County Christian School is a pre-school to grade 12 Christian school that is theologically associated with the Church of the Nazarene.

There are several kindergarten through 8th-grade parochial schools in Florissant. These include Atonement Lutheran School, Sacred Heart, St. Ferdinand, and Saint Norbert.

=== Higher education ===
Florissant has a theological college, an extension campus, and a barber college. Saint Louis Christian College is a private, four-year, undergraduate institution that is theologically and ecclesiastically associated with the Christian Churches and Churches of Christ. Lindenwood University has its offsite North County Campus located in the former Our Lady of Fatima School. Missouri School of Barbering and Hairstyling-St Louis is also located in Florissant.

St. Louis Community College–Florissant Valley and University of Missouri–St. Louis are located in close proximity to the city.

=== Public libraries ===
St. Louis County Library operates the Florissant Valley Branch in Florissant.

== Missouri German and Missouri French architecture ==
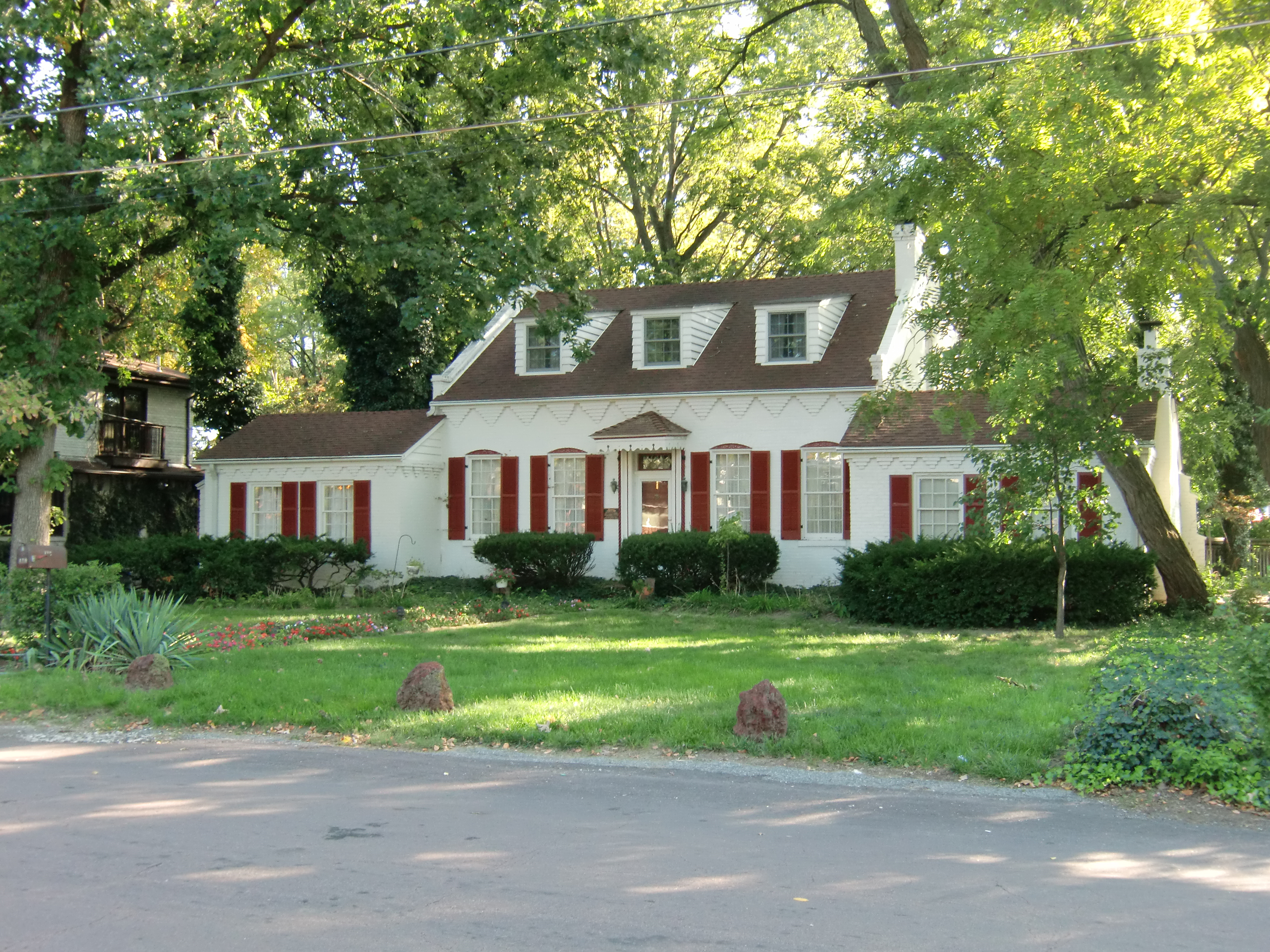
Kuehn House

Florissant is home of many examples of Missouri German architecture, mostly in brick commercial and institutional buildings,

The finest example in the area is the Kuehn House, which has a "pronounced, toothed corbel table on its primary facade"; other notable examples are the Tebeau House and the Withington House. Each of these is individually listed on the National Register of Historic Places. Several more examples are in the National Register-listed St. Ferdinand Central Historic District:

- Abel-Griese House and Store,
- Weithaupt Store and Residence,
- Sacred Heart Convent (1904), 751 Jefferson, a brick building also with Gothic Revival detailing,
- Herz Jesu Schule (1889), 751 Jefferson, which mirrors the style of the Sacred Heart Convent, and
- Griese House (1858), 700 Jefferson, an apartment building.

It is also home to numerous Missouri French architecture examples, mostly wood frame residences. Examples include:

- Moynihan House (Florissant, Missouri)
- Hubecky House
- Meyer House (Florissant, Missouri)

== Health care ==
Florissant is home to Northwest HealthCare, an outpatient subsidiary of Christian Hospital. Services include: emergency department, sleep lab, bone density testing, mammography, ultrasound and MRI. A satellite facility of the Alvin J. Siteman Cancer Center on the campus opened in late 2019.

== Notable people ==
- Kate Capshaw, actress, wife of Steven Spielberg
- Shane Battelle, soccer player
- Gwen Berry, athlete awarded gold for the hammer event, Pan American Games 2019
- Michael Brown, 18-year-old shot and killed by a Missouri police officer in 2014
- Cedric the Entertainer, comedian and actor
- Chingy, rapper
- Bob Christian, NFL running back
- Pierre-Jean De Smet, Catholic priest and missionary
- Michael H. Decker, Director of Marine Corps Intelligence
- Rose Philippine Duchesne, Catholic nun and missionary
- Dennis Edwards, singer (The Contours, The Temptations)
- Shandi Finnessey, Miss Missouri USA 2004, Miss USA 2004
- Ryan Howard, former Major League Baseball player
- Ryan Kalkbrenner, college basketball player
- Jeremy Lucido, photographer
- Kathleen Madigan, comedian
- Sally Hampton, Writer, Producer, Actress
- Kyle McClellan, former Major League Baseball player
- Michael McDonald, singer-songwriter; formerly of the Doobie Brothers and Steely Dan
- Rita Meyer, All-American Girls Professional Baseball player
- Vinegar Bend Mizell, lived here during his time with the St. Louis Cardinals
- Al Nipper, former Major League Baseball player
- Barry Orton, former professional wrestler
- "Cowboy" Bob Orton Jr, wrestler, WWE Hall of Fame
- Randy Orton, WWE wrestler
- Neil Rackers, NFL football player
- Bobby Rhine, Major League Soccer player
- Kerry Robinson, former Major League Baseball player
- Kimora Lee Simmons, retired supermodel, head of design for Baby Phat
- Smino, rapper and singer
- Hal R. Smith, lived here during his time with the Cardinals
- Mike Sorber, Major League Soccer player
- John A. Stormer, pseudo-conservative polemicist, author of None Dare Call It Treason
- Perry Van der Beck, soccer player and coach
- Charles Felix Van Quickenborne, Jesuit missionary
- Ira Vandever, quarterback for the Stuttgart Scorpions in the German Football League
- Dick Weber, Hall of Fame bowler
- Pete Weber, Hall of Fame bowler
- Bob Wiesler, former Major League Baseball player
- Bill Wilkerson, sportscaster, radio host (KMOX)
- Devin Williams, professional baseball pitcher
- Clint Zweifel, former State Treasurer of Missouri

== See also ==
- List of cities in Missouri
