= McCluer High School =

American high school in Florissant, Missouri

Location
- 1896 South Florissant Road; Florissant, Missouri 63031; United States; 38.7715°N 90.3108°W

Information
- Type: Title 1 high school
- Motto: Enlisted, Enrolled, Employed
- Established: 1957; 69 years ago
- Locale: Berkeley, Cool Valley, Ferguson, Florissant (Portion of), Hazelwood (Portion of), and Kinloch
- School district: Ferguson-Florissant School District
- Head Principal: Derrick Mitchell
- Teaching staff: 65.33 (on an FTE basis)
- Grades: 9–12
- Enrollment: 1,075 (2024–25)
- Student to teacher ratio: 16.45
- Colors: Red, white, and blue
- Athletics conference: Suburban Conference
- Mascot: Cosmo the Comet
- Nickname: Comets
- Website: mchs.fergflor.org

McCluer High School is a high school located in Florissant, Missouri. It is a part of the Ferguson-Florissant School District. The building principal is Dr. Derrick Mitchell, with four Assistant lateral (moving with, all four years) Grade-level Principals, and the school is the home of the McCluer Comets.

== Pre-history ==
When McCluer opened in 1958, it was a junior high school. The history of McCluer goes back to the mid to late 19th century.

=== Ferguson School Central School ===
Ferguson School Central School (now known as the Central Elementary School) located at 201 Wesley Avenue, opened in 1880 in the Ferguson Public School District, in Ferguson, Missouri. In 1903 the name of Ferguson School was changed to Central School. The high school students attending Central School transferred to the new John M. Vogt High School in 1930.

Built as a grammar school building (grades 1-8) between 1877 and 1880, Expanded in 1903 to provide one of the first accredited four-year public high schools in St. Louis County, the building has been continuously used as a public school for over 100 years, maintaining its integrity of use. The original four room building remains intact as the core of the present elementary school (Central Elementary School) with additions dating from 1895, 1904, 1908, and 1925 to 1927.

The school is now called Central Elementary School. The school currently has 1,530 students enrolled. The building for the former Ferguson School Central School is listed as one of the National Register of Historic Places listings in St. Louis County, Missouri, since 1984.

=== John M. Vogt High School ===
John M. Vogt High School is located at 200 Church Avenue in Ferguson, Missouri and named for a merchant and former school board member. The school opened in 1930. It was built on the grounds of an open-air theater; property which was donated to the Ferguson Public School District by the Community Hall Association. John M. Vogt High School was the first building in the Ferguson School District to be used strictly for high school students. The new high school opened with students that had transferred from Central School. Now Vogt Elementary School, John M. Vogt High School's yearbook, which began in 1931, was named the "Crest". Due to redistricting, Vogt school is planning to close by the beginning of the 2019 school district. The idea to keep Vogt school open as the new STEAM High school was an option, but McCluer South Berkeley is the likely candidate for the new STEAM High school, which would leave Vogt Elementary to close.

=== Ferguson High School ===
Ferguson High School opened in 1939 with 400 students that transferred from John M. Vogt High School. It was built by the Ferguson Public School District on the rumored-to-be-haunted January Estate, which had also been used as the city dump and was known as Blizzard Hill. Located at 701 January Avenue, the school was constructed with Works Progress Administration (WPA) financial assistance. The basement of the school had a firing range for target practice by students belonging to the school's NRA Club. 1952 saw the merger of the Ferguson Public School District and the Florissant School District. Ferguson High School's last graduating class was in 1962, with the school becoming Ferguson Junior High, now Ferguson Middle School. Summer camps at the school were named Camp Comet. The Ferguson High School's yearbook was named the "Crest".

== History ==
McCluer High School, located at 1896 South New Florissant Road, Florissant, Missouri, the school opened in 1957 as a junior high school as a part of the Ferguson Florissant School District. In 1962, when Ferguson High School closed, its students moved to McCluer; now McCluer Senior High School. McCluer's mascot is Cosmo the Comet, with all corresponding athletic teams and students referred to as the McCluer Comets.

In 1971, McCluer had more than 4,500 students with a graduating class of 1264 students. This was the largest class to graduate in Missouri that year. In 1972, the year prior to splitting students into McCluer North and McCluer High Schools, the class was over 1,400 students. The school was very overcrowded, built to handle 3,300. To handle extra students, there were two overlapping sessions every day, with early classes beginning at 6:45 am. and late classes running until 5:30 pm. The school colors are red, white, and blue. The name of the school newspaper is The Daily Comet and McCluer High School's yearbook is named the "Crest".

McCluer High School was named for Virgil C. McCluer, superintendent of the Ferguson School District for 30 years until he retired in 1964.

== Notable alumni ==
- Gwen Berry, US track and field
- Ralph Eberhart (1964), retired USAF 4-star general
- Michael McDonald (1970), American singer and songwriter, winner of five Grammy Awards
- Steve Pisarkiewicz (1972), former professional American football quarterback
- Tyron Woodley (2000), All-American wrestler; current mixed martial artist; and won the Ultimate Fighting Championship
- Dan O'Bannon (1964), screenwriter and actor for A-List movies like Alien
- Keyon Harrold (1999), American jazz trumpeter, vocalist, songwriter, and producer
