= Dellwood, Missouri =

- City
- Logo

- Location of Dellwood, Missouri
- Coordinates: 38°45′23″N 90°16′36″W
- Country: United States
- State: Missouri
- County: St. Louis
- Townships: Ferguson, Norwood

Government
  - Mayor: Kenneth Robinson (acting)

Area
  - Total: 1.03 sq mi (2.68 km^{2})
  - Land: 1.03 sq mi (2.68 km^{2})
  - Water: 0 sq mi (0.00 km^{2})
- Elevation: 515 ft (157 m)

Population (2020)
  - Total: 4,914
  - Density: 4,740.7/sq mi (1,830.39/km^{2})
- Time zone: UTC-6 (Central (CST))
  - Summer (DST): UTC-5 (CDT)
- ZIP code: 63135, 63136
- Area code: 314
- FIPS code: 29-19018
- GNIS feature ID: 2394504
- Website: www.cityofdellwoodmo.com

Dellwood is a city in the north St. Louis County, Missouri, United States. The population was 4,914 at the 2020 census. The city encompasses a mostly residential area between Chambers Road and Interstate 270, as well a number of businesses along West Florissant Avenue.

== Geography ==
According to the United States Census Bureau, the city has a total area of 1.03 square miles (2.67 km^{2}), all land.

== Demographics ==
Historical population
Census	Pop.	Note	%±
1960	4,720		—
1970	7,137		51.2%
1980	6,200		−13.1%
1990	5,245		−15.4%
2000	5,255		0.2%
2010	5,025		−4.4%
2020	4,914		−2.2%
U.S. Decennial Census

=== Racial and ethnic composition ===
Dellwood, Missouri – Racial and ethnic composition Note: the US Census treats Hispanic/Latino as an ethnic category. This table excludes Latinos from the racial categories and assigns them to a separate category. Hispanics/Latinos may be of any race.
Race / Ethnicity (NH = Non-Hispanic)	Pop 2000	Pop 2010	Pop 2020	% 2000	% 2010	% 2020
White alone (NH)	2,068	894	503	39.35%	17.79%	10.24%
Black or African American alone (NH)	3,056	3,967	4,160	58.15%	78.95%	84.66%
Native American or Alaska Native alone (NH)	15	21	7	0.29%	0.42%	0.14%
Asian alone (NH)	34	20	39	0.65%	0.40%	0.79%
Native Hawaiian or Pacific Islander alone (NH)	0	0	1	0.00%	0.00%	0.02%
Other race alone (NH)	8	6	14	0.15%	0.12%	0.28%
Mixed race or Multiracial (NH)	56	77	119	1.07%	1.53%	2.42%
Hispanic or Latino (any race)	18	40	71	0.34%	0.80%	1.44%
Total	5,255	5,025	4,914	100.00%	100.00%	100.00%

=== 2020 census ===
As of the 2020 census, Dellwood had a population of 4,914. The median age was 35.6 years. 27.9% of residents were under the age of 18 and 11.9% of residents were 65 years of age or older. For every 100 females there were 79.3 males, and for every 100 females age 18 and over there were 73.8 males age 18 and over.

100.0% of residents lived in urban areas, while 0.0% lived in rural areas.

There were 1,816 households in Dellwood, of which 36.4% had children under the age of 18 living in them. Of all households, 26.5% were married-couple households, 16.9% were households with a male householder and no spouse or partner present, and 50.7% were households with a female householder and no spouse or partner present. About 25.6% of all households were made up of individuals and 9.3% had someone living alone who was 65 years of age or older.

There were 1,983 housing units, of which 8.4% were vacant. The homeowner vacancy rate was 1.2% and the rental vacancy rate was 11.4%.

=== 2010 census ===
As of the census of 2010, there were 5,025 people, 1,834 households, and 1,336 families living in the city. The population density was 4,878.6 inhabitants per square mile (1,883.6/km^{2}). There were 1,978 housing units at an average density of 1,920.4 per square mile (741.5/km^{2}). The racial makeup of the city was 18.0% White, 79.2% African American, 0.5% Native American, 0.4% Asian, 0.3% from other races, and 1.7% from two or more races. Hispanic or Latino of any race were 0.8% of the population.

There were 1,834 households, of which 42.8% had children under the age of 18 living with them, 32.5% were married couples living together, 34.1% had a female householder with no husband present, 6.3% had a male householder with no wife present, and 27.2% were non-families. 23.4% of all households were made up of individuals, and 7.4% had someone living alone who was 65 years of age or older. The average household size was 2.74 and the average family size was 3.22.

The median age in the city was 34.6 years. 29.1% of residents were under the age of 18; 9.7% were between the ages of 18 and 24; 26.4% were from 25 to 44; 25.7% were from 45 to 64; and 8.9% were 65 years of age or older. The gender makeup of the city was 44.5% male and 55.5% female.

=== 2000 census ===
As of the census of 2000, there were 5,255 people, 1,906 households, and 1,408 families living in the city. The population density was 5,108.2 inhabitants per square mile (1,972.3/km^{2}). There were 1,978 housing units at an average density of 1,922.8 per square mile (742.4/km^{2}). The racial makeup of the city was 39.51% White, 58.19% African American, 0.29% Native American, 0.65% Asian, 0.21% from other races, and 1.16% from two or more races. Hispanic or Latino of any race were 0.34% of the population.

There were 1,906 households, out of which 40.3% had children under the age of 18 living with them, 44.0% were married couples living together, 24.4% had a female householder with no husband present, and 26.1% were non-families. 23.4% of all households were made up of individuals, and 10.9% had someone living alone who was 65 years of age or older. The average household size was 2.76 and the average family size was 3.24.

In the city, the population was spread out, with 31.6% under the age of 18, 7.4% from 18 to 24, 31.6% from 25 to 44, 17.4% from 45 to 64, and 12.0% who were 65 years of age or older. The median age was 34 years. For every 100 females, there were 86.3 males. For every 100 females age 18 and over, there were 80.7 males.

The median income for a household in the city was $43,210, and the median income for a family was $43,887. Males had a median income of $33,581 versus $24,836 for females. The per capita income for the city was $16,856. About 2.3% of families and 3.0% of the population were below the poverty line, including 2.8% of those under age 18 and 5.3% of those age 65 or over.

== Police Department ==
In 2012, the city of Dellwood disbanded its police department, in favor of having services provided by the St. Louis County Police Department. Dellwood police cars operated by the county police are now specifically marked for the city.

== Education ==
Much of Dellwood is in the Riverview Gardens School District, while portions are in Ferguson-Florissant School District and the Hazelwood School District.

Riverview Gardens High School is the comprehensive high school of the Riverview Gardens district.
