= STEAM Academy at McCluer South-Berkeley =

McCluer South-Berkeley High School

Location
- 201 Brotherton Lane; Ferguson, Missouri; United States; 38.7326°N 90.3047°W

Information
- Type: Public high school
- Motto: Home of the Mighty Super Bulldogs
- Established: January 2004; 22 years ago
- School district: Ferguson-Florissant School District
- Principal: Jane Crawford
- Faculty: 29.40 (FTE)
- Enrollment: 437 (2022–23)
- Student to teacher ratio: 14.86
- Colors: Blue, white, and gray
- Athletics conference: Suburban Conference
- Nickname: Bulldogs
- Website: msb.fergflor.org

McCluer South-Berkeley High School is a grade 9–12 secondary school located at 201 Brotherton Lane in the city of Ferguson, Missouri, a suburb of St. Louis. Located in the Ferguson-Florissant School District (FFSD), McCluer South Berkeley is the newest secondary school.

== History ==
The school opened in January 2004, replacing Berkeley High School in Berkeley, which had closed in December 2003 due to expansion of the Lambert-St. Louis International Airport.

When it was a zoned school, MSB educated students from the cities of Cool Valley, Ferguson, Kinloch and Berkeley.

As of October 10, 2018, the Board of Education has decided to convert MSB into a STEAM school. It was decided by a 4 to 2 vote, with different ethnic group board members making different votes. Since 2019 it is now known as STEAM Academy at McCluer South-Berkeley High, following the STEAM Academy Middle School created in 2017.

== Notable alumni ==
- Lawrence Woods, CFL player
