= Roy Clay =

American computer scientist (1929–2024)

- Born: August 22, 1929; Kinloch, Missouri, U.S.
- Died: September 22, 2024 (aged 95); Oakland, California, U.S.
- Education: Saint Louis University
- Employer: Hewlett-Packard
- Title: Founder and CEO of ROD-L Electronics
- Spouse: Virginia Clay (m. 1957; died 1995)
- Children: 3

Roy Lee Clay Sr. (August 22, 1929 – September 22, 2024) was an African American computer scientist and inventor. He was a founding member of the computer division at Hewlett-Packard, where he led the team that created the HP 2116A 16-bit minicomputer. He was Chief Executive Officer of ROD-L Electronics, an electrical-safety test equipment manufacturer.

== Early life and education ==
Clay was born on August 22, 1929, in Kinloch, Missouri. At the time, Kinloch was the oldest African-American community that was incorporated in Missouri. During his summer holidays, he worked as a gardener in Ferguson, but was encouraged by the local police to leave the majority white town. Despite experiencing racism throughout his childhood, Clay's mother told him, "you will face racism the rest of your life, but don't ever let that be a reason why you don't succeed".

Clay attended Douglass High School, a segregated school, and eventually was awarded a scholarship to study mathematics at Saint Louis University (SLU). While at SLU, Clay wanted to become a baseball player. He was one of the first African-Americans to graduate from SLU, earning a bachelor's degree in math in 1951.

== Career ==
After struggling to find work in technology, Clay started work as a school teacher. At an interview for McDonnell Aircraft Corporation, Clay was taken aside and told "Mr. Clay, I'm very sorry, we don't hire professional Negroes". He taught himself to write software, and by 1958 was a programmer at Lawrence Livermore National Laboratory (LLNL). Clay's early professional work involved creating a radiation tracking system to study the aftermath of a nuclear explosion. While working at LLNL, Clay was introduced to David Packard, who encouraged Clay to apply for a job.

After leaving LLNL, Clay worked at Control Data Corporation, where he created new Fortran compilers. In 1962, Clay moved to Palo Alto, California. Clay joined Hewlett-Packard (HP), where he helped to launch and lead the Computer Science division in 1965. He was director of the team who developed the HP 2116A, one of the company's first minicomputers. Clay stayed at HP into the 1970s, eventually rising to being the highest-ranking African-American member of staff. While working at HP, Clay developed several initiatives to improve the representation of African-Americans in Silicon Valley, including hiring from HBCUs. He recognized the need to test electrical products for safety, and left HP in 1971 to start his own business.

In 1977, Clay was the founder of ROD-L Electronics in Menlo Park, California, a "hipot and electrical-safety test equipment manufacturer." ROD-L was the first producer of electrical safety test equipment to be certified by the UL. An early proponent of flex time, he allowed employees to set their own schedule outside of core hours, stating, "I decided that the hours of greatest communication were between 10 am and 2 pm. Therefore, I asked that everyone be in the office between those hours, to avoid having trouble with scheduling meetings."

In 2002, Clay was elected by the African American Museum and Library at Oakland as one of the most important African-Americans working in technology. San Mateo County awarded ROD-L Electronics the Dads Count Family Friendly Employer Award, and Clay was inducted into the Silicon Valley Hall of Fame in 2003. In 2021, the city of St. Louis opened the Roy Clay Sr. Computer Lab in his honor.

== Personal life ==
Clay was born as the fourth child out of nine children in the family of Charles and Emma Jean Clay. He married Virginia Conners in 1957, and together they raised three sons: Roy Jr., Rodney, and Chris. After his wife died in 1995, Clay founded the Virginia Clay Annual Golf Classic. Clay was involved with local politics, and was the first African-American to join the city council of Palo Alto in 1973. He was elected vice mayor in 1976. In 1989, he became the first African-American member of the Olympic Club. In addition, in 1992, he was a founding member of the Olympic Club Foundation. Clay published a memoir, Unstoppable: The Unlikely Story of a Silicon Valley Godfather, in July 2022. He died on September 22, 2024, at the age of 95.
