= Berkeley, Missouri =

City in St. Louis County, Missouri, United States

- City
- Flag Seal

- Location of Berkeley, Missouri
- Coordinates: 38°44′38″N 90°20′10″W
- Country: United States
- State: Missouri
- County: St. Louis
- Townships: Airport, Norwood
- Incorporated: 1937

Government
  - Mayor: Theodore Hoskins

Area
  - Total: 4.97 sq mi (12.87 km^{2})
  - Land: 4.96 sq mi (12.85 km^{2})
  - Water: 0.0077 sq mi (0.02 km^{2})
- Elevation: 604 ft (184 m)

Population (2020)
  - Total: 8,228
  - Density: 1,658.6/sq mi (640.37/km^{2})
- Time zone: UTC-6 (Central (CST))
  - Summer (DST): UTC-5 (CDT)
- FIPS code: 29-04906
- GNIS feature ID: 2394145
- Website: cityofberkeley.us

Berkeley is an inner-ring suburb of St. Louis in St. Louis County, Missouri, United States. The population was 8,228 at the 2020 census. Portions of St. Louis Lambert International Airport are within the city limits.

== History ==
Berkeley incorporated in 1937. The community was named after Berkeley Acres, a planned community.

== Geography ==
According to the United States Census Bureau, the city has a total area of 4.97 square miles (12.87 km^{2}), all land.

== Demographics ==
=== Racial and ethnic composition ===
Berkeley city, Missouri – Racial and ethnic composition Note: the US Census treats Hispanic/Latino as an ethnic category. This table excludes Latinos from the racial categories and assigns them to a separate category. Hispanics/Latinos may be of any race.
Race / Ethnicity (NH = Non-Hispanic)	Pop 2000	Pop 2010	Pop 2020	% 2000	% 2010	% 2020
White alone (NH)	2,038	1,154	906	20.25%	12.85%	11.01%
Black or African American alone (NH)	7,688	7,312	6,295	76.40%	81.44%	76.51%
Native American or Alaska Native alone (NH)	24	19	19	0.24%	0.21%	0.23%
Asian alone (NH)	37	33	56	0.37%	0.37%	0.68%
Pacific Islander or Native Hawaiian alone (NH)	2	4	6	0.02%	0.04%	0.07%
Other race alone (NH)	12	16	67	0.12%	0.18%	0.81%
Mixed race or Multiracial (NH)	153	128	337	1.52%	1.43%	4.10%
Hispanic or Latino (any race)	109	312	542	1.08%	3.48%	6.59%
Total	10,063	8,978	8,228	100.00%	100.00%	100.00%

Historical population
Census	Pop.	Note	%±
1940	2,577		—
1950	5,268		104.4%
1960	14,123		168.1%
1970	19,743		39.8%
1980	15,922		−19.4%
1990	12,450		−21.8%
2000	10,063		−19.2%
2010	8,978		−10.8%
2020	8,228		−8.4%
U.S. Decennial Census; 2010 2020

=== 2020 census ===
As of the 2020 census, Berkeley had a population of 8,228. The city had 2,243 families. The population density was 1,658.9 per square mile (640.3/km^{2}). The median age was 34.5 years. 26.9% of residents were under the age of 18 and 13.7% of residents were 65 years of age or older. For every 100 females there were 82.6 males, and for every 100 females age 18 and over there were 77.3 males age 18 and over.

100.0% of residents lived in urban areas, while 0.0% lived in rural areas.

There were 3,163 households in Berkeley, of which 35.0% had children under the age of 18 living in them. Of all households, 21.8% were married-couple households, 19.7% were households with a male householder and no spouse or partner present, and 50.5% were households with a female householder and no spouse or partner present. About 30.0% of all households were made up of individuals and 11.8% had someone living alone who was 65 years of age or older. The average household size was 2.5 and the average family size was 3.2.

There were 3,705 housing units, of which 14.6% were vacant. The homeowner vacancy rate was 4.5% and the rental vacancy rate was 12.5%.

=== Income and poverty ===
The 2016–2020 5-year American Community Survey estimates show that the median household income was $35,027 (with a margin of error of +/- $8,139) and the median family income was $33,139 (+/- $7,136). Males had a median income of $27,288 (+/- $8,926) versus $27,476 (+/- $3,759) for females. The median income for those above 16 years old was $27,399 (+/- $3,948). Approximately, 21.0% of families and 21.2% of the population were below the poverty line, including 23.1% of those under the age of 18 and 14.7% of those ages 65 or over.

=== 2010 census ===
As of the census of 2010, there were 8,978 people, 3,275 households, and 2,310 families living in the city. The population density was 1,806.4 inhabitants per square mile (697.5/km^{2}). There were 3,776 housing units at an average density of 759.8 per square mile (293.4/km^{2}). The racial makeup of the city was 81.8% African American, 14.3% White, 3.5% Hispanic or Latino, 0.4% Asian, 0.2% Native American, 0.1% Pacific Islander, 1.6% from other races, and 1.7% from two or more races made up its population.

There were 3,275 households, of which 42.3% had children under the age of 18 living with them, 25.6% were married couples living together, 37.7% had a female householder with no husband present, 7.2% had a male householder with no wife present, and 29.5% were non-families. 24.9% of all households were made up of individuals, and 8.3% had someone living alone who was 65 years of age or older. The average household size was 2.74 and the average family size was 3.26.

The median age in the city was 32.3 years. 30.5% of residents were under the age of 18; 9.6% were between the ages of 18 and 24; 25.7% were from 25 to 44; 23.4% were from 45 to 64; and 10.8% were 65 years of age or older. The gender makeup of the city was 44.9% male and 55.1% female.

=== 2000 census ===
As of the census of 2000, there were 10,063 people, 3,600 households, and 2,588 families living in the city. The population density was 2,040.6 inhabitants per square mile (787.9/km^{2}). There were 3,953 housing units at an average density of 801.6 per square mile (309.5/km^{2}). The racial makeup of the city was 76.69% African American, 20.64% White, and 1.60% from two or more races. Hispanic or Latino of any race were 1.08% of the population. And 0.37% Asian, 0.26% Native American, 0.02% Pacific Islander, and 0.43% from other races made the city's population.

There were 3,600 households, out of which 37.3% had children under the age of 18 living with them, 32.2% were married couples living together, 33.8% had a female householder with no husband present, and 28.1% were non-families. 23.9% of all households were made up of individuals, and 7.8% had someone living alone who was 65 years of age or older. The average household size was 2.76 and the average family size was 3.25.

In the city the population dispersal was 32.2% under the age of 18, 9.3% from 18 to 24, 27.8% from 25 to 44, 19.8% from 45 to 64, and 11.0% who were 65 years of age or older. The median age was 31 years. For every 100 females, there were 81.7 males. For every 100 females age 18 and over, there were 74.9 males.

The median income for a household in the city was $32,219, and the median income for a family was $34,148. Males had a median income of $29,511 versus $24,338 for females. The per capita income for the city was $13,788. About 17.0% of families and 19.3% of the population were below the poverty line, including 29.0% of those under age 18 and 10.8% of those age 65 or over.

== Economy ==
Boeing Integrated Defense Systems is headquartered in Berkeley. Prior to its merger with Boeing, McDonnell Douglas was headquartered in the same complex in Berkeley. Boeing chose to locate the defense systems offices in the St. Louis area because of the metropolitan area's central location in the United States, the role of the space and aircraft programs of the former McDonnell Douglas location, and bipartisan support from area politicians. At the site, Boeing maintains the James S. McDonnell Prologue Room, containing a museum exhibition of Boeing memorabilia. Boeing moved its defense unit to Arlington County, Virginia in 2017.

== Education ==
The majority of Berkeley is within the Ferguson-Florissant School District. Airport Elementary School and Holman Elementary School serve separate sections of Berkeley and are within the city. Elementary schools outside of Berkeley serving sections of the city include Johnson-Wabash in Ferguson and Walnut Grove in Calverton Park.

Berkeley Middle School is located in Berkeley. McCluer South-Berkeley High School is in Ferguson.

The Berkeley School District opened in 1937 after a dispute over where a school for black people should be located, with the black residents of southern Kinloch and the white residents of northern Kinloch opposing each other. The newly formed school district, mostly white, took over Kinloch High School, which had opened during that year; previously a part of the Kinloch School District, the high school was renamed Berkeley High School. The high school, located in what is now Berkeley, was exclusively for white students. At a later point a new Berkeley High School campus opened in a new location, and the former Berkeley High School became Berkeley Middle School. On June 7, 1975, a U.S. district court ordered the Ferguson-Florissant School District to annex the Berkeley School District and the Kinloch School District; therefore the Ferguson-Florissant district began to serve Berkeley. In December 2003 the former Berkeley High School closed due to expansion of Lambert-St. Louis Airport. In January 2004 McCluer South-Berkeley High School opened.

A small portion of Berkeley is in the Hazelwood School District.

== See also ==
- List of cities in Missouri
- Washington Park Cemetery, a historical African-American cemetery in Berkeley
