= Ferguson-Florissant School District =

School district in Missouri, United States

Coordinates: 38°47′35″N 90°18′06″W

Address
- 8855 Dunn Rd Hazelwood, St. Louis County, Missouri, 63042; United States

District information
- Grades: PK-12
- Superintendent: Dr. Howard E. Fields III
- Governing agency: Missouri Department of Elementary and Secondary Education
- Schools: 22
- Budget: $161 million (2025-2026)
- NCES District ID: 2912010

Students and staff
- Students: 10,562 (2017-2018)
- Teachers: 723.87 (2017-2018)
- Staff: 2632 (2017-2018)

Other information
- Website: www.fergflor.org

The Ferguson-Florissant School District (FFSD) is a public school district located in Greater St. Louis and in Missouri. Its headquarters are in Hazelwood. The district covers all or part of 11 municipalities, serving more than 11,000 students from preschool through 12th grade.

FFSD operates 17 elementary schools, four middle schools (one a STEAM and Gifted Academy), three A+ and NCA-CASI-accredited high schools and an alternative school. It also offers a comprehensive early education program, the Challenger Learning Center space education facility and the Little Creek Nature Area, a 97-acre nature preserve used for experiential learning on subjects such as biology, ecology and related areas of science.

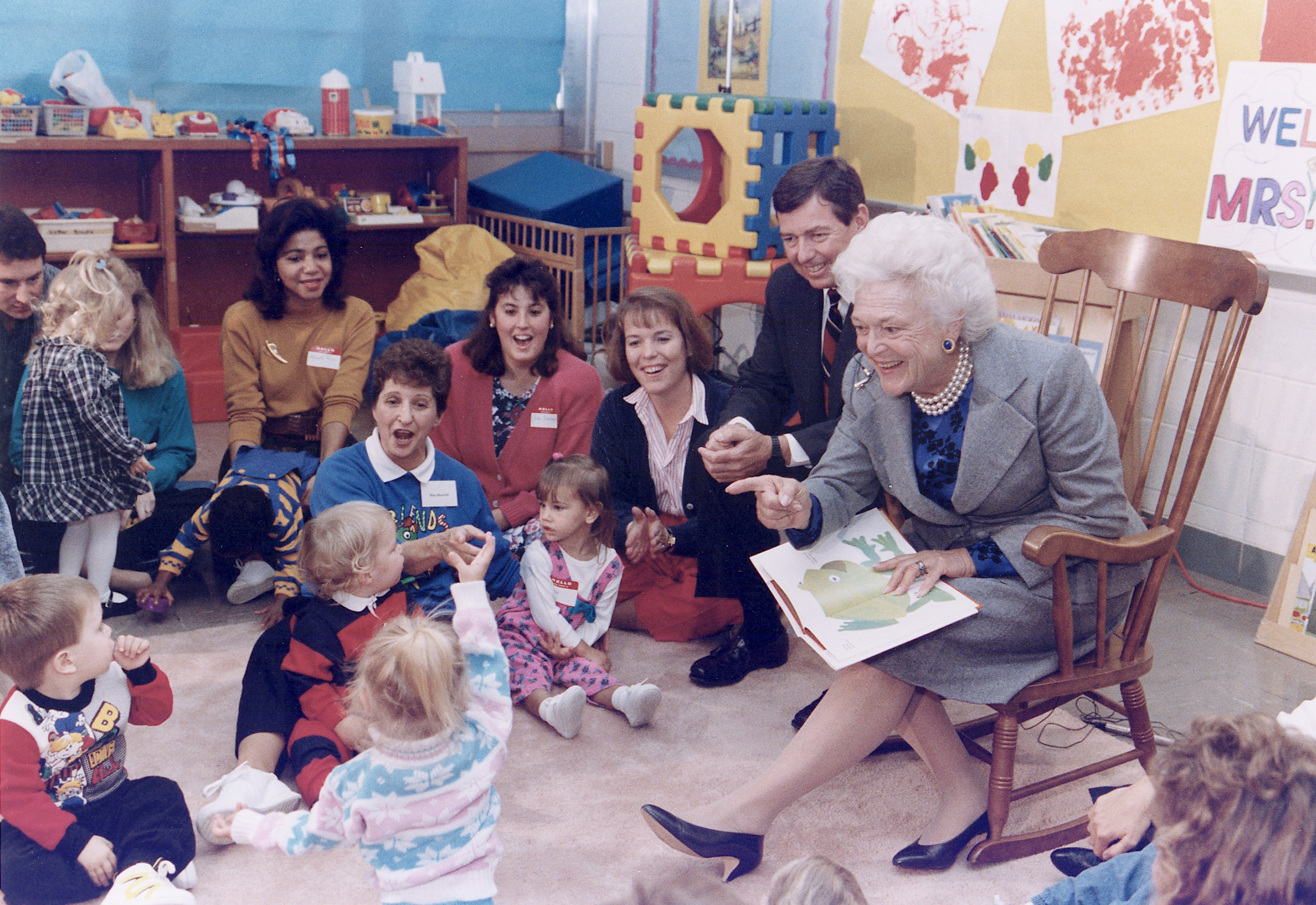
Missouri Governor John Ashcroft and First Lady Barbara Bush with a Ferguson-Florissant "Parents as Teachers" group in October 1991. Mrs. Bush (in rocking chair) is reading Brown Bear Brown Bear to the children.

== History ==
On June 7, 1975, a U.S. district court ordered FFSD to annex the Berkeley School District and the Kinloch School District; therefore, the Ferguson-Florissant district began to serve Berkeley and Kinloch.

In 2004, Berkeley High School closed, replaced by McCluer South-Berkeley High School.

On December 8, 2010, the Board of Education named Dr. Art J. McCoy, II as Superintendent. He was the first African-American superintendent for the school district and at age 33 was one of the youngest in the state of Missouri and nation.

On Jan. 30, 2015, the Board of Education unanimously approved Dr. Joseph Davis as superintendent of schools, effective July 1.

In 2018 the district formally closed its previous administration building, which it already moved out from. On a 4–2 vote, in which board members of different ethnic backgrounds voted different ways, the district closed or moved a different program into Airport Elementary, Mark Twain Alternative, and Vogt Elementary schools and converted McCluer South into a selective STEAM school.

== Boundary ==
The district includes all of Calverton Park and Kinloch, the majorities of Berkeley, Cool Valley, and Ferguson, about half of Florissant, and parts of Dellwood, Hazelwood, Jennings, and Normandy. It also includes a section of the Old Jamestown census-designated place.

== Operations ==
Previously the district headquarters were in Florissant.

== Schools ==
High schools

- McCluer High School
- McCluer North High School
- STEAM Academy at McCluer South-Berkeley, formerly McCluer South-Berkeley High School

Middle schools

- Cross Keys Middle School
- Ferguson Middle School
- STEAM Academy Middle School

Sixth grade centers

- Johnson-Wabash Sixth Grade Center, formerly Johnson-Wabash Elementary School
- Wedgewood Sixth Grade Center, formerly Wedgwood Elementary School

Intermediate schools (grades 3–5)

- Berkeley Intermediate School
- Combs Intermediate School
- Griffith Intermediate School
- Halls Ferry Intermediate School
- Lee-Hamilton Intermediate School
- Robinwood Intermediate School

Primary schools (grades PreK-2)

- Bermuda Primary School
- Central Primary School
- Commons Lane Primary School
- Duchesne Primary School
- Holman Primary School
- Parker Road Primary School
- Walnut Grove Primary School

Alternative Programs

- Mark Twain Restoration and Re-Entry Center - Was Mark Twain Student Support Center until 2019

Former schools

- Airport Elementary School - Closed 2019
- Berkeley Middle School
- Cool Valley Elementary School
- Vogt Elementary School - Closed 2019

Students with disabilities are referred to the Special School District of St. Louis County (SSD) facilities. Ferguson-Florrisant residents are zoned to Ackerman School (ages 5–13) and Northview High School (ages 14–21) in Florissant. The SSD district also maintains North Technical High School in Florissant.
