= David L. Levin =

American politician

David L. Levin (born July 24, 1949) in St. Louis, is an American politician who served as a Missouri state representative, being first elected in 1994. He was elected as a Republican and represented parts of St. Louis County, District 82. Levin has worked as an electrician and financial analyst from St. Louis County, Missouri.

== Early life and education ==
Levin was born in 1949 in St. Louis, and graduated from Berkeley High School in 1967. He went to the St. Louis Community College, and graduated from the Electrical Industry Training Center.

== Personal life ==
Levin is married to Valerie, and has two children.
