= Lawrence Woods III =

American gridiron football player (born 1998)

- Woods with the BC Lions in 2026

Profile
- Positions: Defensive back, return specialist

Personal information
- Born: April 9, 1998 (age 28); St. Louis, Missouri, U.S.
- Listed height: 5 ft 9 in (1.75 m)
- Listed weight: 180 lb (82 kg)

Career information
- High school: McCluer South (Ferguson, Missouri)
- College: Truman State
- NFL draft: 2021: undrafted

Career history
- 2021: New Orleans Saints*
- 2022–2023: Hamilton Tiger-Cats
- 2024: BC Lions*
- 2024–2025: Hamilton Tiger-Cats
- 2026: BC Lions
- * Offseason or practice squad member only

Awards and highlights
- GLVC Special Teams Player of the Year (2018); All-American (2018)
- Stats at CFL.ca

Lawrence Woods III (born April 9, 1998) is an American professional football defensive back and return specialist. He played college football at Truman State. He has also been a member of the New Orleans Saints of the National Football League (NFL), and the Hamilton Tiger-Cats of the CFL.

== Early life ==
Woods III played high school football at McCluer South High School in Ferguson, Missouri, and was a two-year starter. He also participated in track and wrestling, and was a member of the National Honor Society in high school. He was a member of the 4 × 400 meter relay team that won the state title.

== College career ==
Woods III played college football for the Truman Bulldogs of Truman State University. He played in 10 games his freshman year in 2016, recording 19 tackles and three interceptions while also returning three kickoffs for 145 yards and one touchdown. He did not appear in any games in 2017, and was redshirted. Woods III played in 11 games during the 2018 season, totaling 43 tackles and two sacks while also returning 12 kickoffs for 609 yards and three touchdowns, earning GLVC Special Teams Player of the Year and D2CCCA All-America recognition as a kick returner. He only played in four games in 2019 due to a torn ACL. He did not appear in any games during COVID-19 shortened 2020 season.

== Professional career ==
Pre-draft measurables
Height	Weight	Arm length	Hand span	40-yard dash	20-yard shuttle	Three-cone drill	Vertical jump	Broad jump	Bench press
5 ft 9 2/5 in (1.76 m)	182 lb (83 kg)	31 1/4 in (0.79 m)	9 3/8 in (0.24 m)	4.52 s	4.28 s	7.08 s	37.5 in (0.95 m)	10 ft 4 in (3.15 m)	13 reps
All values from Pro Day

=== New Orleans Saints ===
May 14, 2021, after going undrafted in the 2020 NFL draft, Woods III signed with the New Orleans Saints. He was waived on August 2, 2021, re-signed on August 13, 2021, and waived again on August 18, 2021.

=== Hamilton Tiger-Cats (first stint) ===
On April 21, 2022, Woods III was signed by the Hamilton Tiger-Cats of the Canadian Football League (CFL). On August 25, 2022, Woods III was placed on injured reserve. He rejoined the active roster October 6, 2022. Woods III dressed in 14 games for the Tiger-Cats that season, starting one, returning 43 kickoffs for 990 yards and one touchdown, and 62 punts for 807 yards while also making three defensive tackles and nine special teams tackles.

Woods III was moved between injured reserve, the practice roster, and the active roster several times in 2023. Overall, he dressed in seven games, starting four, returning 13 kickoffs for 277 yards and recording 20 defensive tackles and two special teams tackles. He was released by the Tiger-Cats on November 5, 2023.

=== BC Lions (first stint) ===
On December 4, 2023, Woods III signed with the BC Lions. He was released on May 2, 2024.

=== Hamilton Tiger-Cats (second stint) ===
On May 6, 2024, Woods III re-signed with the Tiger-Cats. He went on to play an additional two seasons with the team, then became a free agent upon the expiry of his contract, on February 10, 2026.

=== BC Lions (second stint) ===
On August 25, 2026, it was announced that Woods III had re-signed with the BC Lions, this time joining their practice roster. On September 3, 2026, Woods III was promoted to the Lions' active roster. On September 24, 2026, Woods III was placed on the Lions' reserve roster after suffering a shoulder injury the previous week. He rejoined the active roster on October 2, 2026, after his injury had healed. He was released on October 6, 2026.
