= Calverton Park, Missouri =

City in St. Louis County, Missouri, United States

- City
- Logo
- Motto: "A Community of Neighbors"
- Location of Calverton Park, Missouri
- Coordinates: 38°45′56″N 90°18′37″W
- Country: United States
- State: Missouri
- County: St. Louis
- Township: Ferguson

Government
  - Type: Board of Trustees
  - Mayor: James A. Paunovich
  - Clerk: Jeanne King Blanton

Area
  - Total: 0.42 sq mi (1.08 km^{2})
  - Land: 0.41 sq mi (1.07 km^{2})
  - Water: 0.0039 sq mi (0.01 km^{2})
- Elevation: 597 ft (182 m)

Population (2020)
  - Total: 1,143
  - Density: 2,778.5/sq mi (1,072.79/km^{2})
- Time zone: UTC-6 (Central (CST))
  - Summer (DST): UTC-5 (CDT)
- ZIP code: 63135
- Area code: 314
- FIPS code: 29-10612
- GNIS feature ID: 2397535
- Website: www.calvertonparkmo.com

Calverton Park is a city in Ferguson Township, St. Louis County, Missouri, United States. The population was 1,143 at the 2020 census. The Village of Calverton Park incorporated as the City of Calverton Park in 2014.

== Geography ==
According to the United States Census Bureau, the city has a total area of 0.41 square miles (1.06 km^{2}), all land.

Calverton Park is surrounded by three other St. Louis County municipalities: Ferguson, Florissant and Hazelwood.

== Demographics ==
=== 2020 census ===
Calverton Park city, Missouri – Racial and ethnic composition Note: the US Census treats Hispanic/Latino as an ethnic category. This table excludes Latinos from the racial categories and assigns them to a separate category. Hispanics/Latinos may be of any race.
Race / Ethnicity (NH = Non-Hispanic)	Pop 2000	Pop 2010	Pop 2020	% 2000	% 2010	% 2020
White alone (NH)	984	682	434	74.43%	52.75%	37.97%
Black or African American alone (NH)	294	536	605	22.24%	41.45%	52.93%
Native American or Alaska Native alone (NH)	3	2	0	0.23%	0.15%	0.00%
Asian alone (NH)	4	12	16	0.30%	0.93%	1.40%
Pacific Islander alone (NH)	0	0	0	0.00%	0.00%	0.00%
Other Race alone (NH)	1	0	4	0.08%	0.00%	0.35%
Mixed race or Multiracial (NH)	25	24	58	1.89%	1.86%	5.07%
Hispanic or Latino (any race)	11	37	26	0.83%	2.86%	2.27%
Total	1,322	1,293	1,143	100.00%	100.00%	100.00%

Historical population
Census	Pop.	Note	%±
1940	139		—
1950	514		269.8%
1960	1,714		233.5%
1970	2,025		18.1%
1980	1,717		−15.2%
1990	1,404		−18.2%
2000	1,322		−5.8%
2010	1,293		−2.2%
2020	1,143		−11.6%
U.S. Decennial Census

=== 2010 census ===
At the 2010 census there were 1,293 people, 496 households, and 347 families living in the village. The population density was 3,153.7 inhabitants per square mile (1,217.7/km^{2}). There were 540 housing units at an average density of 1,317.1 per square mile (508.5/km^{2}). The racial makup of the village was 53.4% White, 42.2% African American, 0.2% Native American, 0.9% Asian, 1.1% from other races, and 2.2% from two or more races. Hispanic or Latino of any race were 2.9%.

Of the 496 households 35.3% had children under the age of 18 living with them, 39.9% were married couples living together, 24.4% had a female householder with no husband present, 5.6% had a male householder with no wife present, and 30.0% were non-families. 24.4% of households were one person and 9% were one person aged 65 or older. The average household size was 2.61 and the average family size was 3.08.

The median age in the village was 36.4 years. 25.2% of residents were under the age of 18; 9.1% were between the ages of 18 and 24; 27.4% were from 25 to 44; 26.2% were from 45 to 64; and 12.1% were 65 or older. The gender makeup of the village was 47.2% male and 52.8% female.

=== 2000 census ===
At the 2000 census there were 1,322 people, 494 households, and 345 families living in the village. The population density was 3,154.5 inhabitants per square mile (1,218.0/km^{2}). There were 521 housing units at an average density of 1,243.2 per square mile (480.0/km^{2}). The racial makup of the village was 74.96% White, 22.24% African American, 0.23% Native American, 0.30% Asian, 0.30% from other races, and 1.97% from two or more races. Hispanic or Latino of any race were 0.83%.

Of the 494 households 34.2% had children under the age of 18 living with them, 47.6% were married couples living together, 19.2% had a female householder with no husband present, and 30.0% were non-families. 24.3% of households were one person and 9.5% were one person aged 65 or older. The average household size was 2.68 and the average family size was 3.22.

The age distribution was 28.8% under the age of 18, 8.9% from 18 to 24, 28.7% from 25 to 44, 19.2% from 45 to 64, and 14.4% 65 or older. The median age was 35 years. For every 100 females, there were 90.8 males. For every 100 females age 18 and over, there were 87.8 males.

The median household income was $44,632 and the median income for a family was $49,375. Males had a median income of $34,500 versus $26,875 for females. The per capita income for the village was $25,723. About 8.1% of families and 9.1% of the population were below the poverty line, including 15.4% of those under age 18 and none of those age 65 or over.

== Education ==
All of it is in the Ferguson-Florissant School District.

Walnut Grove Elementary School of the Ferguson-Florissant School District is located in Calverton Park.

== Police ==
Calverton Park was served by the Calverton Park Police Department. The CPPD was dispatched by the neighboring city of Ferguson.

Calverton Park draws 66 percent of its revenue from fines and fees on the local population, which represents the highest percentage of any municipality in St. Louis County.

Calverton Park considers cars not on the road but having expired tags to be "safety hazards" and has entered private property to tow and impound such vehicles. This practice lead to a class-action lawsuit.

On August 1, 2024, the Calverton Park Police Department was dissolved and policing was taken over by the Florissant Police Department

== See also ==
- List of cities in Missouri
