= Berkeley High School (Missouri) =

High school in Berkeley, Missouri, United States

Information
- Type: Public high school
- Established: 1937
- Closed: 2003
- School district: Kinloch School District; Berkeley School District; Ferguson-Florissant School District
- Website: fergflor.k12.mo.us (archived)

Berkeley High School was a public high school in Berkeley, Missouri, United States. It was a part of the Kinloch School District, Berkeley School District, and the Ferguson-Florissant School District at different times. It closed in 2004.

== History ==
The Berkeley School District opened in 1937 for City of Berkeley students that previously attended the Kinloch High School, which had opened during that year. Initially a part of the Kinloch School District, the high school was renamed Berkeley High School.

The high school, located in what is now Berkeley, was originally exclusively for White students. However, those circumstances changed in 1964 with the closure of the Robertson, Missouri high school, located in a predominantly African American community. Occurring before the 'forced busing laws' of the late 1960s in the St. Louis area, the Berkeley School District voluntarily provided school bus transportation and welcomed the Robertson students into their system.

At a later point a new Berkeley High School campus opened in a new location, and the former Berkeley High School became Berkeley Middle School. On June 7, 1975, a U.S. district court ordered the Ferguson-Florissant School District to annex the Berkeley School District and the Kinloch School District; therefore the Ferguson-Florissant district began to serve Berkeley. In December 2003 the former Berkeley High School closed due to expansion of St. Louis Lambert International Airport. In January 2004, McCluer South-Berkeley High School opened.

== Notable alumni ==
- David L. Levin, politician
- Cedric the Entertainer, actor, comedian, and game show host
