= Olympic Club =

Athletic club and golf club in San Francisco

Coordinates: 37.709°N 122.495°W

- Interactive map of Olympic Club

Club information
- Location: San Francisco & San Mateo County, California, U.S.
- Established: 1860; 166 years ago
- Type: Private
- Total holes: 45
- Tournaments: U.S. Open (1955, 1966, 1987, 1998, 2012); U.S. Women's Open (2021); Tour Championship (1993, 1994); U.S. Amateur (1958, 1981, 2007, 2025); U.S. Junior Amateur (2004); U.S. Amateur Four-Ball (2015)
- Website: olyclub.com

Lake Course
- Designer: Sam Whiting; Willie Watson; Gil Hanse & Jim Wagner (2023 renovation)
- Par: 71 (70 for 2012 U.S. Open)
- Length: 7,170 yards (6,560 m) (2012 U.S. Open)
- Course rating: 76.5
- Slope rating: 145

Ocean Course
- Designer: Tom Weiskopf Jim Urbina (2026 renovation)
- Par: 71
- Length: 6,925 yards (6,332 m)
- Course rating: 73.2
- Slope rating: 131

Cliffs Course
- Designer: Jay Morrish; Tom Weiskopf Jim Urbina (2026 renovation)
- Par: 27
- Length: 1,800 yards (1,646 m)

The Olympic Club is an athletic club and private social club in San Francisco, California.

First named the "San Francisco Olympic Club", it was established on May 6, 1860. Its first officers were President, G.W. Bell, Secretary, E. Bonnell, Treasurer, H.G. Hanks, and Leader, Arthur Nahl.

Its main "City Clubhouse" is located in San Francisco's Union Square district, and its three golf courses are in the southwestern corner of the city, at the border with Daly City. The "Lakeside Clubhouse" is located just north of the Daly City border; the two clubhouses are separated by about 10 miles (16 km).

The three golf courses are named Lake, Ocean, and Cliffs. Lake and Ocean are 18-hole par-71 courses, and the Cliffs is a nine-hole par-3 course in the bluffs overlooking the Pacific Ocean. All three venues are lined with many trees and offer views of the Golden Gate Bridge and Golden Gate Park. The United States Golf Association recognizes the Olympic Club as one of the first 100 golf clubs established in the United States.

In November 2017, it was announced that Olympic Club would host the 2033 Ryder Cup.

== History ==
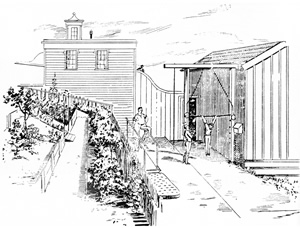
The Olympic Club, drawing by the Nahl Brothers, 1855

First named the "San Francisco Olympic Club", it is the oldest athletic club in the United States. Established on May 6, 1860, its first officers were President, G.W. Bell, Secretary, E. Bonnell, Treasurer, H.G. Hanks, and Leader, Arthur Nahl.

James J. Corbett, the heavyweight boxing champion from 1892 to 1897, joined the club in 1884. He later went on to coach boxing at the club for many years. On January 2, 1893 the club opened its first permanent clubhouse on Post Street. That building did not survive the San Francisco earthquake.

=== Women's Athletic Club ===
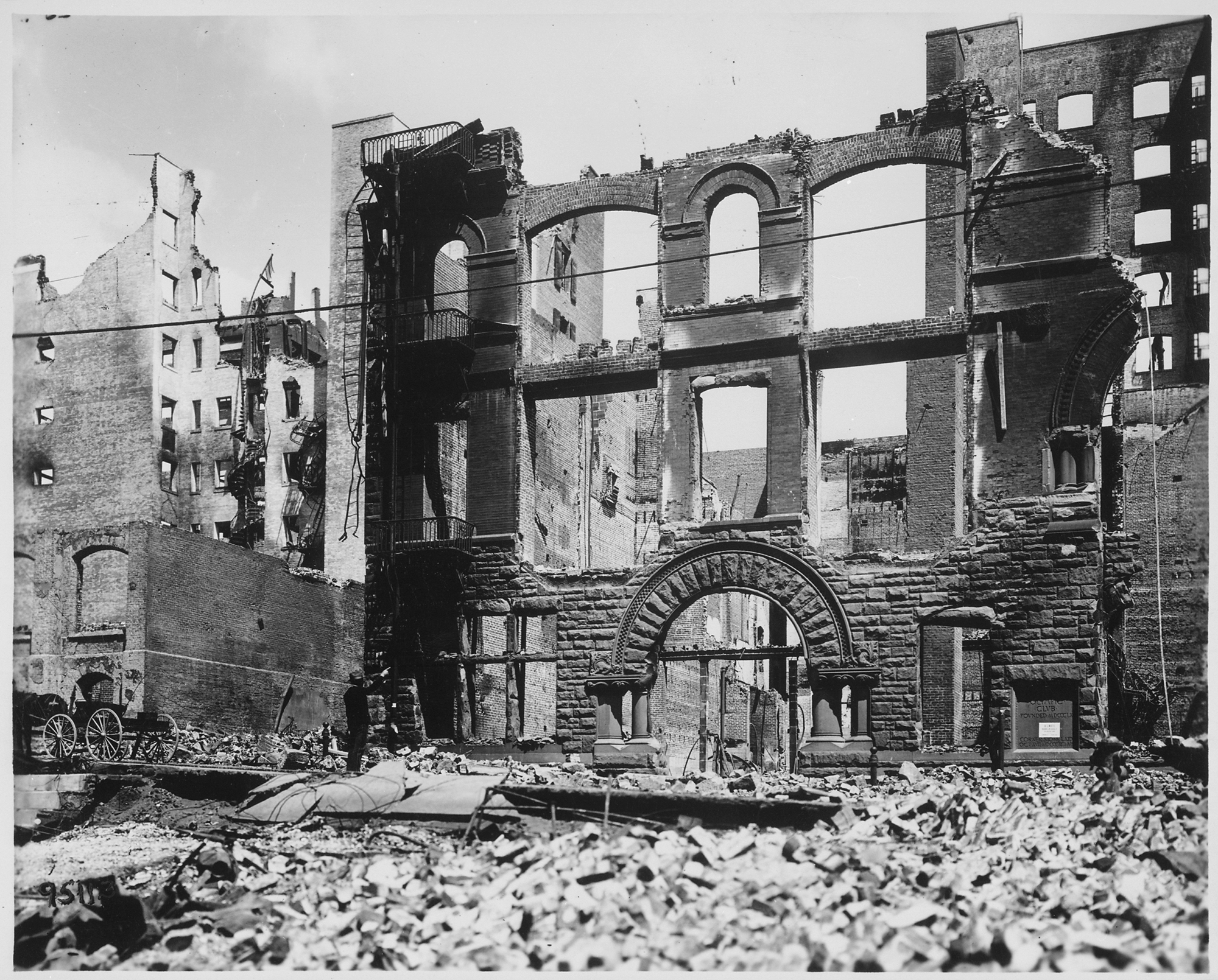
Ruins of the club, after the San Francisco Earthquake of 1906

Women who could not join the men-only Olympic Club built their own modest athletic club a few doors down, named the Women's Athletic Club of San Francisco. Begun in 1912 and completed in 1917, it provided many of the same facilities as the Olympic Club. In 1966, the Club changed its name to the Metropolitan Club of San Francisco. It may be found on Sutter St., in back of the Olympic Club's parking garage.

=== Discrimination lawsuit ===
In 1987, San Francisco City Attorney Louise Renne filed suit against the Olympic Club for discrimination against women and (allegedly) against minorities. Renne contended that the Club's lease of City-owned land upon which fell one hole of the Lake Course and two holes of the Ocean Course required them to conform to the City's anti-discrimination policies. Rather than face a protracted legal case with an uncertain outcome, the board voted to accept women as members in 1990.

=== Golf club ===
In 1918, the club took over the Lakeside Golf Club, which had just opened in 1917 but was struggling financially. Lakeside had one 18-hole golf course designed by Wilfrid Reid, but following additional land purchases the club decided to replace it with two courses. These were designed by Willie Watson, a well-known Scottish architect, and the Lake and Ocean courses opened in 1924. The Ocean course was shortly thereafter damaged by landslides, and Sam Whiting (who had constructed the two courses, and would remain as superintendent until 1954) remodeled and rebuilt both courses in 1927. In 1953, the Lake course was modified by Robert Trent Jones in preparation for the 1955 U.S. Open. The Ocean course was altered several times over the years, and following heavy storm damage in 1996 was completely redesigned by Tom Weiskopf and reopened in 2000.

The Cliffs Course opened in 1994 with Jay Morrish and Tom Weiskopf as the course architects.

The Olympic Club hosted the 2004 U.S. Junior Amateur (won by Sihwan Kim) and the U.S. Amateur in 1958 (won by Charles Coe) and 1981 (won by Nathaniel Crosby, son of Bing Crosby). The Lake and Ocean Courses were used for the 2007 U.S Amateur, won by Colt Knost, who earned a 2 and 1 victory over Michael Thompson.

=== Competition ===
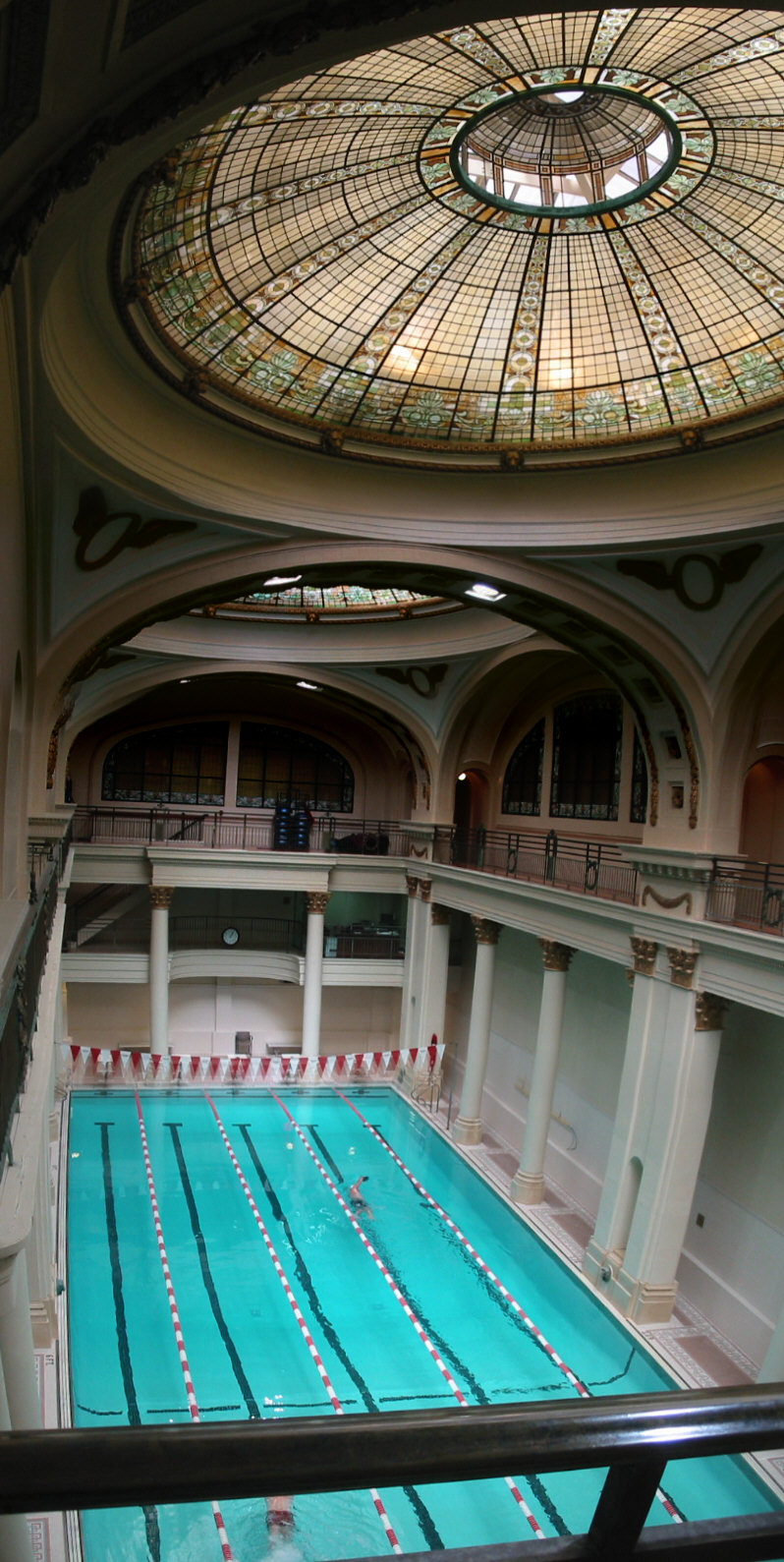
Olympic natatorium

In 1909, Olympian and club member Ralph Rose set a world record shot put throw of 51 feet (16 m).

In 1915, the club's amateur basketball team won the Amateur Athletic Union (AAU) Basketball Championship. In 1934, club member Fred Apostoli won the National Amateur Middleweight boxing title. In 1937, the Olympic Club track and field team won the Track and Field National Championships. In 1941, club member Hank Luisetti helped lead the Olympic Club basketball team to win the AAU Basketball Championships again. In 1950, Olympic Club member Arthur Larsen won the U.S. Open of tennis in Forest Hills, New York. The Olympic Club water polo team won the 1959 Water Polo National Championship.

Cycling is one of the sports with the longest tradition at the Olympic Club. From 1893 to 1903, the Olympic Club Cycling Team was one of the club's premier teams. Although the sanctioned cycling team disbanded in 1903, many Olympians participated in cycling on an individual basis. The most illustrious of these was Ernest Ohrt. Ohrt capped his cycling career by being named coach of the United States Olympic Games cycling team in 1924.

Beginning in the mid-1990s, a revived Olympic Club cycling team supported several cyclists who went on to become professional road cyclists. Former Olympic Club cyclists who later turned professional include Skyler Bishop, Nick Kelez, James Hibbard, Jackson Stewart, Mike Tillman and Zach Walker.

In addition to developing professional cyclists, the team also includes masters-age cyclists such as Brian McGuire, Hal Johnson, Cynthia Mommsen and Lisa Hunt.

Club member Maureen O'Toole won a silver medal in water polo at the 2000 Olympic Games in Sydney, Australia.

At least five Olympic Club members have won the Dipsea Race, which was founded by OC members: Oliver Millard in 1910 and 1913, Mason Hartwell in 1917, Norman Bright in 1970, Joe King in 1995 and 1996, and Shirley Matson in 1993.

In 1992, the Club set up the Winged "O" Foundation, which changed its name to The Olympic Club Foundation in 2002. Its purpose is to fund youth sports programs which primarily target less advantaged youth who live in the Bay Area.

=== Winged-O football and rugby ===
The Olympic Club fielded a football team that played Bay Area colleges such as Stanford, Cal, St. Mary's, and Santa Clara. The team was formed in 1890. That year, the Olympic Club was accused by a rival club of enticing athletes to jump to its ranks with offers of jobs. An investigation by the Amateur Athletic Union ruled that the Olympics' practice was not actually professionalism but only a "semi" form of it, thus inventing the term "semi-pro". Although the Amateur Athletic Union didn't like the idea very much, it decided that clubs could indeed offer employment without losing their amateur status or compromising the athlete. From 1891 through 1934, Olympic club had a 12-30-8 record against Stanford and a 6-49-5 record against Cal.

In 1926, Percy Locey played football at the Olympic Club. He was a member of the Olympic's "Winged-O" football eleven that handed the University of California's "Wonder Team" their first loss in five seasons. In 1928, Locey took over as the head football coach at the Olympic Club. In his first year with the Olympic Club, his team posted an undefeated season, with wins over future Pac-12 schools Stanford and 1929 Rose Bowl bound California. After the success of that season, Locey was promoted to head coach of all sports at the athletic club. He was named the coach of the West team in the annual East–West Shrine Game in 1929, though his team was defeated that year, 19-7.

Olympic Club members played a major part in the first All-Star football game. E. Jack Spaulding, the founder of the Shrine East-West football classic played, coached and was football commissioner of the Olympic Club. In 1925 the first game was played in San Francisco. Spaulding served as managing director of the first two games. An award in his name is presented each year at the game. O.E. "Babe" Hollingbery played for the club and was coach in 1925. He headed the selection process for the West team and served as the first Coach of the West team which defeated the East by a score of 6-0. He later had a long distinguished career as coach of the Washington State football team and coached in 18 Shrine games.

=== Rugby ===
Olympic Club fields a rugby team that participates in the Pacific Rugby Premiership and formerly in USA D1 and in the Rugby Super League. The Pacific Rugby Premiership (PRP) is the highest level domestic rugby competition in the U.S. Several players from Olympic Club have played for the U.S. national rugby team.

In 1913, the Olympic Club's rugby union team played the touring the New Zealand All Blacks, then as now the world top team in that sport. Olympic Club members later provided the core of the U.S. national team that won gold medals in rugby at the 1920 and 1924 Summer Olympics, the last occasion the sport was part of the Olympic program.

== City Clubhouse ==
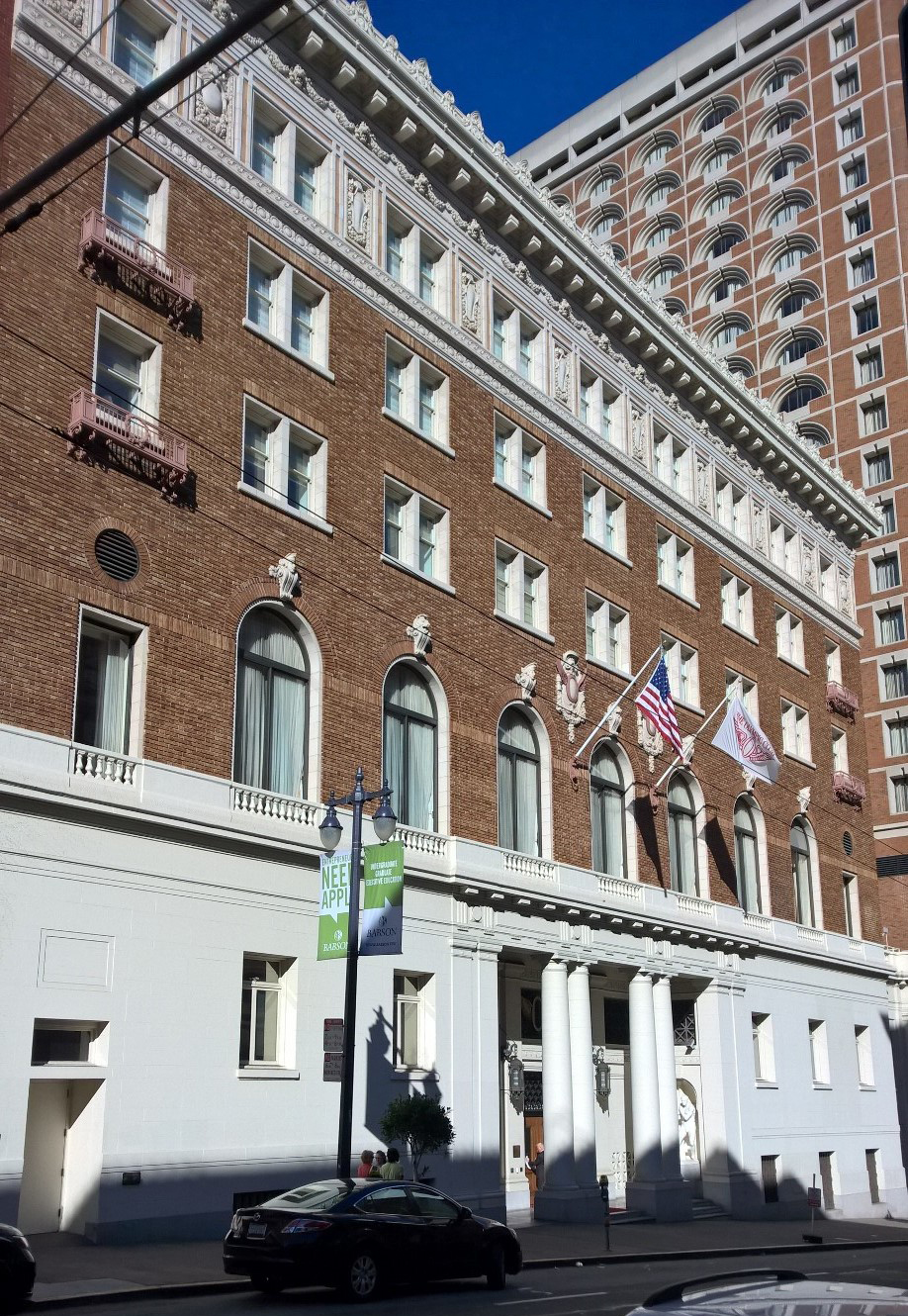
The Olympic Club's main entrance on Post Street

The Olympic Club's City Clubhouse is a masonry building on Post Street, two blocks west of Union Square in San Francisco, next door to the Bohemian Club and on the same block as the Marines Memorial Club. A garage (shared by the Marines Memorial Club) and separate entrance are on Sutter Street, on the north side of the block. The current clubhouse was built in 1912, after the first one was destroyed in the 1906 San Francisco earthquake. The clubhouse contains a pub, a dining room, meeting rooms, banquet rooms, guestrooms, a fitness center, a cardio solarium, handball and squash courts, circuit training facilities, two basketball courts, two swimming pools, and a rooftop deck.

== The courses ==
=== General course information ===
Bent grass covers the greens. The fairways are a rye and poa annua grass combination. The roughs also have a bit of bluegrass mixed in.

Setup for the 2007 U.S. Amateur Championship:

- The Lake Course played at 6,948 yards (6,353 m) and par 35-35=70. The Ocean Course, which was used for the first two days of stroke play only, played at 6,786 yards (6,205 m) and par 35-35=70.
- The Lake Course was set for green speeds of approximately 11 feet 6 inches (351 cm) on the Stimpmeter. The primary rough was grown to 4 inches (100 mm), with a strip of intermediate rough cut to 1.5 inches (38 mm) in height.
- The Lake Course carried a USGA Course Rating of 74.8 and a USGA Slope Rating of 143. The Ocean Course carried a USGA Course Rating of 74.0 and a USGA Slope Rating of 136.

=== The Lake Course ===
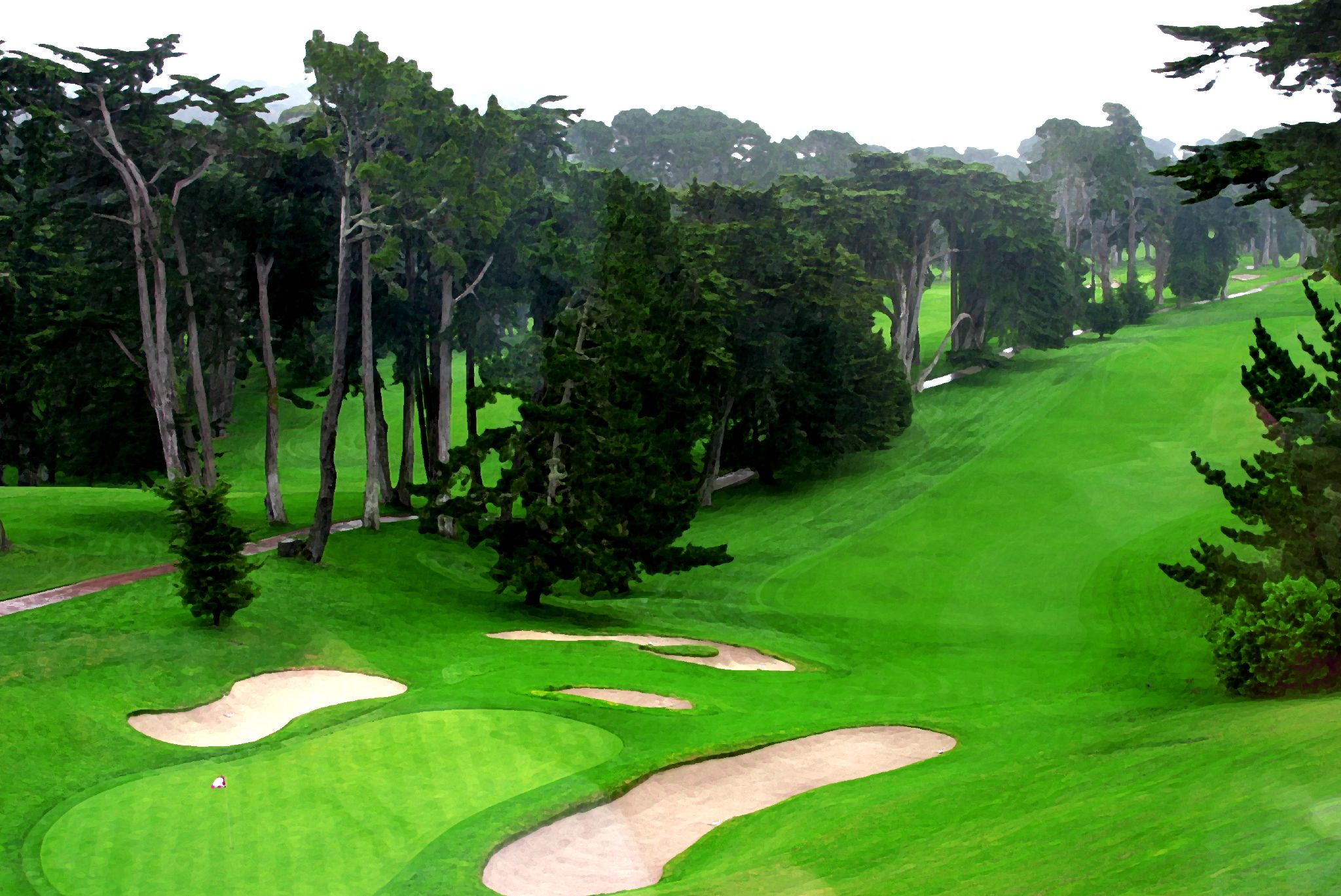
18th hole at the Lake Course

The Lake Course has been recognized by Golf Magazine in its list of the Top 100 Courses in the U.S. It has also been recognized in Golf Week's category of "America's 100 Best Classical Courses." In Golf Digest's list of the U.S. 100 Greatest Courses for 2021-2022, the Lake Course was ranked 34. It is almost entirely within the borders of San Francisco.

The yardage of the Lake Course is 7,060 yards (6,460 m) from the new championship tees, with a course rating of 75.7 and a slope rating of 143. From the next set of tees forward, the course measures 6,529 yards (5,970 m), and has a course rating of 72.3 and a slope rating of 132. From the next set of tees forward, the course measures 6,235 yards (5,701 m), and has a course rating of 70.9 and a slope rating of 129. From the front tees, the course measures 5,593 yards (5,114 m), and has a course rating of 68.6 and a slope rating of 122.

The Lake Course was lengthened to prepare for the 2007 U.S. Amateur and 2012 U.S. Open by architect Bill Love. Included in the improvements by Bill Love were new tees that have added significant length to the 2nd, 3rd, 5th, 6th, 9th, 12th, 13th and 16th holes. In addition, drastic changes were made to the par-4 seventh and par-3 eighth holes as part of the greens replacement project. A new two-tiered green at the seventh replaces the old three-level green constructed in the 1970s. This green is located approximately 20 yards (18 m) behind the old one. The most dramatic alterations were made at the par-3 8th. Previously just a short uphill pitch, a completely new hole has been built with a teeing area well back and to the right of the original, changing the angle of approach and pushing the length of the hole back to 200 yards (180 m). A new green has also been built at the par-3 15th. The controversial 18th green has also been changed further to reintroduce, in a more playable manner, the slope that was previously removed while at the same time creating more diversity in pin placements for the finishing hole. The new 7th and 8th holes opened for play in May 2009.

==== Scorecard ====
Tee	Rating/Slope	1	2	3	4	5	6	7	8	9	Out	10	11	12	13	14	15	16	17	18	In	Total
2012 U.S. Open	75.7 / 143	520	428	247	438	498	489	288	200	449	3557	424	430	451	199	419	154	670	522	344	3613	7170
Par		4	4	3	4	4	4	4	3	4	34	4	4	4	3	4	3	5	5	4	36	70
Black	75.0 / 142	533	418	229	430	457	439	294	181	439	3420	422	430	415	195	417	157	609	522	347	3514	6934
Blue	73.2 / 134	515	380	212	417	434	426	284	169	424	3261	395	414	399	180	402	142	579	491	334	3336	6597
White	71.7 / 130	500	367	198	396	420	415	263	154	382	3095	385	384	375	172	388	133	562	464	322	3185	6280
SI	Men's	13	5	11	3	1	7	17	15	9		10	4	8	16	6	18	2	14	12
Par	Men's	5	4	3	4	4	4	4	3	4	35	4	4	4	3	4	3	5	5	4	36	71
Par	Women's	5	4	3	4	5	5	4	3	5	38	4	5	4	3	5	3	5	5	4	38	76
SI	Women's	11	9	7	5	13	1	15	17	3		10	2	8	16	4	18	6	14	12
Green	68.6 / 123	455	286	185	296	328	380	241	115	350	2636	371	369	359	156	366	122	457	443	310	2953	5589

=== The Ocean Course ===
The Ocean Course has seen many changes over its history including a recent complete redesign and reconstruction in 2012 by architects Bill Love and Brian Kington. The Ocean Course's storied past includes winter El Niño storms in 1983, and 1997 that caused significant damage and required major changes to the course and layout. During the mid-1990s, the club built 4 holes west of Skyline Blvd. along the bluffs overlooking the Pacific Ocean. Holes of par 4, par 3, par 5, and par 4 had dramatic views, but these holes were severely eroded and fell victim to the 1997 storm. Prior to the recent 2012 renovation project the course had been rebuilt in 1999.

The regular yardage for the Ocean Course is 6,926 yards (6,333 m) from the Black Championship tees with a course rating of 73.6 and a slope rating of 136. From the Blue tees, the course measures 6,496 yards (5,940 m) and has a course rating of 71.1 and a slope rating of 129. From White tees, the course measures 5,896 yards (5,391 m) with a course rating of 68.8 and a slope rating of 121. From the Green tees, the course measures 5,386 yards (4,925 m) with a course rating of 66.5 and a slope rating of 115.

In preparation for the 2007 U.S. Amateur, the 14th hole was changed, to allow the 15th hole and driving range to be lengthened. The Ocean Course recently hosted the U.S.G.A. Amateur Four-ball Championships in May 2015.

==== Scorecard ====
Tee	Rating/Slope	1	2	3	4	5	6	7	8	9	Out	10	11	12	13	14	15	16	17	18	In	Total
Black	73.6 / 136	555	196	420	565	172	337	446	423	391	3505	184	546	395	365	396	475	438	207	414	3420	6925
Blue	71.1 / 129	535	176	382	544	161	306	431	396	377	3308	167	504	376	354	380	422	406	187	392	3188	6496
White	68.8 / 121	498	151	361	479	159	299	386	370	354	3057	144	454	353	318	333	389	352	170	328	2841	5898
SI	Men's	7	15	5	9	17	13	1	3	11		14	4	6	16	8	2	10	18	12
Par	Men's	5	3	4	5	3	4	4	4	4	36	3	5	4	4	4	4	4	3	4	35	71
Par	Women's	5	3	4	5	3	4	4	4	4	36	3	5	4	4	4	4	4	3	4	35	71
SI	Women's	3	17	5	11	15	13	7	1	9		18	4	6	16	10	2	8	14	12
Green	66.5 / 113	479	134	326	437	142	275	359	359	339	2850	120	433	313	292	249	355	343	113	318	2536	5386

=== The Cliffs Course ===
The 9-hole, par 3 Cliffs Course is the windiest because it is set on the bluffs above the Pacific Ocean. Though it is short, it is very challenging. Designed by Jay Morrish and Tom Weiskopf, it is the most scenic of all three courses. It measures 1,800 yards (1,600 m).

== Major tournaments held at the Olympic Club ==
=== U.S. Open ===
The Olympic Club has hosted five U.S. Opens (1955, 1966, 1987, 1998, 2012); the 54-hole leader failed to win all five times.

Jack Fleck won in 1955, defeating Ben Hogan in an 18-hole playoff after the two were tied at the end of 72 holes on 287. Billy Casper defeated Arnold Palmer in another playoff to win in 1966 and Scott Simpson won in 1987 by one shot over Tom Watson.

Lee Janzen won in 1998 with an even-par score of 280. Players complained about the questionable pin position at the 18th hole in the second round; it was set at the top of a ridge, and many balls rolled on far beyond the cup. Kirk Triplett incurred a two-stroke penalty when he used his putter to stop the ball from rolling. Payne Stewart, the runner-up to Janzen, complained as he three-putted the hole. The green was flattened around 2000 as a result, but was given more slope in the recent renovation to the course.

The 2012 U.S. Open was won by Webb Simpson when he made four birdies over the last thirteen holes. This U.S. Open was part of three sports championships involving San Francisco that year, along with the Giants' World Series victory and the 49ers' sixth Super Bowl appearance.

Year	Winner	Score	Margin of victory	Runner(s)-up
2012	(United States) Webb Simpson	281 (+1)	1 stroke	(Northern Ireland) Graeme McDowell (United States) Michael Thompson
1998	(United States) Lee Janzen	280 (E)	1 stroke	(United States) Payne Stewart
1987	(United States) Scott Simpson	277 (−3)	1 stroke	(United States) Tom Watson
1966	(United States) Billy Casper	278 (−2)	Playoff	(United States) Arnold Palmer
1955	(United States) Jack Fleck	287 (+7)	Playoff	(United States) Ben Hogan

=== PGA Championship ===
The Olympic Club is scheduled to host its first PGA Championship in 2028.

=== U.S. Women's Open ===
The Olympic Club has hosted one U.S. Women's Open, in 2021.

Year	Winner	Score	Margin of victory	Runner-up
2021	(Philippines) Yuka Saso	280 (−4)	Playoff	(Japan) Nasa Hataoka

=== Ryder Cup ===
In November 2017, the PGA of America announced that the Olympic Club's Lake Course will host the 2028 PGA Championship and the 2033 Ryder Cup. It will be the first Ryder Cup for northern California and the first held on the west coast since 1959 at Indian Wells, California.

=== The Tour Championship ===
The Olympic Club has hosted the PGA Tour's season-ending event, The Tour Championship, twice, in 1993 and 1994.

Year	Winner	Score	Margin of victory	Runner(s)-up
1994	(United States) Mark McCumber	274 (−10)	Playoff	(United States) Fuzzy Zoeller
1993	(United States) Jim Gallagher Jr.	277 (−7)	1 stroke	(South Africa) David Frost (United States) John Huston (Australia) Greg Norman (United States) Scott Simpson

=== U.S. Amateur ===
The Olympic Club has hosted four U.S. Amateurs, in 1958, 1981, 2007, and 2025.

Year	Winner	Result	Runner-up
2025	(United States) Mason Howell	7 & 6	(United States) Jackson Herrington
2007	(United States) Colt Knost	2 & 1	(United States) Michael Thompson
1981	(United States) Nathaniel Crosby	37 holes	(United States) Brian Lindley
1958	(United States) Charles Coe	5 & 4	(United States) Tommy Aaron

=== U.S. Women's Amateur ===
The USGA announced that The Olympic Club will host the 2030 U.S. Women's Amateur.

=== U.S. Junior Amateur ===
The Olympic Club has hosted one U.S. Junior Amateur, in 2004.

Year	Winner	Result	Runner-up
2004	(South Korea) Sihwan Kim	1 up	(United States) David Chung

== See also ==
- List of American gentlemen's clubs
- Olympic Club Foundation
