= Olympic Club Foundation =

- Formation: 1992
- Founder: Olympic Club
- Registration no.: 94-3160462
- Legal status: Non-profit organization
- Purpose: Support and encourage participation by Bay Area youth in amateur athletics.
- Headquarters: San Francisco, CA
- Location: 524 Post Street, San Francisco, CA 94102
- Region served: San Francisco Bay Area
- Services: Fostering Amateur Athletic Competitions
- Revenue: $980,997 (2015)
- Expenses: $906,067 (2015)
- Staff: Rebecca Figone, Executive Director
- Website: The Olympic Club Foundation
- Formerly called: The Winged "O" Foundation

The Olympic Club Foundation is a United States 501(c)(3) public charity fostering amateur sports competition. The Foundation was established in San Francisco, California in 1992 and provides support for athletic programs for disadvantaged Bay Area youth. The Olympic Club Foundation is the philanthropic arm of the Olympic Club.

== Early roots in Olympic Club ==
According to the Olympic Club's official website, "giving back to the community is a tradition that has endured since the Olympic Club's earliest days." The Olympic Club has a long history of philanthropy, dating back to its origins in 1860. In December of that year, the Club held its first public exhibition, in Pratt's Hall on Montgomery Street, San Francisco, California for the benefit of a young ladies seminary. During the American Civil War years, fund-raising events were held in support of the war effort. One of the most noteworthy was one which netted over $1,000 for the Sanitary Commission.

In 1914, in the spirit of public service, the Olympic Club minstrels came to the rescue of the San Francisco Associated Charities, whose coffers were empty, and raised $20,000 through three brilliant performances at the Savoy Theatre. In 1917, the Club donated 10% of its net revenue for the duration of the First World War to the San Francisco chapter of the American Red Cross. Similar charitable activities were undertaken during World War II.

The Olympic Club has also generously supported its own athletes in international competition. For example, for the 1924 Olympics, the Club sent 22 athletes to Paris and had the distinction of placing more athletes on competing United States teams than any other organization or institution. Throughout its history, the Club has been a strong promoter of athletic programs for young athletes and provided financial support through an informal "athletes fund" for those with potential for international Olympics competition.

=== Formation of the Foundation ===
The Club's role in philanthropy was formalized in February 1992 with the creation of the Olympic Club Foundation, which was initially called "The Winged "O" Foundation." There were seven original directors, all members in good standing of the Club. The Board of Directors adopted the following mission statement:

"To grant funds and support programs that share the belief that participation in organized athletics enriches young lives and develops future community leaders."

The Foundation was initially capitalized by the Club with a $25,000 grant. The Board was to use this initial seed capital to increase the Foundation's resources and grant making capacity.

In 2000, the name of the Foundation was officially changed from "The Winged "O" Foundation" to "The Olympic Club Foundation" to facilitate the recognition of the OCF as the philanthropic arm of The Olympic Club.

== Fundraising & events ==
For the first major event, Board members decided to hold a charity golf tournament. It was also decided to offer non-Olympians the opportunity to play the Club's renowned courses. The Foundation's Board proceeded to publicize the event and recruit participants and sponsors.

The first Foundation golf tournament was held in 1994 and was very successful, attracting a full field of players from all over the country and raising $100,000 for the Foundation. Ever since that time, the Foundation's two annual "Classic" golf tournaments have provided the majority of the Foundation's grant funds.

In 1995, an annual fundraising campaign was initiated, specifically targeting the Olympic Club membership. Beginning in 2002, a silent auction to benefit the Foundation was added to the annual tennis banquet. Other sports have held events to benefit the Foundation. In 2004, a Planned Giving program was initiated.

== Staff ==
Most of the Foundation's work is done by volunteers, whom a small staff supports. In addition, over the years, a small portion of the money raised has been placed in an endowment fund, which has grown along with the Foundation. The endowment is used primarily to generate income to support the OCF's administrative costs, assuring that the vast majority of donated funds go directly to support youth athletic programs.

== Purpose & mission ==
The Olympic Club Foundation's byline is "Giving Wings to Youth". Most of the Foundation's grants target disadvantaged youth growing up in challenged neighborhoods.

The Foundation's grants are intended to help young athletes learn very important lifelong lessons. The Foundation believes that it is through competition on the athletic field, on the golf courses, on the tennis courts, in the pool, on the track, on the squash, handball and racquetball courts, on the gymnasium floor and in other athletic venues that kids first learn about commitment, sportsmanship, fair play, teamwork, leadership and trust.

The Foundation funds capital projects such as the refurbishing of the Ernest Ingold swimming pool in the Haight Ashbury district of San Francisco, the resurfacing of the tennis courts at Golden Gate Park, and the creation and/or refurbishing of school playgrounds throughout the Bay Area. The Foundation also funds sports programs, such as after-school basketball leagues in Oakland and Alameda County, a girls soccer team in San Mateo County, the First Tee Program for junior golfers, San Francisco Little League, and the Junior Giants. The Foundation also funds the purchase of needed sports equipment such as uniforms, bats, balls, nets, scoreboards, etc.

== Awards & scholarships ==
When a young Olympian, Brian Ohleyer, lost his life in a tragic traffic accident, the Foundation established the Brian Ohleyer Award in his honor. This annual award recognizes Bay Area youngsters who demonstrate the high academic and athletic ideals exemplified by Brian's life and also find time to contribute through community service. The Ohleyer Award is presented annually and includes both scholarship funds for the recipient as well as a contribution to the school from which he or she is chosen.

In 2003, the Foundation officially created an "Athletes Fund" as a separate and special part of its grants program, through which it provides support to outstanding young athletes who have demonstrated their potential to develop into national and international champions in their respective sports. This continues the tradition started by the Club in its earliest days to help outstanding young athletes realize their full potential.

== Impact ==
Since inception, the Foundation estimates that 60,000 Bay Area youth have benefited in some way from its grants. Each year the Foundation has increased its grant budget in order to increase its impact. The Foundation has set a goal for itself of granting $1 million a year by the year 2012.
