= Norwood Township, St. Louis County, Missouri =

Township in St. Louis County, Missouri, U.S.

Coordinates: 38°43′55″N 90°17′7″W

Norwood Township is a township in St. Louis County, in the U.S. state of Missouri. Its population was 33,914 as of the 2010 census.
