= Ferguson Township, St. Louis County, Missouri =

Township in the U.S. state of Missouri

Coordinates: 38°44′54″N 90°22′04″W

Ferguson Township is a township in St. Louis County, in the U.S. state of Missouri. Its population was 34,923 as of the 2010 census.
