= Kinloch, Missouri =

- City
- City of Kinloch
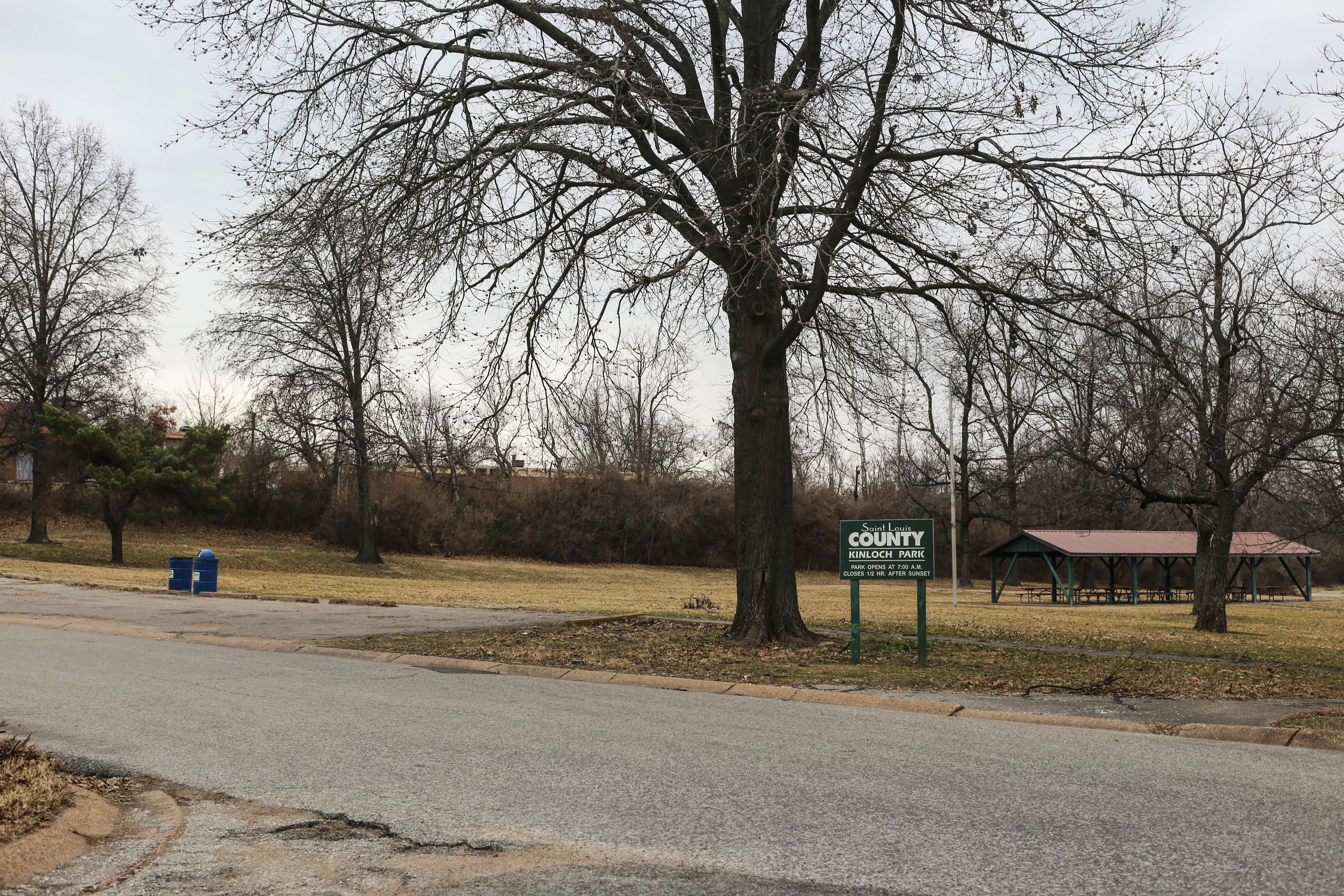
- Kinloch Park

- Coordinates: 38°44′18″N 90°19′30″W
- Country: United States
- State: Missouri
- County: St. Louis
- Founded: November 17, 1890

Government
  - Type: Mayor–council government
  - City manager: Justine Blue
  - Mayor: Evelyn Carter
  - Fire chief: Kevin Stewart

Area
  - Total: 0.73 sq mi (1.88 km^{2})
  - Land: 0.73 sq mi (1.88 km^{2})
  - Water: 0 sq mi (0.00 km^{2})
- Elevation: 574 ft (175 m)

Population (2020)
  - Total: 263
  - Density: 361.9/sq mi (139.72/km^{2})
- Time zone: UTC-6 (Central (CST))
  - Summer (DST): UTC-5 (CDT)
- FIPS code: 29-38972
- GNIS feature ID: 2395541
- Website: City of Kinloch

Kinloch is a city in St. Louis County, Missouri. The population was 263 as of the 2020 census.

The oldest African-American community to be incorporated in Missouri, Kinloch was home to a vibrant and flourishing Black community for much of the 19th and 20th century. It began to decline in the 1980s, when St. Louis began to buy up property due to an FAA noise-abatement program for nearby St. Louis Lambert International Airport. Between 1990 and 2000, Kinloch lost more than 80 percent of its population, and the city became an increasingly violent and dangerous place to live. In recent years, there have been efforts to rebuild the city.

== History ==
The current city of Kinloch grew up around Kinloch Park, a commuter suburb first developed in the 1890s.

A Mrs. "B" and her husband are thought to be the first black family to purchase a home in Kinloch Park. As soon as the neighbors discovered the new owners were black they sold their properties, and new sales to permanent white residents of south Kinloch Park ceased. In a few years, more than 30 black families had bought into a six-block area that became called South Kinloch Park.

Kinloch, as an African-American community, developed out of a land purchase model similar to the Brooklyn, Illinois model. Since it was not legal to sell directly to blacks, the Olive Street Terrace Realty Corporation sold the parcels to whites for an average price of $150. The new owners then sold the plots to Blacks for an average of $350. This allowed the company to use the white people's loans as collateral for further bank notes. To get white investors, the company circulated testimonials of investors who paid in $50 towards a parcel and received returns of $500 to $1,000 on the investment. In an advertisement to the Argus, Olive Street Terrace Realty said, "The good colored people of South Kinloch Park have built themselves a little city of which they have a right to be proud. More than a hundred homes, three churches and a splendid public school have been built in a few years."

The Kinloch Park development had a horse-racing facility called Kinloch Track. When Missouri outlawed the sport, the grounds were taken over by Kinloch Airfield, which saw some historic flights. The Aero Club of St. Louis hosted the first international air meet in October 1910, where Theodore Roosevelt became the first U.S. president to fly in an airplane. Pilot Arch Hoxsey flew the president around for over three minutes in a Wright Brothers plane they had brought in.

The Kinloch Airfield saw the first control tower, the first meal served on a flight, the first airmail shipped, the first parachute jump, the first aerial photo and the first animal airlifted. Albert Bond Lambert, the first person in the St. Louis area to receive a pilot's license, and fellow members of the Aero Club leased the field in 1920 and renamed it the Lambert-St. Louis Flying Field in 1923. Two years later, Lambert purchased the field outright; on February 7, 1928, he sold it to the city of St. Louis at cost, allowing it to become the first city-operated airport and the precursor of today's Lambert-St. Louis International Airport.

Kinloch was home to the 198th chapter of the Universal Negro Improvement Association UNIA, which fostered black-owned businesses in the area. The chapter chairman was Elijah Woodson.

In 1902, the white residents of Kinloch Park decided to withdraw from the neighboring Ferguson school district and built the Nuroad school for whites. Their two-room school was given to black students, who were using the 1885 Vernon schoolhouse built for the children of the servants to the whites in Kinloch. In 1913, the Dunbar Elementary school, named after Paul Laurence Dunbar, was established for the black children of South Kinloch. Still segregated when it closed in 1975, it holds the record as the longest-operated school for blacks only.

In 1924, Kinloch became the first community in Missouri to elect a black man to its school board: the Reverend Walter Johnson, who later became a vocal critic of Kinloch's refusal to build a high school for its black students.

Another Vernon School opened in 1927 to educate the black students of Kinloch and west Ferguson. Although the U.S. Supreme Court had ordered desegregation in 1954, the school remained segregated until it closed in 1967. Even though the Kinloch schools remained segregated, the Kinloch students took part in a court-ordered busing program to desegregate other school districts.

In 1931, Holy Angels Parish was established and opened Our Lady of the Angels Elementary School. A new, updated church was built in 1952. Both the church and school were open until 2002, making it the oldest continuing black parish in the St. Louis Archdiocese.

In 1938, South Kinloch was poised to elect a second black board member, with a district that was 543 Black students to 349 whites. This was when the white north put on the ballot an attempt to split the school district. This third attempt to divide the district by the protesting and minority whites who attended Nuroad School ended in failure, with 415 unanimous votes against in the black south and 215 unanimous votes for in the white north. This led to the foundation of a new municipality called Berkeley, which included all of North Kinloch Park plus land to the northwest and which formed a new school district. South Kinloch Park became Kinloch.

One all-but-forgotten element in Kinloch's success was the electric streetcar line which ran through it to Florissant. Later the line was cut back to just north of Airport Road in Berkeley. At Kinloch, near the beginning of the 1900s, a branch had been constructed to downtown Ferguson, connecting at what was known as various times as Ramona Junction and Ferguson Junction. This clean, economic and efficient transportation gave Kinloch residents the ability to travel with ease to jobs both in the City of St. Louis and the northwestern suburbs. At the Wellston Loop, the line connected with numerous other streetcar and bus lines, giving Kinloch residents a reliable way to get to downtown St. Louis and the suburbs of University City, Clayton, Brentwood, Kirkwood, and Webster Groves–as well as communities along St. Charles Rock Road west to St. Charles. Many white people became acquainted with Kinloch as they passed through the area on their streetcar journeys. The substation at the junction of the Berkeley and Ferguson branches still sits on the east side of Hanley Road opposite Suburban Avenue, which had been the streetcar right-of-way into Ferguson. In a heavy segregated culture, black and white rode the streetcars as equals. Anyone could sit wherever anyone wanted and it was not unusual for blacks and whites who otherwise would never have known each other to strike up conversations. In summer streetcar riders always commented on the tantalizing smoky breeze of barbecuing at the Kinloch stop, where the trolleys to Ferguson paused on a graceful, wide curve.

=== Decline and revitalization efforts ===
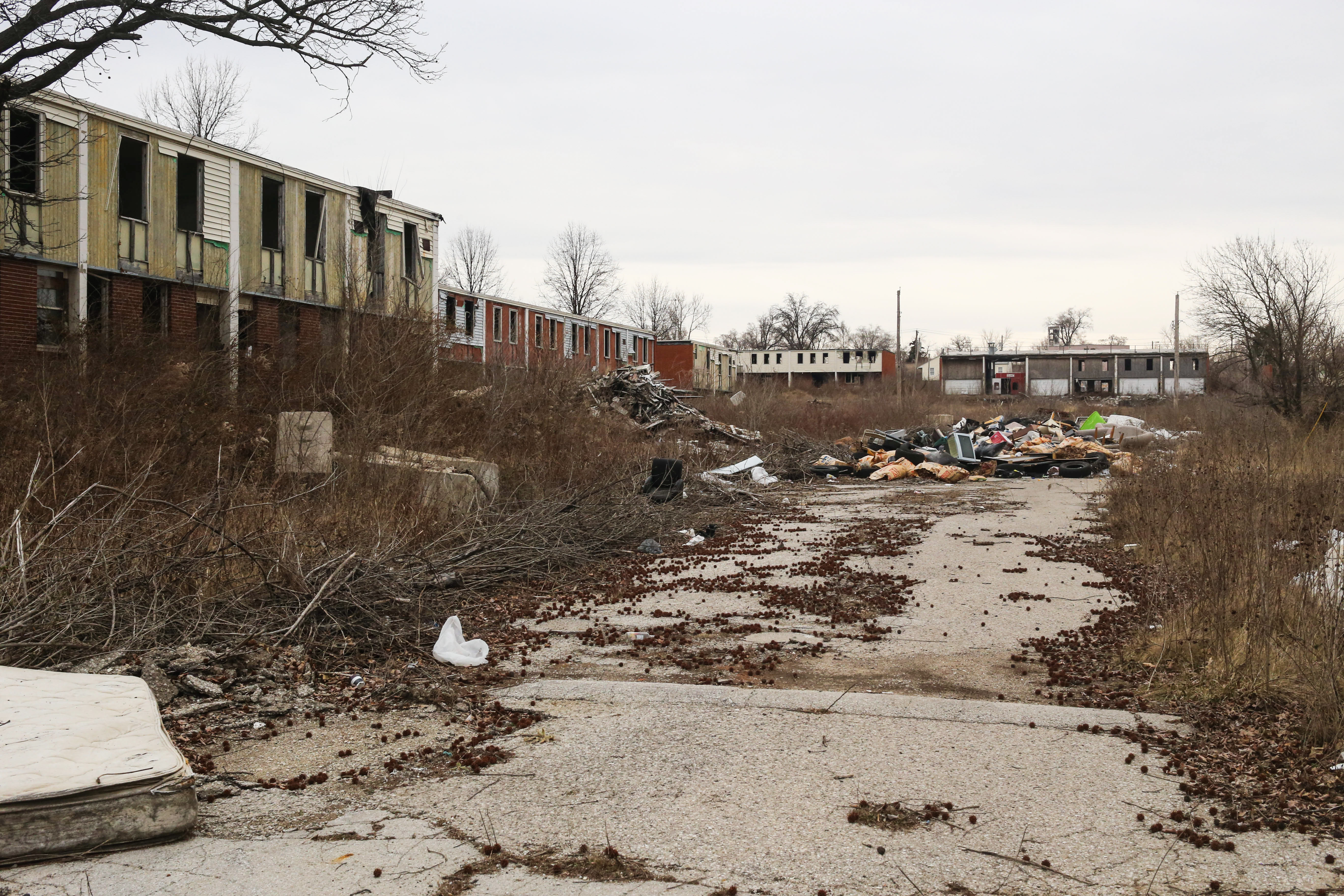
Kinloch, Missouri in 2017.

In the 1980s, the City of St. Louis began to buy out property in Kinloch as part of a noise-abatement program for Lambert-St. Louis International Airport. Eventually, the airport took the vast majority of private homes in Kinloch. Between 1990 and 2000, Kinloch lost more than 75 percent of its population. The social and economic effects of this buyout were disastrous for the community.

Kinloch became an increasingly violent and dangerous place to live, infested with drugs and crime. The police department faced numerous investigations, and over a 20-year period a number of officers were arrested on corruption charges. In September 2002, St. Louis County police chief Ron Battelle directed his department to take control of law enforcement in Kinloch. The city's population had dwindled to 449, and there was talk of disincorporation, which was renewed in 2011, when Mayor Keith Conway faced federal charges for using city funds to pay for personal expenses, including a vacation home in Florida.

In recent years, there have been efforts to rebuild the city. Faith Beyond Walls, a community service organization, has been instrumental in mobilizing volunteers to assist with these efforts.

The City of St. Louis, St. Louis County, Kinloch, Berkeley and Ferguson reached agreement on a redevelopment plan for 600 acres (240 ha) of land on the northeast corner of I-70 and I-170, along the eastern edge of the airport. Years ago, this land was part of the airport buyout. The redevelopment will offer office, retail, and industrial space and is expected to create about 12,000 jobs, along with tax revenue to be split among the municipalities. The developers, NorthPark Partners, intend to make improvements in Kinloch and donate a new civic center to Kinloch.

=== 2015 election rejection ===
On April 23, 2015, newly elected mayor Betty McCray was refused entrance to City Hall on the first day of her term. Members of the previous administration claimed voter fraud and that she had been suspended according to the city attorney. Eventually she was allegedly served with impeachment papers. The impeachment hearing was canceled in June 2015, leading McCray to file suit in St. Louis County Circuit Court, asking Judge John D. Warner to require the city to dismiss the impeachment proceeding and to provide access to her office in Kinloch City Hall, as well as barring the city attorney James Robinson from prosecuting her.

== Public safety ==
Since October 1, 2018 the City of Kinloch is patrolled by the St. Louis County Police Department, replacing the Kinloch Police Department. In 2016, local media reported that Kinloch used donated police cars that it did not register or insure, and operated without paying into the state's workers' compensation fund, making officers injured on the job were responsible for their own medical bills.

The City of Kinloch has been served by the Kinloch Fire Protection District since April 1944. The Kinloch Fire Protection District is a single-house combination fire service, with one Pumper and a Pumper-Tanker. Prior to 2021 the District was served only by their now Pumper-Tanker, when the District's Pumper was unavailable they were covered by the neighboring Ferguson Fire Department. In mid-May 2021, the Kinloch Fire Protection District welcomed its new Rescue Pumper "Roy" into service.

== Notable people ==
- Barrett Brooks, professional football player
- Roy Clay, Silicon Valley pioneer
- Jenifer Lewis, American film and television actress
- Ann Peebles, American recording artist
- Maxine Waters, California congresswoman
- Huey, American rapper and recording artist

== Geography ==
According to the United States Census Bureau, the city has a total area of 0.73 square miles (1.89 km^{2}), all land.

== Demographics ==
Historical population
Census	Pop.	Note	%±
1950	5,957		—
1960	6,501		9.1%
1970	5,629		−13.4%
1980	4,455		−20.9%
1990	2,702		−39.3%
2000	449		−83.4%
2010	298		−33.6%
2020	263		−11.7%
U.S. Decennial Census

=== 2020 census ===
Kinloch city, Missouri – Racial and ethnic composition Note: the US Census treats Hispanic/Latino as an ethnic category. This table excludes Latinos from the racial categories and assigns them to a separate category. Hispanics/Latinos may be of any race.
Race / Ethnicity (NH = Non-Hispanic)	Pop 2000	Pop 2010	Pop 2020	% 2000	% 2010	% 2020
White alone (NH)	8	10	78	1.78%	3.36%	29.66%
Black or African American alone (NH)	430	282	147	95.77%	94.63%	55.89%
Native American or Alaska Native alone (NH)	3	1	1	0.67%	0.34%	0.38%
Asian alone (NH)	1	2	7	0.22%	0.67%	2.66%
Native Hawaiian or Pacific Islander alone (NH)	0	0	0	0.00%	0.00%	0.00%
Other race alone (NH)	0	0	2	0.00%	0.00%	0.76%
Mixed race or Multiracial (NH)	4	3	10	0.89%	1.01%	3.80%
Hispanic or Latino (any race)	3	0	18	0.67%	0.00%	6.84%
Total	449	298	263	100.00%	100.00%	100.00%

=== 2010 census ===
As of the census of 2010, there were 298 people, 105 households, and 67 families residing in the city. The population density was 408.2 inhabitants per square mile (157.6/km^{2}). There were 177 housing units at an average density of 242.5 per square mile (93.6/km^{2}). The racial makeup of the city was 94.6% African American, 3.4% white, 0.3% Native American, 0.7% Asian, and 1.0% from two or more races.

There were 105 households, of which 36.2% had children under the age of 18 living with them, 19.0% were married couples living together, 31.4% had a female householder with no husband present, 13.3% had a male householder with no wife present, and 36.2% were non-families. 32.4% of all households were made up of individuals, and 8.6% had someone living alone who was 65 years of age or older. The average household size was 2.84 and the average family size was 3.63.

The median age in the city was 31.8 years. 31.9% of residents were under the age of 18; 9.8% were between the ages of 18 and 24; 21.8% were from 25 to 44; 29.8% were from 45 to 64; and 6.7% were 65 years of age or older. The gender makeup of the city was 46.6% male and 53.4% female.

=== 2000 census ===
As of the census of 2000, there were 449 people, 157 households, and 116 families residing in the city. The population density was 616.5 inhabitants per square mile (238.0/km^{2}). There were 231 housing units at an average density of 317.2 per square mile (122.5/km^{2}). The racial makeup of the city was 96.4% African American, 1.8% white, 0.7% Native American, 0.2% Asian, and 0.9% from two or more races. Hispanic or Latino of any race were 0.7% of the population.

There were 157 households, out of which 37.6% had children under the age of 18 living with them, 14.0% were married couples living together, 50.3% had a female householder with no husband present, and 26.1% were non-families. 24.8% of all households were made up of individuals, and 8.3% had someone living alone who was 65 years of age or older. The average household size was 2.86 and the average family size was 3.39.

In the city the population was spread out, with 38.3% under the age of 18, 11.1% from 18 to 24, 21.4% from 25 to 44, 20.5% from 45 to 64, and 8.7% who were 65 years of age or older. The median age was 26 years. For every 100 females, there were 98.7 males. For every 100 females age 18 and over, there were 84.7 males.

The median income for a household in the city was $10,156, and the median income for a family was $11,875. Males had a median income of $22,500 versus $12,031 for females. The per capita income for the city was $8,798. About 77.5% of families and 81.5% of the population were below the poverty line, including 82.9% of those under age 18 and 26.9% of those age 65 or over.

In 2015, press reports indicated the average lifespan in mostly-Black Kinloch is thirty years less than in mostly-white Wildwood.

== Education ==
The city is contained entirely within the Ferguson-Florissant School District.
