= Allen Lincoln =

American football/basketball player and coach

Biographical details
- Born: c. 1901; St. Louis, Missouri, U.S.
- Died: September 15, 1987 (aged 85–86); Nashville, Tennessee, U.S.
- Education: University of Missouri

Playing career

Football
- 1920: Missouri
- Position: Fullback

Coaching career (HC unless noted)

Basketball
- 1932–1938: Sewanee

Football
- 1931–1938: Sewanee (assistant)

Head coaching record
- Overall: 13–85

Allen George Lincoln (c. 1901 – September 15, 1987) was a college football and basketball player and coach. He coached the Sewanee Tigers basketball team. He played for the Missouri Tigers, and is a member of the Webster Groves High School All-Century team. He scored 46 points in a 76–0 victory over long-time rival Kirkwood on Thanksgiving Day, 1917.
