= Webster Groves School District =

School district in Missouri, United States

Coordinates: 38.590679°N 90.348170°W

Location
- Webster Groves, Missouri St. Louis County United States
- Coordinates: 38.590679, -90.348170

District information
- Type: Local school district
- Grades: K-12
- Superintendent: Jana Parker
- Schools: 10
- Budget: $62,800,000 (2015-16)
- NCES District ID: 2931530

Students and staff
- Students: 4683 (2018-19)
- Teachers: 315.50 FTE
- Staff: 56.26 FTE
- Student–teacher ratio: 14.84
- Athletic conference: Suburban XII (South Division)
- District mascot: Statesmen
- Colors: Orange and Black

Other information
- Website: www.webster.k12.mo.us

The Webster Groves School District is a public school district in and around Webster Groves, Missouri, west of St. Louis.

The current superintendent is Dr. Jana Parker, and the district's central office is located at 400 E. Lockwood Ave, Webster Groves, MO 63119. The district serves a community of approximately 32,000 includes many business, academic, and professional persons.

== Boundary ==
The district is completely inclusive to the municipalities of Webster Groves and Rock Hill, and partially inclusive to Warson Woods, Glendale and Shrewsbury.

== Schools ==
=== High school ===
==== Webster Groves High School ====
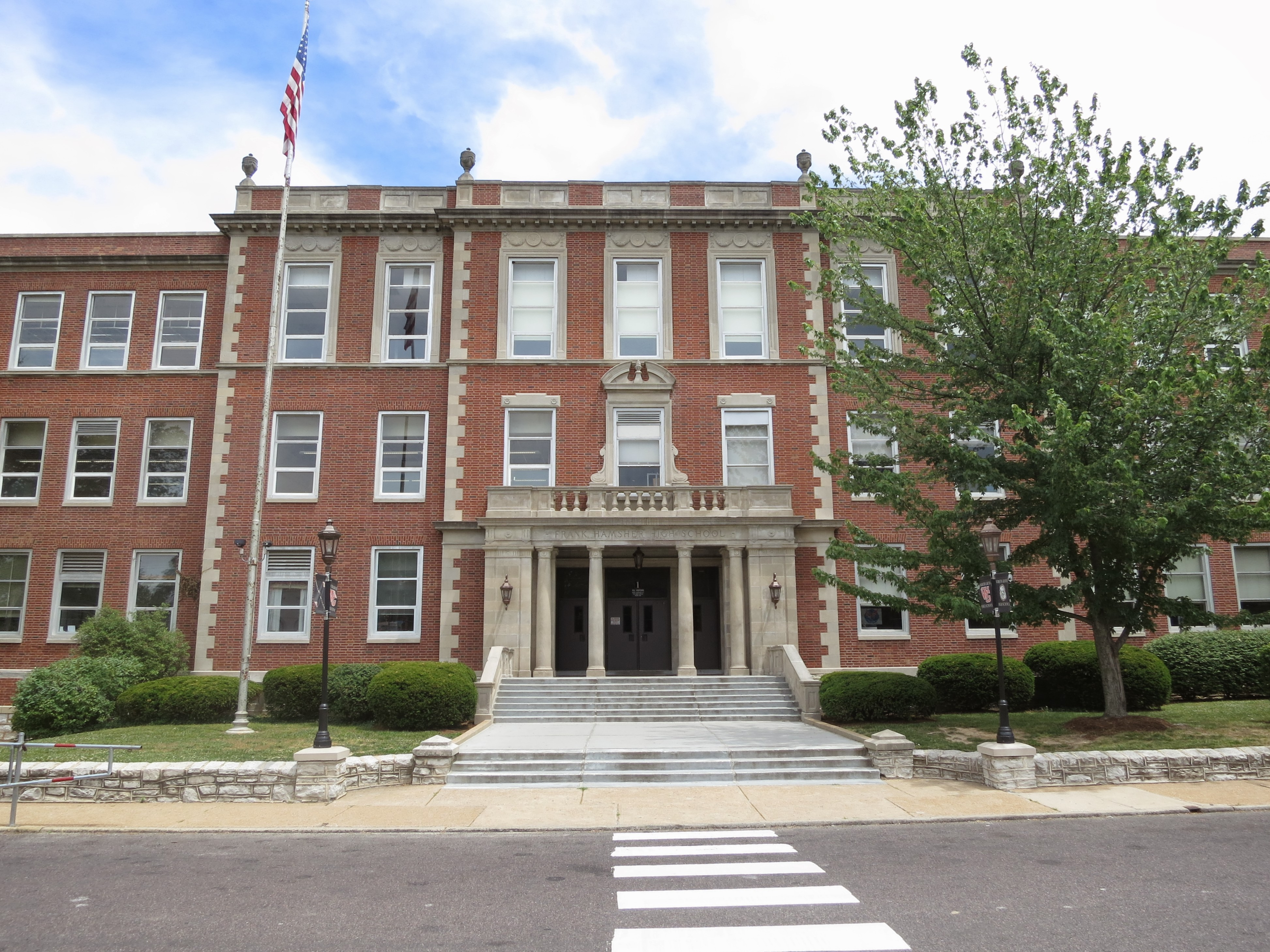
Webster Groves High School

Serving grades 9–12, WGHS opened 1889, as a 9th grade general course. In 1996, then-President Bill Clinton visited WGHS to commend the district's drug and violence prevention efforts, the same year that their basketball team won the District 4A State Championship against West Plains High School. In 1999 TIME Magazine featured a cover story to a week at Webster Groves High School (WGHS). There are 149 faculty.

Every Thanksgiving Day, the Statesmen football team plays Kirkwood High School's Pioneers in the annual Turkey Day game. This rivalry between the two schools started in 1907, and is the oldest high-school football rivalry west of the Mississippi River.

=== Middle schools ===
==== Hixson Middle School ====
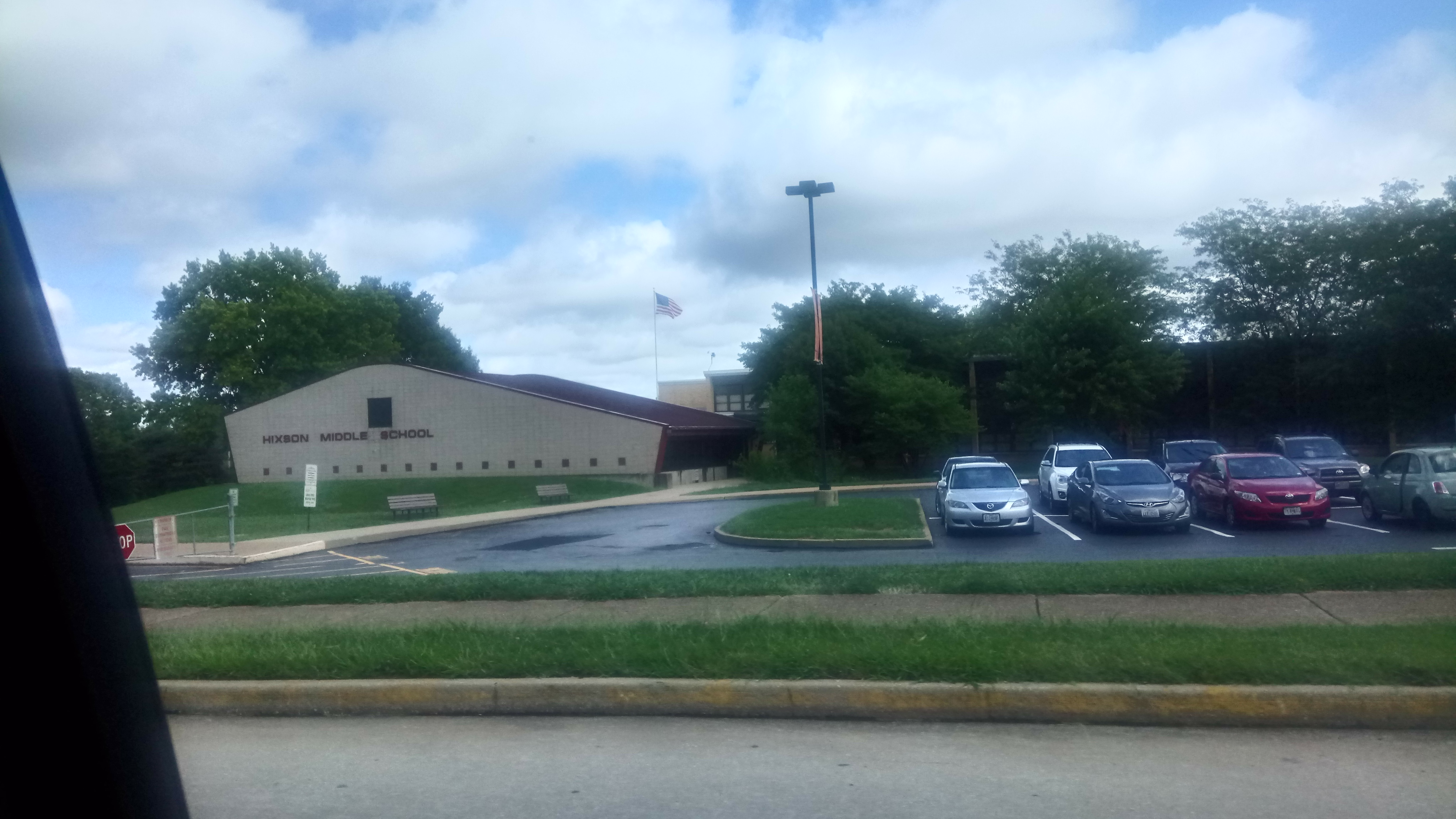
Hixson Middle School

Serving grades 6–8, opened 1955 as Hixson Junior High School (grades 6–8). In 2008, Hixson was awarded the state of Missouri's Gold Star honor. That same year, Hixson was named to Missouri's Top Ten list, ranking third for sustained high performance in eighth grade mathematics scores and science scores, as determined by the Missouri Assessment Program. In 2007, Hixson made the Top Ten list for its seventh grade mathematics scores.

Hixson was named for James Hixson, longtime Webster Groves High School principal. Hixson sits on 20 acres (8.1 ha), including Moss Field, a sports field shared with WGHS. A library annex was added on to the building in 1998, and a recent bond issue made possible a variety of building improvements: central air conditioning, wireless networking, new roofing, and complete renovation of the auditorium and cafeteria.

In April 2019, voters approved a $22 million bond issue that will move sixth grade to Hixson Middle School, and convert Givens into a neighborhood elementary school.

=== Elementary schools ===
==== Avery Elementary School ====
Serving grades K-5. Opened as Tuxedo School, Avery was renamed in 1916 for the Avery family, early settlers of Webster Groves. It is likely that Avery School sits on part of the former Avery family farm. At the start of the 2021–2022 school year, Avery's principal is Dr. Hannah Peterson. Prior to being Avery's principal, Dr. Peterson was the assistant principal at Bristol Elementary and a fifth grade teacher at Clark Elementary. Avery is noted for its very strong community involvement and support from parents, including the decades-old community theatre show The Avery Play. It was named a Missouri Gold Star school in 2007.

==== Bristol Elementary ====
Serving grades K-5, originally known as Webster School, opened in 1869. Bristol Elementary, known locally as 'Big Bristol', was named for Dr. Bennett Bristol, a physician and longtime member of the Board of Education. Bristol Elementary is across the street from sister school Bristol Primary School, or 'Little Bristol', which now houses the Walter Ambrose Family Center. Bristol's mascot is the bulldog.

==== Clark Elementary School ====
Serving grades K-5, Clark Elementary was named a Missouri Gold Star school in 2004–05 by the Missouri Department of Elementary and Secondary Education. Clark School, opened in 1948, was named for teacher Anna M. Clark, who taught in the district for 30 years. Clark Elementary is the only district school named after a woman. Clark's mascot is the eagle.

==== Givens Elementary School ====
Serving grades K-5, originally known as Webster Groves Elementary Computer School, located on the lower level of Steger 6th Grade Center. Givens (as it is informally known) is named after Dr. Henry Givens Jr, a former teacher and principal at Douglass School. Givens used to be a magnet school in the district, with students chosen by lottery. Givens gained attention in 1983 when it was established, as it was the first public elementary school in the country to incorporate computers into the school's curriculum. It was unusually small compared to other elementary schools because there was only one classroom per grade. Following the passage of Proposition E, Givens is now a neighborhood elementary school, occupying the entire building after 6th grade was transitioned to Hixson Middle School. The new principal of Dr. Henry Givens Jr. Elementary is Dr. Sharnez Givens-Williams.

==== Edgar Road Elementary School ====
Serving grades K-5, opened in 1951. The Edgar Road mission "is based on the belief that every child has a right to learn in a safe, supporting environment that encourages collaboration of staff, students, parents and community for the benefit of the individual learner, as well as the celebration of all our achievements." Edgar Road's mascot is the jaguar. The Current Principal of Edgar Road Elementary is Emily Burst since July 1, 2023.

==== Hudson Elementary School ====
Serving grades K-5. Originally part of the Rock Hill School District, Hudson was built in 1945 and merged with the Webster Groves School District three years later. Hudson has, with assistance from the Missouri Botanical Garden, developed a Youth Garden which also serves as an outdoor classroom. Hudson has received a Bronze Award for its use of PBIS (positive behavior interventions and supports.

In 2012, the cafeteria manager of the school was fired by the lunch contracting company for providing a child with regular lunches instead of a cheese sandwich, the meal given to students who cannot prove eligibility for regular lunches. After publicity of the firing, the cafeteria manager, Diane Brame, was re-hired.

==== The Walter Ambrose Family Center ====
Located in the former Bristol Primary School, and known locally as "Little Bristol", the building is home to Webster's Parents as Teachers program, a family education and support program beginning prenatally and serving children up to age 5; the district's Early Childhood Education Center, which offers a comprehensive program for children ages 2–5; and the Adventure Club, offering before-and after-school care for children ages K-6. The Walter Ambrose Family Center is named after Walter Ambrose, "a leader in the African-American community and an early supporter of programs for young children and their families.".

Ambrose's main function is serving as the district's preschool. Ambrose's educational philosophy is in line with Reggio Emilia approach, which allows students to self-direct their learning and the "spaces which they will transform through their collective, socially-constructed learning.". Students at Ambrose learn through play with teachers as facilitators for both their educational and social-emotional needs.
