= St. Louis County Football Conference Champions =

High school football contest in the US

Football, in the early years of St. Louis County, Missouri was a small affair. In time, the population grew with large growth periods happening after World War I and World War II. The first football conference was formed in 1908, with three known teams, and has now grown to 31 public high schools in St. Louis County. The conference has not only included St. Louis County teams, but also has included western neighboring St. Charles High School in St. Charles County, Missouri and Northeast High School and Northwest High School in Jefferson County, Missouri.

== History ==
The first three teams playing public high school football in St. Louis County were Kirkwood, Webster Groves, and Ferguson. There was also the Kirkwood Military Academy in Kirkwood. Ferguson was in north St. Louis County and Kirkwood and Webster Groves were neighbors in eastern St. Louis County, along the Missouri Pacific Railroad route, which is what caused their creations as cities. Kirkwood's first teams were in 1894 and 1895 and they were forced to play teams in the City of St. Louis, where the heavy action in the game was happening. Webster Groves became a four-year high school in 1898, which is when they organized their first high school football team. The game between Kirkwood and Webster Groves is now the famed Turkey Day Game, but the first game they played was November 18, 1898 and ended in a 6–6 tie. Between 1898 and 1905, the teams played four games, the years in which the teams did not play were because one of the schools did not have a team. In 1906, Kirkwood and Webster Groves played two games, one at Kirkwood and one at Webster Groves. The first game, played at Kirkwood, ended in a 0–0 tie and the second game, held at Webster Groves was a 5–0 victory for Kirkwood.

Date	Location	Winner	Score
October 13, 1906	Kirkwood	Tie	0-0
October 20, 1906	Webster Groves	Kirkwood	5-0

== The St. Louis County Football Championship ==
The two games played in 1906 caused Kirkwood and Webster Groves to create a best of three series for the championship of St. Louis County. A cup was purchased by the schools and the first game was played at The Stadium (now named Francis Field) at Washington University. Kirkwood won the first two games but, regardless, the third game was still played Thanksgiving Day. Kirkwood again won the game and the cup, which was intended to rotate annually to the winner. Winning the cup three years in a row would cause a school to keep the trophy, with a new one being purchased.

By 1908, the St. Louis County League was started with new schools coming into existence, all joining the new league. Kirkwood and Webster Groves chose to play their own original championship but also played each other for the championship of the County League. Kirkwood won both championships in 1908, causing a five-game win streak in two years against Webster Groves.

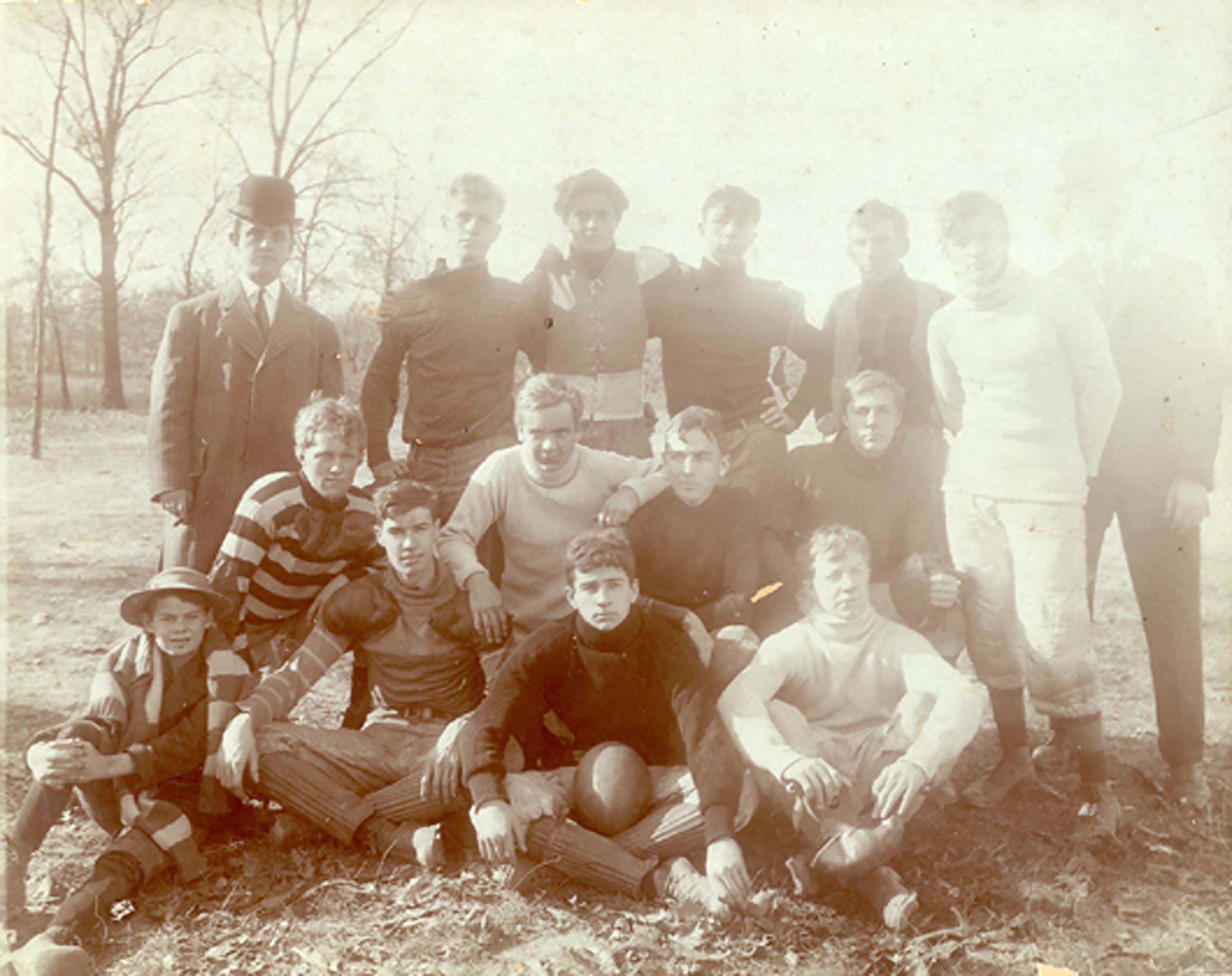

The 1907 Kirkwood football team was the first football champion of St. Louis County.

Date	Location	Winner	Score
October 5, 1907	The Stadium	Kirkwood	5-0
November 4, 1907	Webster Groves	Kirkwood	6-0
November 28, 1907	Kirkwood	Kirkwood	5-0
November 7, 1908	The Stadium	Kirkwood	17-12
November 26, 1908	Webster Groves	Kirkwood	5-0

== The St. Louis County League Football Championship ==
The County League began in 1908 with Kirkwood, Webster Groves, and Ferguson. In time, other schools joined the County League which, in 1926, joined the Missouri State High School Activities Association (MSHSAA). Those schools who later joined the County League were: Clayton, Maplewood, Normandy, Ritenour, St. Charles, University City, and Wellston. Webster Groves and Kirkwood dominated the championship of the County League until the latter part of the 1920s.

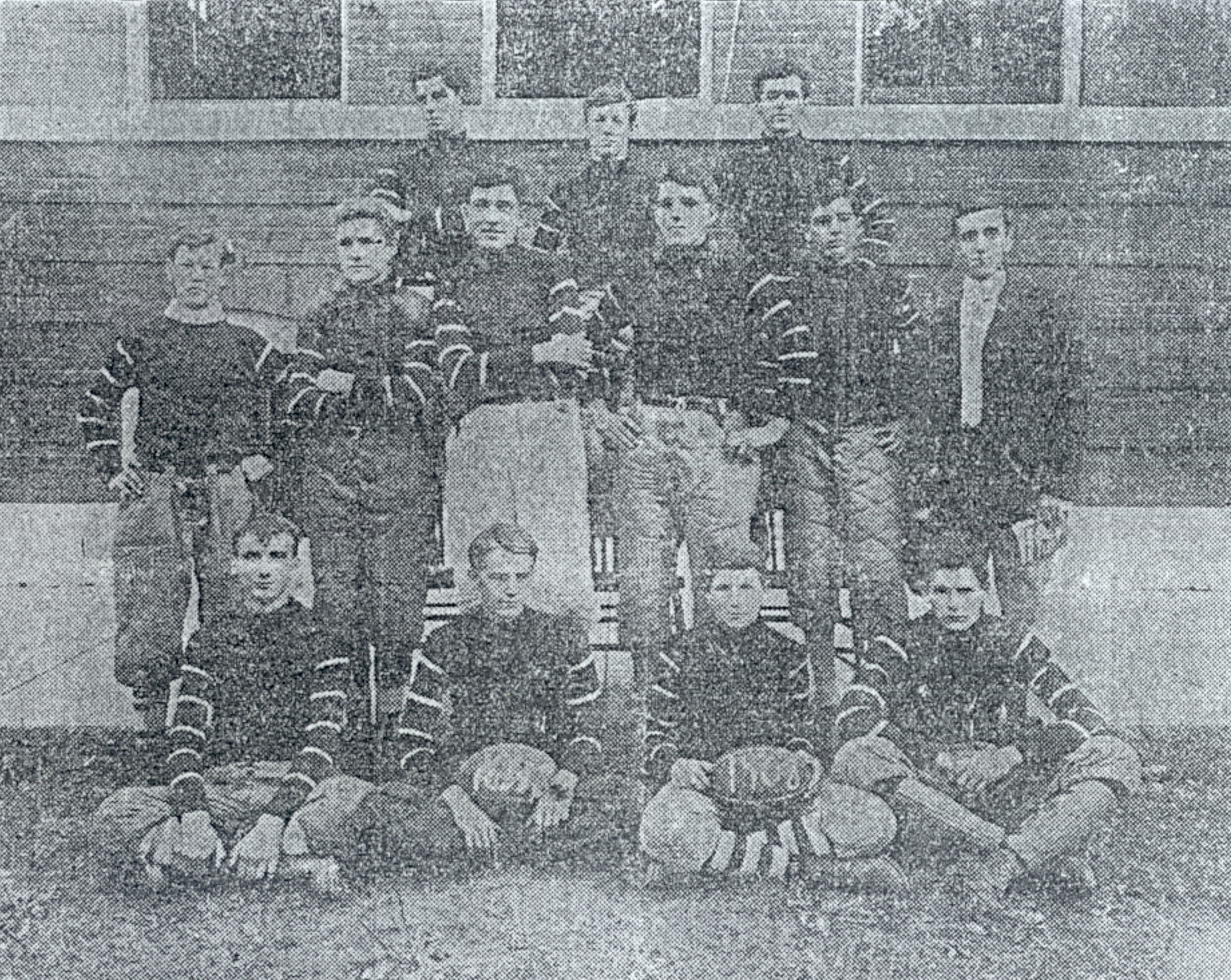
Kirkwood Football 1908

The 1908 Kirkwood football team was the first football champion of the St. Louis County League.

Year	County League Champion
1908	Kirkwood
1909	Webster Groves
1910	Webster Groves
1911	HIGH SCHOOL FOOTBALL BANNED
1912	Webster Groves
1913	Kirkwood
1914	Kirkwood
1915	Webster Groves
1916	Webster Groves
1917	Webster Groves
1918	Webster Groves
1919	Webster Groves
1920	Webster Groves
1921	Webster Groves
1922	Webster Groves
1923	Webster Groves, University City
1924	University City
1925	Webster Groves
1926	Webster Groves
1927	Maplewood
1928	University City
1929	University City, St. Charles
1930	University City, Normandy
1931	Normandy
1932	University City
1933	University City, Maplewood
1934	Maplewood
1935	Maplewood
1936	Normandy
1937	Normandy
1938	University City, Webster Groves
1939	University City
1940	University City
1941	Normandy
1942	University City
1943	University City
1944	Normandy
1945	Webster Groves
1946	Wellston

== The St. Louis Suburban League Football Championship ==
In 1947, the St. Louis County League was reorganized as the St. Louis Suburban League. From 1947 to 1951, all of the suburban teams played for one conference title.

In 1952, the suburban schools were organized as "Big" or "Little" schools, with a third "Middle" school conference being added in 1956. Group 1, the "Big" schools, were Ferguson (which later changed its name to McCluer), Kirkwood, Maplewood, Normandy, Ritenour, University City, and Webster Groves.

Group 2, the "Middle" schools, were Affton, Hazelwood, Lindbergh, Mehlville, St. Charles, and Pattonville. Mehlville, which started as a Big school, would later become a Middle school and Ladue, which started as a Small school, would move into the Middle schools too.

The Group 3, or "Small" or "Little" schools, were Berkeley, Brentwood, Clayton, Ladue, Parkway, Pattonvile, and Wellston.

Year	Suburban League Champion
1947	University City
1948	University City
1949	Clayton
1950	Maplewood
1951	University City

Year	Suburban Big Six Champion	Suburban Little Six Champion
1952	Ritenour	Clayton
1953	Maplewood, University City, Webster Groves	Ladue
1954	Webster Groves	Ladue
1955	Kirkwood	Ladue, Brentwood, Clayton

Year	Suburban Big Six Champion	Suburban Middle Champion	Suburban Little Champion
1956	University City	Ladue (Middle Five)	Pattonville (Little Six)
1957	Normandy	Ladue (Middle Five)	Pattonville (Little Six)
1958	University City	Ladue (Middle Six)	Affton (Small Seven)

== The St. Louis Suburban Conference Football Championship ==
In 1959, the Suburban League was renamed the Suburban Conference and it continued using its standard of Big, Middle, Little designations until 1963. In 1964, the Middle Conference teams were split between the Big and Little conferences until 1966, when the schools were reorganized as the Suburban North and Suburban South conferences. The Little Six remained a conference with the smallest St. Louis County schools staying in it.

In 1970, the Little Six Conference was renamed the Suburban League and kept that name until 1975. In 1974, the Suburban North divided its teams into an I-270 Division and a Rock Road Division, which only lasted a year. The Suburban South created a Red Division and a Green Division, which lasted two years.

In 1976, the Suburban Conference reorganized as the Suburban North, Suburban South, Suburban East, and Suburban West conferences and they remained organized that way until 2014.

Year	Suburban Big Champion	Suburban Middle Champion	Suburban Little Six Champion
1959	Normandy, Webster Groves (Big Seven)	Ladue (Middle Seven)	Lindbergh
1960	University City (Big Seven)	Ladue (Middle Seven)	Brentwood
1961	Normandy (Big Seven)	Ladue (Middle Seven)	Berkeley, Clayton
1962	McCluer (Big Eight)	Lindbergh (Middle Six)	Brentwood
1963	Ladue (Big Eight)	Lindbergh (Middle Six)	Parkway

Year	Suburban Big Ten Champion	Suburban Little Nine Champion
1964	Webster Groves	St. Charles
1965	Webster Groves	Brentwood

Year	Suburban North Champion	Suburban South Champion	Suburban Little Six Champion
1966	Riverview Gardens	Kirkwood	Brentwood
1967	Riverview Gardens	Kirkwood, Parkway	Brentwood
1968	McCluer	Webster Groves	Brentwood
1969	Riverview Gardens	Ladue	Brentwood

Year	Suburban North Champion	Suburban South Champion	Suburban League Champion
1970	Riverview Gardens, Ritenour	Webster Groves, Mehlville	Affton
1971	McCluer	Webster Groves, Lindbergh	Lafayette
1972	Hazelwood	Webster Groves, Ladue	Berkeley
1973	Normandy	Ladue	Berkeley, Affton
1974	Hazelwood (I-270 Division), Normandy (Rock Road Division)	Ladue (Red Division), Affton (Green Division)	Maplewood
1975	Riverview Gardens	Ladue, Webster Groves (Red Division), University City (Green Division)	Brentwood, Eureka

Year	Suburban North Champion	Suburban South Champion	Suburban East Champion	Suburban West Champion
1976	McCluer North	Ladue	Brentwood, Eureka	Oakville
1977	Hazelwood Central	Ladue	Brentwood	St. Charles
1978	Hazelwood Central	Webster Groves	Maplewood	Lindbergh, Parkway West
1979	Hazelwood East	Webster Groves	Brentwood	Lafayette
1980	Hazelwood East	Ladue	Brentwood	Parkway West
1981	Hazelwood Central	Parkway South	Eureka	Parkway West
1982	Hazelwood East	Parkway South	Brentwood	Parkway West
1983	Hazelwood Central	Webster Groves	Berkeley, Jennings	Kirkwood
1984	Hazelwood Central	Webster Groves, Ladue	Berkeley	Parkway West
1985	Hazelwood Central	Webster Groves	Berkeley	Parkway West, Lafayette
1986	Hazelwood Central	Ladue	Berkeley	Mehlville
1987	Riverview Gardens	Ladue	Berkeley	Mehlville, Lafayette
1988	McCluer North, Hazelwood Central, Hazelwood East	Parkway South	Affton	Kirkwood
1989	Hazelwood Central	Webster Groves	Affton	Lafayette
1990	Hazelwood East	Eureka	Jennings	Mehlville
1991	Hazelwood East	Webster Groves, Parkway South, Ladue	Jennings, Affton	Mehlville, Parkway Central
1992	Pattonville	Webster Groves	Ladue	Parkway South, Lafayette
1993	Hazelwood East, McCluer North	Eureka	Ladue	Parkway Central, Kirkwood
1994	Hazelwood East	Eureka	Ladue	Mehlville
1995	Hazelwood East	Parkway South	Ladue	Mehlville
1996	Pattonville	Webster Groves	Ladue	Mehlville
1997	Pattonville	Parkway North	Clayton	Kirkwood
1998	Hazelwood East, Riverview Gardens	Eureka	Clayton	Kirkwood
1999	Pattonville	Parkway South	Ladue	Mehlville
2000	Hazelwood East	Parkway South	Ladue, Clayton	Parkway West
2001	Hazelwood East	Eureka	Ladue	Mehlville, Parkway West, Parkway Central
2002	Hazelwood East, McCluer North	Eureka, Parkway South	Clayton	Parkway Central
2003	Hazelwood East	Webster Groves	Ladue	Mehlville, Lindbergh, Kirkwood
2004	McCluer North	Eureka, Summit	Clayton	Kirkwood
2005	Hazelwood East	Webster Groves	Affton, Ladue, Clayton	Kirkwood
2006	McCluer North	Parkway North	Jennings	Kirkwood
2007	Hazelwood East, McCluer North	Eureka	Normandy	Kirkwood
2008	Hazelwood Central, Hazelwood West	Eureka	Normandy	Lafayette, Mehlville
2009	Hazelwood Central	Webster Groves	Normandy	Lindbergh
2010	Hazelwood Central	Webster Groves	Ladue	Eureka, Lindbergh, Marquette
2011	McCluer North	Kirkwood	Ladue	Lafayette
2012	Hazelwood Central	Kirkwood, Parkway Central, Webster Groves	Ladue	Lafayette
2013	Hazelwood Central	Kirkwood, Parkway Central	Ladue	Eureka

== The St. Louis Suburban Public High School Athletic and Activities Association Football Championship ==
In 2014, the Suburban Conference reorganized as the St. Louis Suburban Public High School Athletic and Activities Association (SPHSAAA), with three conferences, each with two divisions: Suburban Central American, Suburban Central National, Suburban XII North, Suburban XII South, Suburban West American, Suburban West National. It operated in this format until 2019 but was reconfigured for the 2020 season, assigning each sport for a school into one of five conferences, based on the individual team's skill. The order of skill levels from strongest to weakest are: Yellow, Red, Green, Orange, and Blue.

Year	Suburban Central American Champion	Suburban Central National Champion	Suburban XII North Champion	Suburban XII South Champion	Suburban West American Champion	Suburban West National Champion
2014	Affton	Ladue	Hazelwood Central	Kirkwood	Eureka	Oakville
2015	Affton	Parkway Central	Hazelwood Central	Kirkwood	Eureka	Fox, Oakville
2016	STEAM Academy	Ladue	Hazelwood Central	Kirkwood	Eureka, Marquette, Lafayette	Fox
2017	STEAM Academy	Ladue	Hazelwood Central	Pattonville	Eureka	Fox
2018	STEAM Academy	Ladue	Hazelwood Central	Pattonville	Marquette	Fox
2019	Affton	Ladue	Hazelwood West	Kirkwood	Eureka	Fox

Year	Yellow	Red	Green	Orange	Blue
2020	Marquette	Lindbergh	Lafayette	Northwest	Pattonville
2021	Marquette, Hazelwood Central	Ladue	Summit	Seckman	McCluer
2022	Eureka	Lindbergh	Summit	Seckman	Hazelwood East
2023	Kirkwood	Lafayette	Summit	Seckman	Hazelwood East
2024	Eureka	Summit	Hazelwood East, Parkway West	Seckman	Riverview Gardens
2025	Lafayette	Ladue, Summit	Parkway North	Seckman	University City

== See also ==
- Suburban Conference (St. Louis)
