= Kyle Hawkins =

American lacrosse coach

Biographical details
- Born: December 16, 1970 (age 55); Rolla, Missouri

Coaching career (HC unless noted)
- 1994–1998: Hazelwood Central HS (MO)
- 1998–2007: University of Missouri (club team)
- 2008–2012: HTHC Hamburg Warriors
- 2012–2014: German National U-19 Men's team

Kyle Hawkins (born December 16, 1970) is the former head coach of the German National Men's U-19 lacrosse team, and former head coach of the University of Missouri Men's Lacrosse team. In May 2006, he discussed his sexual orientation with several media outlets, including the New York Times and MSNBC.com after having revealed to the university and team that he was gay. In April 2007, the story again made media waves with an Associated Press story featured on MSNBC.com. Hawkins was named the first openly gay man coaching an intercollegiate men's team sport by ESPN.

== Background ==
Hawkins was born in 1970 and brought up as a devout Southern Baptist in the St. Louis, Missouri suburb of Kirkwood, Missouri. He graduated from Kirkwood High School in 1989. He then attended Arizona State University where he was the president of a Southern Baptist student group. After college, he spent time as a high school teacher where he began coaching lacrosse. While working as a history teacher at Hazelwood Central High School, Hawkins also coached football. Some of the football players approached with interest in starting a lacrosse team in the offseason. They needed a coach, and Hawkins volunteered to coach the new team at Hazelwood Central.

== University of Missouri ==
After fours years at Hazelwood Central, Hawkins was hired as the head coach of the University of Missouri Men's Lacrosse Club. While coaching the lacrosse club, Hawkins taught history at Hickman High School in Columbia, Missouri. As coach of the Mizzou lacrosse club, Hawkins compiled a 112–49 record in his first eight years of coaching the team, including a conference championship in 2004 that gave the team a berth to the league's national tournament. In 2004, he was selected as the coach of the year.

On September 28, 2004, Hawkins joined the message boards at OutSports.com and made his first post, a 1,500-word anonymous message, seeking advice and guidance as an in-the-closet college coach. Later that year, he revealed his until-then hidden homosexuality to his parents and family who disowned him. Immediately after revealing his sexual orientation to his family, he informed the university and the other Missouri coaches. According to Hawkins, the university and his assistant coaches were supportive of his decision. The discussion continued for almost two years, until, on June 6, 2006, he finally posted under his real name and came out of the closet. The story was picked up by numerous national news agencies. The story again made headlines on April 7, 2007 when the Associated Press published a story detailing the after-effects of the original story.

== HTHC Hamburg ==
From 2008 to February 2013, Hawkins was head coach of the HTHC Hamburg Warriors of the Bundesliga Nord (BLN) of the German Lacrosse Association (DLaxV).

== German National U-19 Men's team ==
In 2012, Hawkins was named as the head coach of the German U-19 National Men's team and program. The team competed in the 2012 FIL World Championships, placing seventh.

== See also ==
- List of LGBT sportspeople
- Gay History
- Men's Collegiate Lacrosse Association
