= Marcus Harris (wide receiver, born 1989) =

American football player (born 1989)

No. 13, 18, 10
- Position: Wide receiver

Personal information
- Born: March 1, 1989 (age 37)
- Listed height: 6 ft 1 in (1.85 m)
- Listed weight: 187 lb (85 kg)

Career information
- High school: Kirkwood (Kirkwood, Missouri)
- College: Murray State
- NFL draft: 2011: undrafted

Career history
- Detroit Lions (2011)*; Tennessee Titans (2012)*; Omaha Nighthawks (2012); Iowa Barnstormers (2013); New York Giants (2013–2015); Baltimore Brigade (2017)*
- * Offseason or practice squad member only

Career AFL statistics
- Receptions: 94
- Receiving yards: 1,223
- Return yards: 1,265
- Total touchdowns: 19
- Stats at ArenaFan.com
- Stats at Pro Football Reference

Marcus Ryan "Soup" Harris (born March 1, 1989) is an American former professional football wide receiver. He played college football at Murray State University. He was a member of the Detroit Lions, Tennessee Titans, Omaha Nighthawks, Iowa Barnstormers, New York Giants, and Baltimore Brigade.

== Early life ==
Harris played quarterback for Kirkwood High School in Kirkwood, Missouri. He earned second-team all-state honors after passing for 1,800 yards and rushing for 450 yards his senior year. He also led the Pioneers to the class 5A state championship game, where they lost to Raymore-Peculiar High School. He was named first-team all-conference his junior and senior seasons. Harris was named honorable mention all-state after his junior year in which he threw for 2,423 yards.

== College career ==
Harris played football from 2007 to 2010 with the Murray State Racers. He finished his college career with 217 receptions, 2,479 receiving yards and 21 receiving touchdowns.

== Professional career ==
Harris was rated the 54th best wide receiver in the 2011 NFL draft by NFLDraftScout.com. He was signed by the Detroit Lions on July 28, 2011, after going undrafted in the 2011 NFL draft. He was released by the Lions on August 29, 2011. He was signed to the Lions' practice squad on November 30, 2011. Harris was signed to a reserve/futures contract by the Lions on January 10, 2012.

Harris signed with the Tennessee Titans on August 1, 2012. He was released by the Titans on August 26, 2012.

He spent the 2012 season with the Omaha Nighthawks of the United Football League.

Harris was signed by the Iowa Barnstormers of the Arena Football League (AFL) on February 27, 2013. He accrued 94 receptions, 1,223 receiving yards, and 19 touchdowns during the 2013 Arena Football League season.

He signed with the New York Giants on August 12, 2013. He was released by the Giants on August 31 and re-signed to the Giants' practice squad on September 1, 2013. He was released by the Giants on September 24, 2013, and re-signed to the team's practice squad on October 1, 2013. Harris was placed on injured reserve on August 26, 2014. He was released by the Giants on July 15, 2015, and placed on injured reserve on July 16, 2015. He became a free agent on March 9, 2016.

Harris was assigned to the Baltimore Brigade of the AFL on January 18, 2017. However, he did not end up playing for the Brigade.
