= Suburban Conference (St. Louis) =

High school athletic league in Missouri, US

- Formerly: St. Louis Suburban Public High School Athletic and Activities Association (SPHSAAA)
- Association: MSHSAA
- No. of teams: 31
- Region: Greater St. Louis
- Website: stlsuburbanathletics.com

The Suburban Conference, formally the St. Louis Suburban Public High School Athletic and Activities Association (SPHSAAA), is a Missouri State High School Activities Association (MSHSAA) recognized high school extracurricular league, based near Creve Coeur, Missouri, a suburb of St. Louis. The conference is one of the largest in the state, comprising 31 member schools from St. Louis County and Jefferson County. It evolved from the St. Louis County League, formed in 1908 St. Louis County Football Conference Champions.

== Realignments ==
Because of the large number of teams in the conference, the conference has historically been divided geographically into sub-conferences and divisions. Prior to the 2014–15 school year, there were four conferences: Suburban East, Suburban North, Suburban South, and Suburban West.

In 2018, the St. Louis Suburban Public High School Athletic and Activities Association re-aligned their conferences into various pools by sport. This decision essentially made the existing sub-conferences and divisions irrelevant, as a given school competes against a different pool of schools in each sport. For purposes of athletic competition, pool assignments are based on the following factors: athletics offered, competitive balance, competitive trends, diversity, and school size. The number of pools varies from two (boys volleyball) to five (football), depending on the sport, with most sports having three or four pools. Pools may be realigned if one or more of the previously mentioned standards are not met.

== Member schools ==
School	Nickame	Colors	Town	County	9–12 Enrollment (2024)	Primary MSHSAA Classification
Affton High School	Cougars		Affton	St. Louis	739	Class 4
Clayton High School	Greyhounds		Clayton	St. Louis	844	Class 4
Eureka High School	Wildcats		Eureka	St. Louis	1,712	Class 5/6
Fox High School	Warriors		Arnold	Jefferson	1,742	Class 5/6
Hazelwood Central High School	Hawks		Florissant	St. Louis	1,628	Class 5/6
Hazelwood East High School	Spartans		Spanish Lake	St. Louis	1,264	Class 5
Hazelwood West High School	Wildcats		Hazelwood	St. Louis	2,042	Class 5/6
Jennings High School	Warriors		Jennings	St. Louis	691	Class 4
Kirkwood High School	Pioneers		Kirkwood	St. Louis	1,737	Class 5/6
Ladue Horton Watkins High School	Rams		Ladue	St. Louis	1,324	Class 5
Lafayette High School	Lancers		Wildwood	St. Louis	1,742	Class 5/6
Lindbergh High School	Flyers		Sappington	St. Louis	2,266	Class 5/6
Marquette High School	Mustangs		Clarkson Valley	St. Louis	2,155	Class 5/6
McCluer High School	Comets		Florissant	St. Louis	1,181	Class 5
McCluer North High School	Stars		Florissant	St. Louis	1,136	Class 5
Mehlville High School	Panthers		Mehlville	St. Louis	1,440	Class 5/6
Normandy High School	Vikings		Wellston	St. Louis	747	Class 4
Northwest High School	Lions		Cedar Hill	Jefferson	1,841	Class 5/6
Oakville High School	Tigers		Oakville	St. Louis	1,684	Class 5/6
Parkway Central High School	Colts		Chesterfield	St. Louis	1,244	Class 5
Parkway North High School	Vikings		Maryland Heights	St. Louis	1,074	Class 5
Parkway South High School	Patriots		Manchester	St. Louis	1,598	Class 5/6
Parkway West High School	Longhorns		Chesterfield	St. Louis	1,408	Class 5
Pattonville High School	Pirates		Maryland Heights	St. Louis	1,893	Class 5/6
Ritenour High School	Huskies		Breckenridge Hills	St. Louis	1,873	Class 5/6
Riverview Gardens High School	Rams		Bellefontaine Neighbors	St. Louis	1,331	Class 5
Rockwood Summit High School	Falcons		Fenton	St. Louis	1,229	Class 5
Seckman High School	Jaguars		Seckman	Jefferson	1,793	Class 5/6
STEAM Academy at McCluer South-Berkeley	Bulldogs		Ferguson	St. Louis	437	Class 3
University City High School	Lions		University City	St. Louis	726	Class 4
Webster Groves High School	Statesmen		Webster Groves	St. Louis	1,315	Class 5

== Rivalries ==
The Suburban Conference has some historic rivalries between its schools, but also those that are generally unknown outside the community.

(Note: most of the following information mainly applies to football. The intensity of these rivalries, and their rivalries in general, can vary by sport.)

=== Kirkwood–Webster Groves ===
The most notable and historic rivalry between any Suburban Conference member school is, by far, the rivalry between the Kirkwood Pioneers and the Webster Groves Statesmen football teams. Their "Turkey Day Game" on Thanksgiving has been a St. Louis tradition since 1928 and began as a conference championship, which the two schools dominated until the mid 1920s St. Louis County Football Conference Champions. In 1952, the winning team was awarded the "Frisco Bell" trophy. It is the only remaining traditional Thanksgiving Day football game between two Missouri high schools, and is the only one in the state to be held after the MSHSAA State Championship game. This game's traditional date also means that they are the only two schools in the state to have an extra bye week during the regular season.

=== Clayton–Ladue ===
Another strong rivalry in this division is between the Clayton Greyhounds and Ladue Rams.

=== Eureka–Lafayette ===
The Eureka Wildcats and the Lafayette Lancers are strong rivals in the Rockwood School District. Both schools are located off of Missouri Route 109, hence its nickname, the “Battle of 109” rivalry.

=== Mehlville–Oakville ===
A generally unknown rivalry is the battle between the Mehlville Panthers and the Oakville Tigers. There is a noticeable "big brother, little brother" hatred between the two Mehlville School District high schools, Mehlville High being the older, more established institution compared to its counterpart. Students usually know someone attending the other school, influenced both by the schools’ close proximity to one another and the district's feeder system.

=== Other notable rivalries ===
- Pattonville Pirates vs. Ritenour Huskies
- Affton Cougars vs. Bayless Bronchos (Bayless High School is not a member of the Suburban Conference)
- Fox Warriors vs. Seckman Jaguars
