= Cactus Keck =

American baseball player (1899–1981)

- Pitcher
- Born: January 13, 1899; St. Louis, Missouri, U.S.
- Died: February 6, 1981 (aged 82); St. Louis, Missouri, U.S.
- Batted: Right Threw: Right

MLB debut
- May 26, 1922, for the Cincinnati Reds

Last MLB appearance
- October 7, 1923, for the Cincinnati Reds

MLB statistics
- Win–loss record: 10–12
- Earned run average: 3.51
- Strikeouts: 43
- Stats at Baseball Reference

Teams
- Cincinnati Reds (1922–1923)

Frank Joseph "Cactus" Keck (January 13, 1899 – February 6, 1981) was an American pitcher in Major League Baseball. He played for the Cincinnati Reds.

Keck attended Kirkwood High School in Kirkwood, Missouri, where he threw a no-hitter against Maplewood High School. The St. Louis Browns secured exclusive rights to negotiate a contract with Keck upon his graduation from high school.

Keck ended his professional baseball career in 1930 to become a firefighter in Kirkwood. He retired as an assistant fire chief in 1967 and died in 1981.
