= Kirkwood–Webster Groves Turkey Day Game =

High school football contest in the US

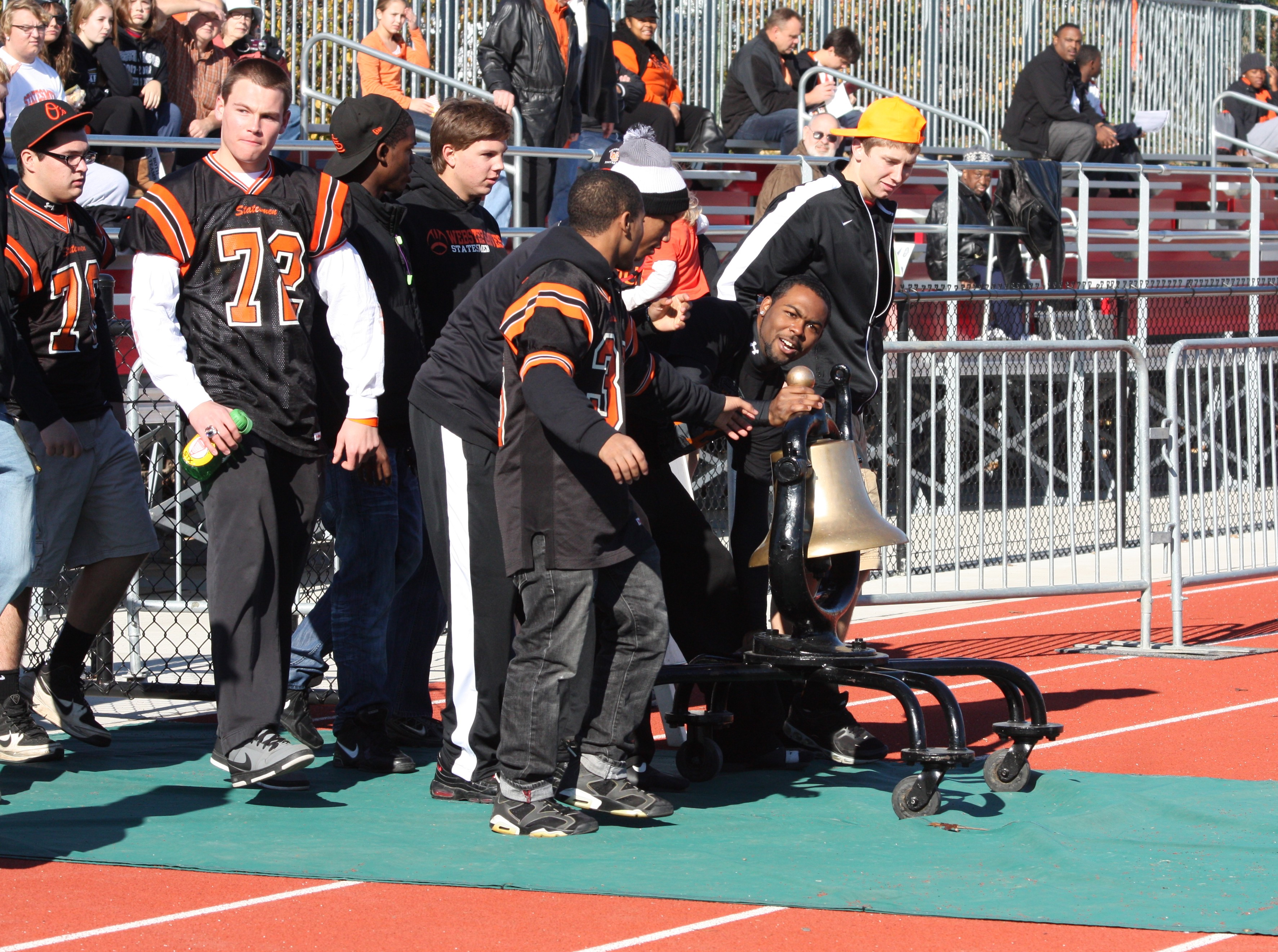
The Varsity football team rolls in the Frisco Bell to the 2011 Turkey Game at E. L. Lyons Memorial Stadium in Kirkwood

In Missouri, the Turkey Day Game is an annual American high school football contest between Kirkwood High School's Pioneers and Webster Groves High School's Statesmen, two teams based in St. Louis County, Missouri. The contest has traditionally been played on Thanksgiving starting in 1928 but was originally a game played for the St. Louis County, Missouri football championship.

== History ==
=== 1898 to 1923 ===
The Kirkwood-Webster Groves rivalry celebrated its 100th anniversary in 2007. Newly found evidence shows that 2007 also celebrated the 100th known football game since 1898 between the two schools (there were no games played in 1899, 1900, 1904, and 1905) and the 77th game played on Thanksgiving Day between the varsity teams of the two schools. Prior to being the Turkey Day Game, the game was the annual conference game. It was not regularly played on Thanksgiving until 1928. Kirkwood and Webster Groves high schools were originators of the football championship of St. Louis County and held two games in 1906 and three in 1907. They also played for two championships in 1908. The schools suspended play between their football teams from 1924 to 1927. The four-year hiatus in the 1920s came after a melee occurred on the field in 1923 that involved spectators from the stands. A referee called back all three of Kirkwood's touchdowns due to penalties, allowing Webster Groves to win the game 7–0. The win gave Webster Groves its eighth consecutive win and a 14–7–2 lead in the varsity series since 1898.

=== 1928 to 1974 ===
The game resumed in 1928 and was played continuously on Thanksgiving Day through 1974. While not the only Thanksgiving football game in Missouri during its early existence, the state's high school athletic commission shut down most others (one prominent example being the Mineral Water Bowl in Excelsior Springs) after 1950, while leaving the Kirkwood–Webster Groves game intact.

In 1975, the NFL awarded the then-St. Louis Cardinals hosting rights to one of its two annual Thanksgiving games in a bid to improve the Cardinals' public profile. There was a major snowstorm two nights before Thanksgiving and the game was rescheduled for the Saturday afterward. The NFL move drew controversy both in St. Louis and in the NFL (particularly from Dallas Cowboys president Tex Schramm, who wanted the games hosted by his team permanently). For 1976, as the Cardinals played the Cowboys in Dallas, the Turkey Day Game went on as scheduled, as it also did in 1977 when St. Louis hosted its second and, to date, final NFL Thanksgiving game. The publicity effort was largely a failure and a backfire, as the Cardinals lost all three games by wide margins and the NFL quickly returned hosting rights to the games to the Cowboys forever, leaving the Turkey Day Game as St. Louis's only Thanksgiving football.

=== 1976 to 2019, 2021– ===
The game was also not held on Thanksgiving in 1980 or 1985. Two games between the two teams are recorded in 1983.

The institution of the Show-Me Bowl, a statewide championship tournament for high school football in Missouri, has complicated the playing of the Turkey Day Game, much as state championships elsewhere in the United States have done; both Kirkwood and Webster Groves have typically been contenders for the state title since approximately 2002. The first time this would be an issue was the 1979 contest, in which Webster Groves played the JV squad for most of the Turkey Day Game, still managing to win, en route to the state title. In 1988, Webster Groves decided not to play the Turkey Day Game and chose to contest for the Show-Me Bowl instead. To allow the game to not be canceled because of such conflicts in future years, the two schools agreed to the "Turkey Day Agreement." The agreement, which was based on the precedent set in the 1979 game, stipulates that in the event that either Kirkwood or Webster Groves advances to the Show-Me Bowl state championship game, the non-varsity members of the junior varsity and freshman squads play instead. The agreement was first invoked in 2002, and again in 2003 and 2006.

The Kirkwood and Webster Groves varsity teams did not meet in the Turkey Day Game for a four-year stretch between 2009 and 2012. This is because every year in that time span, at least one of the two teams advanced to the Show-Me Bowl, thus invoking the Agreement and relegating the contest to a junior varsity match. In 2010, there was an unusual situation: the Kirkwood and Webster Groves varsity teams met in the Class 5 state semifinals the weekend before Thanksgiving, assuring one of them would advance to the Show-Me Bowl; Webster Groves won the game, 28–0. In addition to the pre-Thanksgiving matchup, the junior varsity teams played on Thanksgiving itself. In 2012 and 2013, the two teams faced each other in the playoffs earlier in November, which was more common given the two schools' proximity. Even though the two had already met in the playoffs earlier in 2013, the varsity teams met in the Turkey Day Game on Thanksgiving itself, breaking a five-year JV streak; Kirkwood avenged its earlier loss in a 44–0 rout. Kirkwood would also win the 2014 and 2015 contests, 33–6 and 42–13 respectively.

When the Rams left St. Louis in 2016, closing the Show-Me Bowl's permanent home venue, the Show-Me Bowl was split up so that the lowest class, the eight-man football class, and the largest, Class 6, are held the weekend before Thanksgiving. By this point, Kirkwood, which had been a Class 5 school as recently as 2013, had grown into Class 6, which resulted in Kirkwood being able to advance all the way to the 2016 Show-Me Bowl (which it won) and play the Turkey Day Game in the same year without invoking the Agreement; using their backup quarterback, Kirkwood won their fourth consecutive Turkey Day Game 17–6. It was the second time either team won both the state title and the Turkey Day Game in the same year, following Webster Groves's achievement of the feat in 1979 (coincidentally, the next year would begin the only other Kirkwood four-game winning streak in the game's record). By the early 2020s, the Show-Me Bowls been reunited at one location and moved to the weekend after Thanksgiving weekend. Kirkwood returned to Class 5 in 2025, once again restoring the possibility of Kirkwood and Webster playing a varsity playoff game against each other (in this case, a state quarterfinal as both schools are in separate districts) prior to Thanksgiving itself.

2020 had no game played because of the COVID-19 pandemic. The rivalry resumed in 2021 with Kirkwood registering yet another blowout win, their eighth consecutive victory. The 2021 contest, which the Pioneers won 65–0, was also notable for both head coaches being black, the first time that had ever happened in the series. The Pioneers, coached by NFL alumnus Jeremy Maclin, won their tenth straight Turkey Day Game in 2023, defeating the Statesmen 65–13, which was a modest improvement for the Statesmen paralleling the team's regular season performance that year. For 2024, Kirkwood advanced into the state semifinals, triggering the Turkey Day Agreement over the objections of Webster Groves varsity players. The Agreement was again triggered in 2025, which Kirkwood's jayvees again won in a 45–14 blowout.

The Turkey Day Game site alternates between Moss Field (Webster Groves) on even years and Lyons Field (Kirkwood) on odd years. As of the end of 2025 (counting Thanksgiving and non-Thanksgiving games), the series is tied 58–58–7. Among only Thanksgiving games, Kirkwood leads the series 48–37–5. Since 2013, the game has grown lopsided in Kirkwood's favor, with the Pioneers winning all 12 contests in that span. With the 2021 discontinuation of the Big Bone Game in San Jose, California, the Turkey Day Game is the last ongoing Thanksgiving high school football game west of the Mississippi River.

== Festivities ==
The term Turkey Day in both Kirkwood and Webster has grown to encompass not only the football game itself, but the festivities in the week prior to Thanksgiving Day. Both schools participate in extensive activities surrounding Turkey Day during Thanksgiving week, including "Tacky Day" on the Monday of game week where students wear the other school's colors. The Friendship Dance is held every year at the high school not hosting that year's game, as a gesture of friendship between the schools. Each school names a Friendship Court and selects a Friendship Queen and King from the court. In addition, each grade level at both schools decorate a hallway in a unique theme, and are then judged. At both schools, the activities culminate in respective pep rallies both on the last day of school of that week (Tuesday) and the Wednesday night before the game. At both Kirkwood and Webster, there is a bonfire after the Wednesday night pep rally. The Wednesday also features the Chili Bowl, where local Webster Groves and Kirkwood restaurants compete in a chili cook-off. The Turkey Day Run takes place on the morning of the game and draws many school alumni and community members, and on the day after the football game Webster and Kirkwood's hockey teams play a non-league game for the Turkey Day Trophy. Drawing thousands of people every year, the game itself has grown in popularity to the likes of the local news and cable broadcasts of the game. As well as being recognized by ESPN, the game has garnered a multipage exclusive article in Sports Illustrated.

Since 1952, a bell from a retired locomotive, donated by the Frisco Railroad Company, has been used as the trophy for the Turkey Day Game. The winner of the game takes possession of the Frisco Bell until the next game. The Bell was first awarded to Kirkwood, despite the game ending in a tie, because Webster Groves had lost the previous year's game. Since 1940, the loser has received the Little Brown Jug, which originally had painted the years and scores of the game on its back, but now has been replaced with the Centennial Jug, with the history of the coaches painted on it.

== Broadcasting ==
KTRS (AM 550)Turkey Day Game at ktrs.com. KWRH (FM 92.9) at KWRH929.com

The 2017 and 2018 games were streamed via Internet television on the online media of KSDK (channel 5).
