= Shaw Nature Reserve =

Private nature reserve in Gray Summit, Missouri, United States

Coordinates: 38.482032°N 90.824103°W

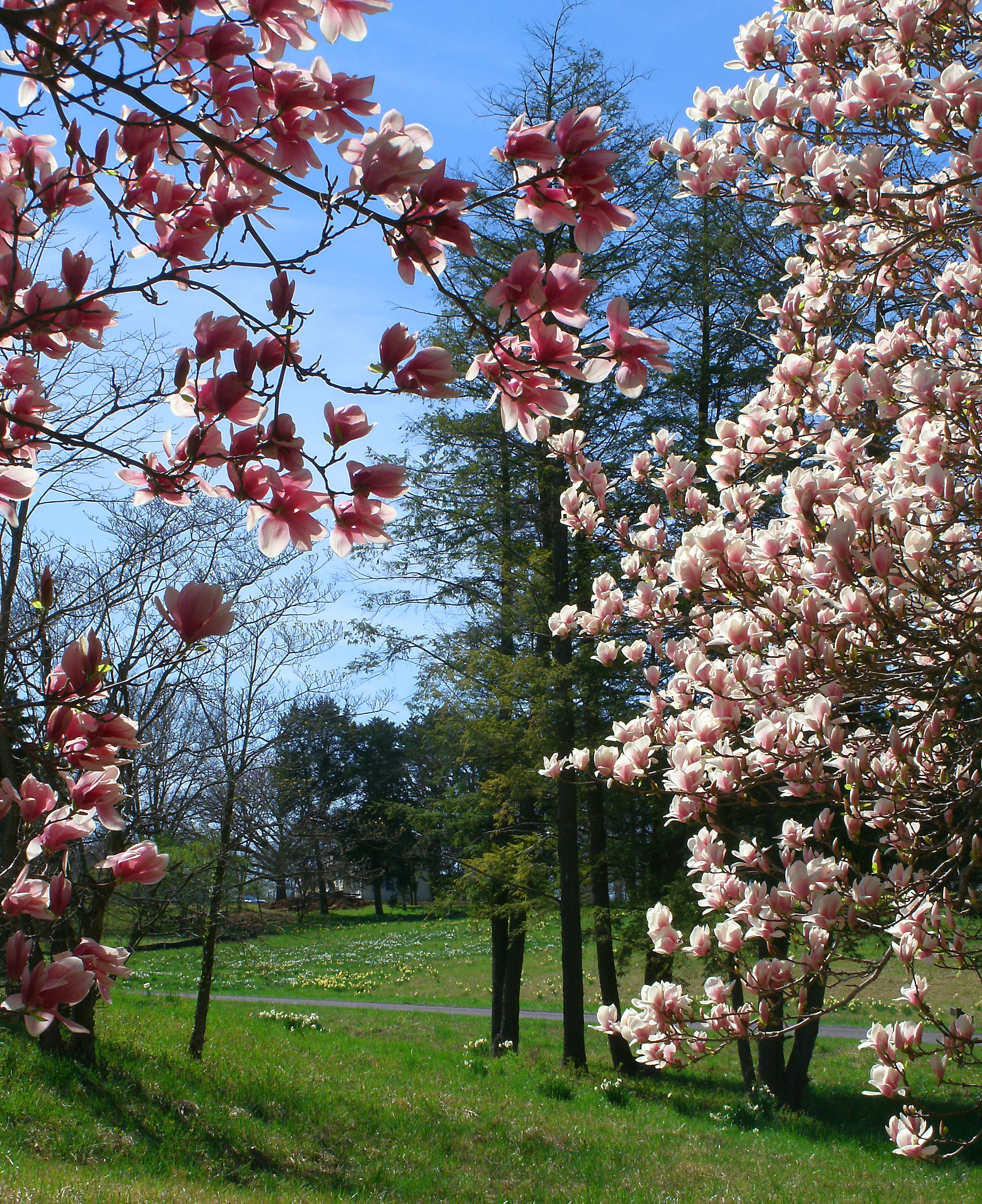
- Magnolia groves and daffodil fields grace the Nature Reserve in the spring.
- Interactive map of Shaw Nature Reserve
- Open: Year-round, 7-days a week, and closed some holidays.
- Website: Official website

Shaw Nature Reserve, formerly known as Shaw Arboretum, is a 2,400 acres (9.7 km^{2}) private non-profit nature reserve located in Gray Summit, Missouri, that is operated as an extension of the Missouri Botanical Garden.

The first piece of land, 1,300 acres (5.3 km^{2}), was purchased in 1925 when pollution from coal smoke in St. Louis threatened the Garden's live plant collection, especially the orchid collection. The orchids were moved to what was then known as the Gray Summit Extension in 1926. The pollution in St. Louis decreased with the waning use of coal for heat, making it unnecessary to move the rest of the live plant collection. The Garden made five more land purchases between 1926 and 1977 amounting to the Nature Reserve's current size of 2,444 acres (9.89 km^{2}).

Shaw Nature Reserve has several historic homes, including the Joseph H. Bascom House, built in 1879 by Confederate Colonel Thomas Crews. The reserve also contains the Dana Brown Overnight Center, a collection of log and timber buildings from the 1850s that were moved from their original locations and reconstructed on site, and a Sod House built by reserve staff to represent the kind of lodgings that would have been used in the area's original prairies.

The habitats restored at the reserve include a large tallgrass prairie, glades, woodlands, wetlands and a wetland blind from which herons can be observed. The Nature Reserve is also home to the Whitmire Wildflower Garden, a 3 acres (0.012 km^{2}) Missouri native garden with over 500 native plant species, and a children's Nature Explore Classroom. Over 17 miles (27 km) of hiking trails run through the Nature Reserve, along with four miles of road. The longest trail in the park is the Rus Goddard River Trail, a 2.5 mile loop that descends to a gravel bar in the Meramec River. The trail is named after a volunteer who spent more than 20 years maintaining trails in the reserve.

== Gallery ==
Located south of I-44 at Gray Summit.

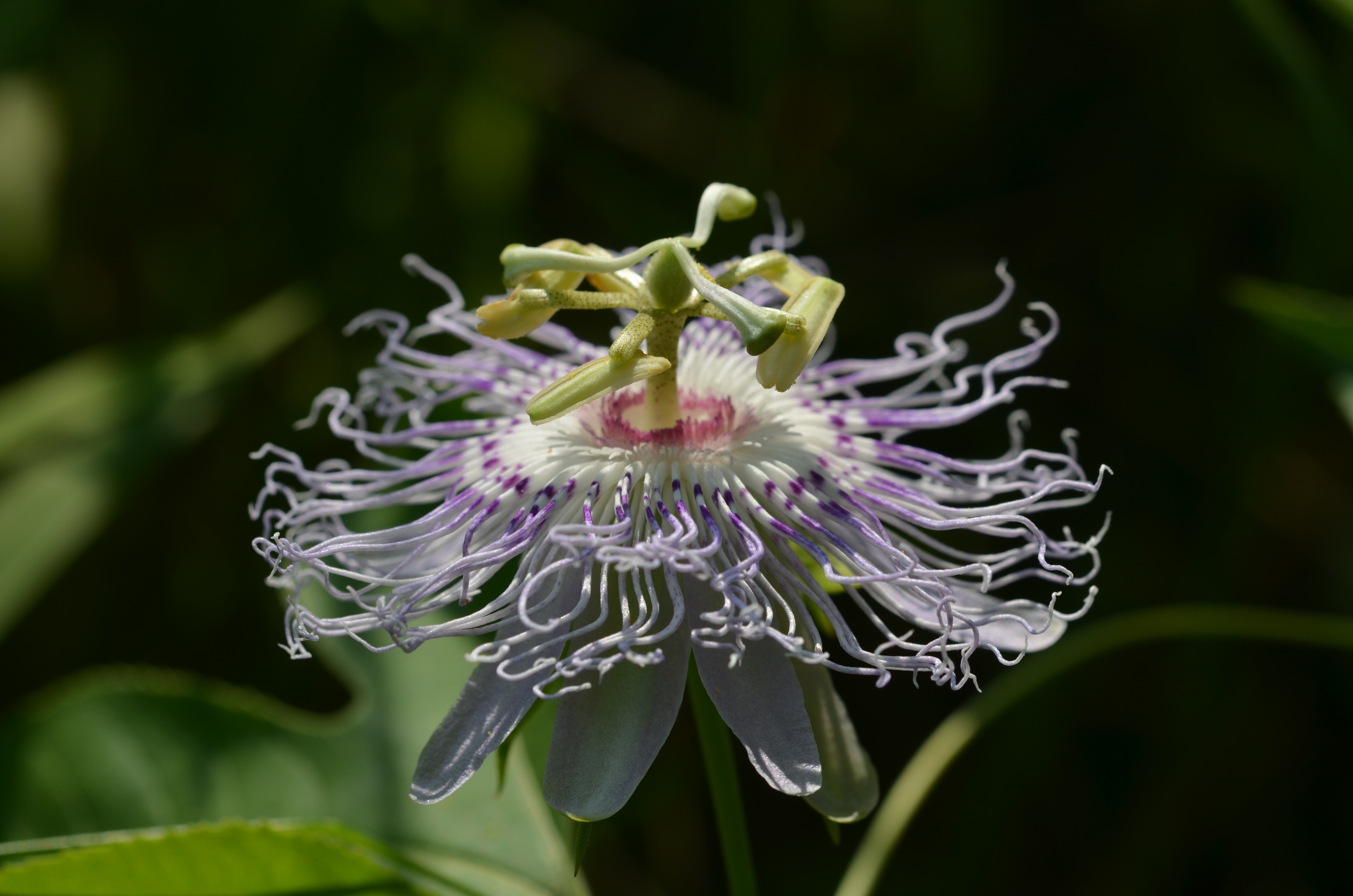
Passion flower.

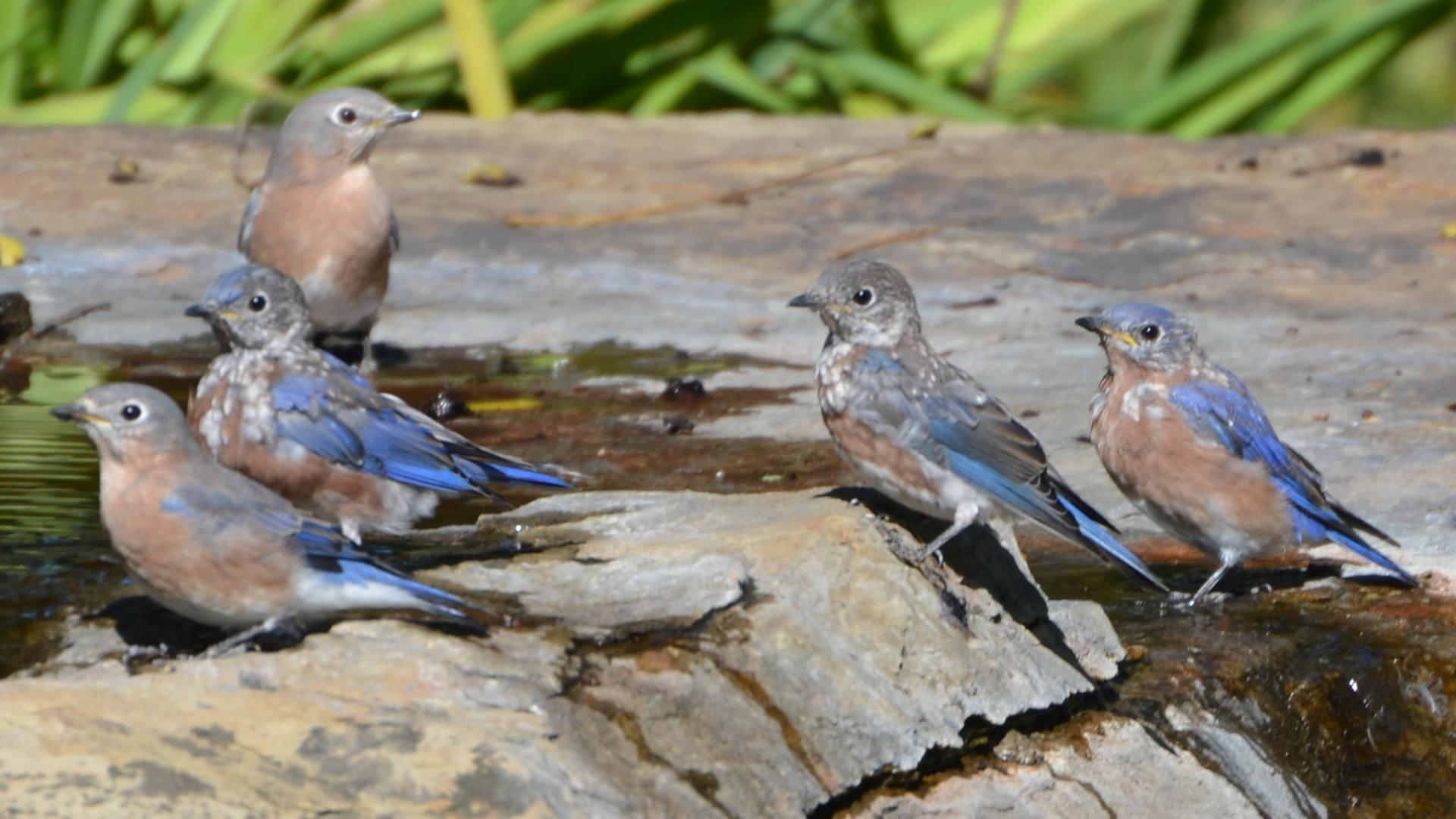
Eastern Bluebirds.

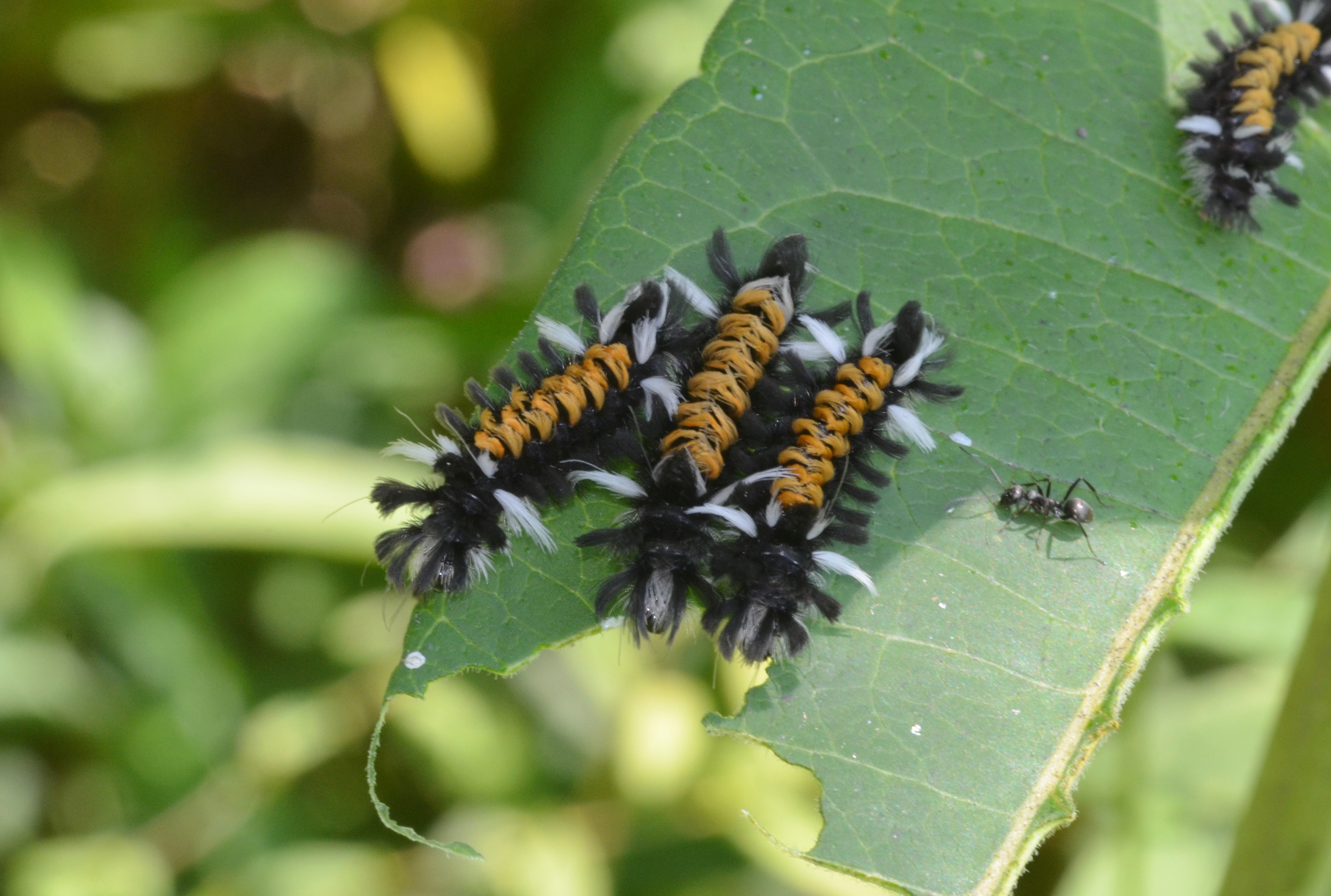
Milkweed Tussock Moth (caterpillar)

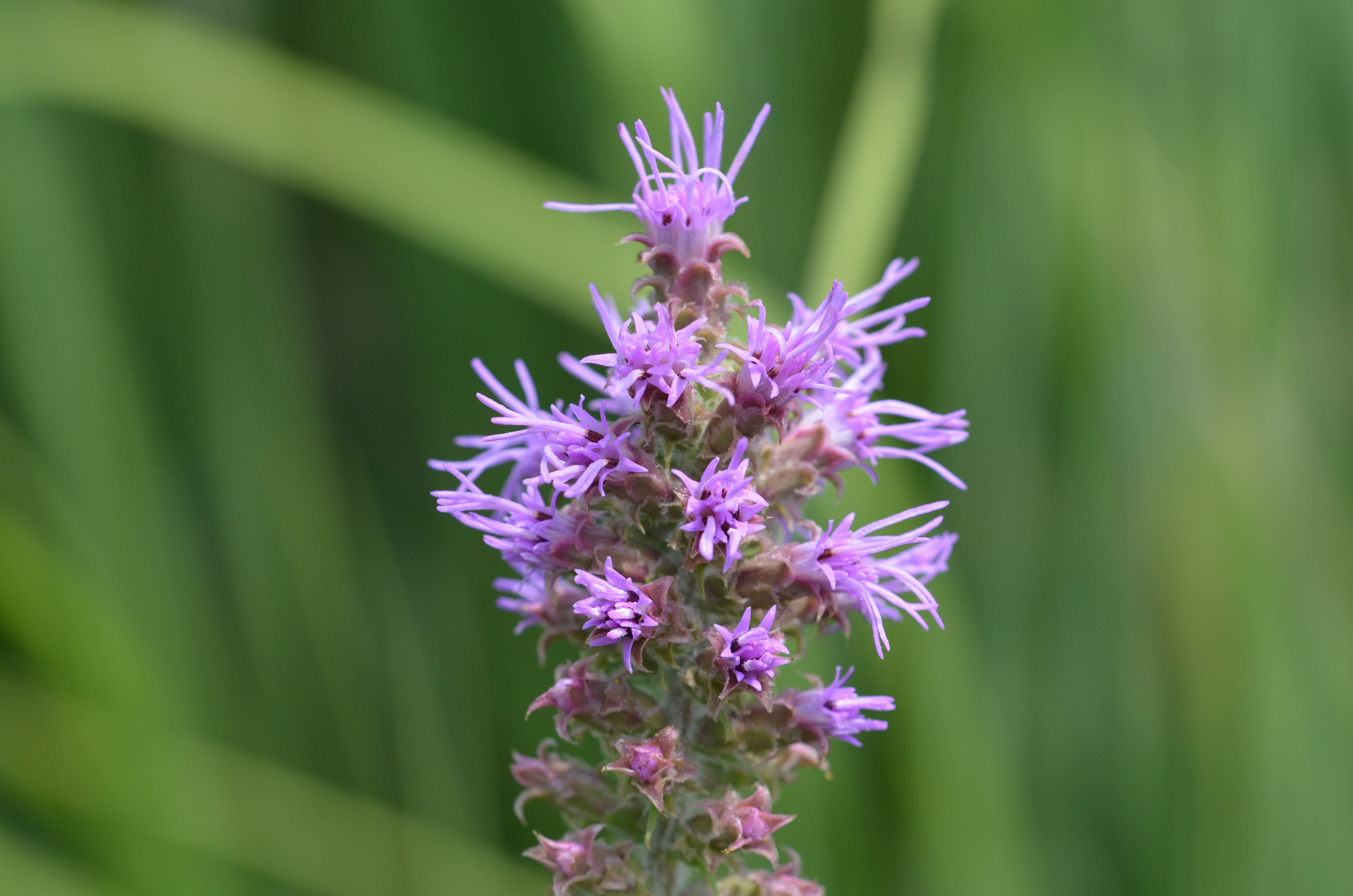
A variety of plants are at the reserve.
