= Kirkwood, Missouri =

City in Missouri, United States

Kirkwood
- City
- City of Kirkwood
- Railway Park Downtown Kirkwood Kirkwood Train Station

- Location of Kirkwood, Missouri
- Coordinates: 38°34′44″N 90°25′13″W
- Country: United States
- State: Missouri
- County: St. Louis
- Incorporated: 1865, 1899 (as a 4th-class city), 1930 (as a 3rd-class city), 1984 (as a home rule city)

Government
  - Mayor: Elizabeth Gibbons
  - Chief Administrative Officer: Darren Lamb

Area
  - Total: 9.20 sq mi (23.84 km^{2})
  - Land: 9.18 sq mi (23.78 km^{2})
  - Water: 0.023 sq mi (0.06 km^{2})
- Elevation: 584 ft (178 m)

Population (2020)
  - Total: 29,461
  - Density: 3,208.4/sq mi (1,238.78/km^{2})
- Time zone: UTC−6 (Central (CST))
  - Summer (DST): UTC−5 (CDT)
- FIPS code: 29-39044
- GNIS feature ID: 2395549
- Website: www.kirkwoodmo.org

Kirkwood is an inner-ring suburb of St. Louis located in western St. Louis County, Missouri. As of the 2020 census, the city's population was 29,461. Founded in 1853, the city is named after James P. Kirkwood, chief engineer of the Pacific Railroad. It was the first planned suburb located west of the Mississippi River.

== History ==
Plans for a new community close to St. Louis were begun after the St. Louis fire of 1849 and the preceding and subsequent cholera outbreaks that killed one-tenth of the residents of downtown St. Louis. In 1850, Hiram W. Leffingwell and Richard Smith Elliott bought land 14 miles (23 km) from downtown, which was at about the same time James P. Kirkwood, chief engineer of the Missouri Pacific Railroad, was laying out a route for the train line. The city of Kirkwood, named after the chief engineer, was platted in 1852. Kirkwood was the first suburban municipality built outside of the St. Louis city boundaries.

When the railroad reached the community in 1853, the developers sold lots for the Kirkwood Association. Other Leffingwell developments were to include the construction of Grand Avenue and the establishment of Forest Park. In 1866, the Quinette Cemetery was built, which is one of the five historic African American burial grounds in the St. Louis area.

The original town plat including quarter section blocks, and families could buy a block estate of 5 acres (20,000 m^{2}). Deed restrictions prohibited industrial development.

== Traditions and cultural institutions ==
The Greentree Festival is held every September at Kirkwood Park for three days. It offers arts and crafts for kids, live musical performances, and a diverse set of vendors selling arts, crafts, food, and drink. The Greentree Festival Parade is held on the Saturday morning of the fair's weekend and usually draws large crowds. The festival was conceived in 1961 to raise funds to replace the drought-stricken trees in the park.

Kirkwood Park itself is a 92-acre park located just south of the center of town. It features a wide variety of attractions including an amphitheater which hosts summer concerts, a lake stocked with fish, walking trails, racquet sport courts, competition and recreational swimming pools, a pistol range, and a community center featuring an ice arena and indoor multipurpose hall. Organizations which call the Kirkwood Ice Arena home include the Gateway Speed Skating Club, Kirkwood Figure Skating Club, Kirkwood Stars youth hockey club, and Kirkwood High's hockey program; future NHL stars who first skated at the rink include Pat LaFontaine and Ben Bishop.

The Kirkwood High School Pioneers and Webster Groves Statesmen alternate as hosts of the annual Turkey Day Game, the longest-running football high school Thanksgiving Day rivalry west of the Mississippi. The 100th anniversary game was in 2007. The winner of the Turkey Day Game receives the Frisco Bell, while the loser gets the Little Brown Jug. The two schools also founded the first championship of St. Louis County in football St. Louis County Football Conference Champions.

Kirkwood Station, the train station of Richardsonian Romanesque architectural style was built in 1893. Listed on the National Register of Historic Places (NRHP), it has become a symbol of the town. It is the only station stop that Amtrak makes in the St. Louis metropolitan area outside the central city. Among the other buildings in Kirkwood listed on the NRHP is a Frank Lloyd Wright house in Ebsworth Park Foundation.

In 1895, the Meramec Highlands resort was built on the bluffs above the Meramec River.

The annual Route 66 Cars and Guitars Festival takes place on the first Saturday in June; the famed highway ran through the city as part of multiple alignments throughout its history. Kirkwood Road through the center of town is blocked off for a classic car show with prizes in multiple categories, several stages are set up hosting live music, and there are other activities for children and adults alike.

The National Museum of Transportation is a private, 42-acre transportation museum in Kirkwood. Founded in 1944, it restores, preserves, and displays a wide variety of vehicles spanning 15 decades of American history: cars, boats, aircraft, and in particular, locomotives and railroad equipment from around the United States.

The Kirkwood Farmers' Market was founded in 1976. The outdoor market offers a variety of homegrown vegetables and fruits. More than 300 local businesses contribute to the market.

The Magic House, St. Louis Children's Museum in Kirkwood has become a popular family attraction for the region. Opened in 1979, it receives over 500,000 visitors annually and has been visited by more than 10 million people. The museum's original building was built in 1901 and has undergone several renovations and expansions. The Magic House was ranked by Zagat as America's top travel destination based on child appeal.

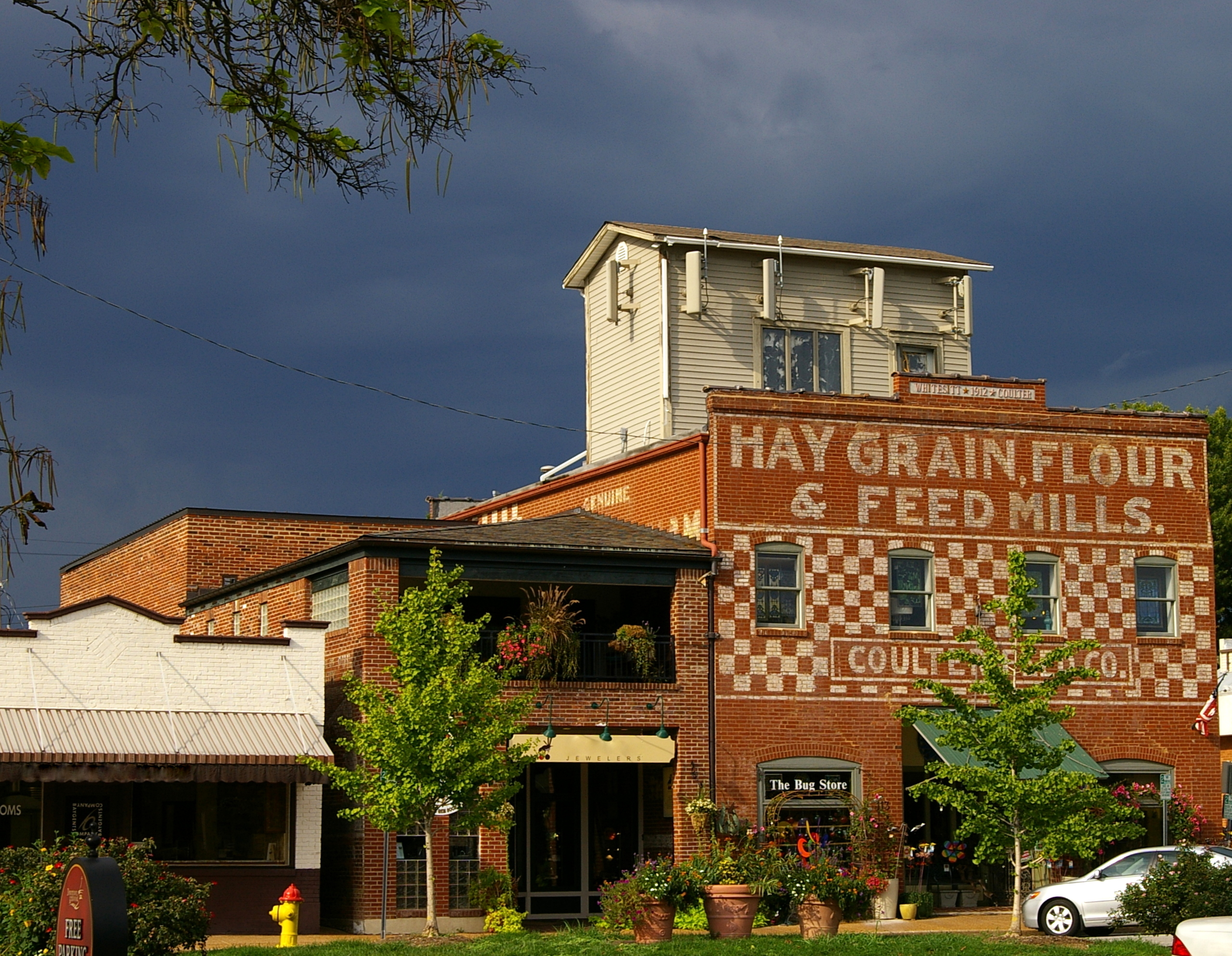
Kirkwood Historic District

Kirkwood won the Arbor Day Growth Award in 1993, 1997, 2003, and 2004. The city also won the America in Bloom 2007 Community Involvement Criteria Award.

== Geography ==
According to the United States Census Bureau, the city has a total area of 9.20 square miles (23.83 km^{2}), of which 9.16 square miles (23.72 km^{2}) is land and 0.04 square miles (0.10 km^{2}) is water.

== Demographics ==
Historical population
Census	Pop.	Note	%±
1880	1,280		—
1890	1,777		38.8%
1900	2,825		59.0%
1910	4,171		47.6%
1920	4,422		6.0%
1930	9,169		107.3%
1940	12,132		32.3%
1950	18,640		53.6%
1960	29,421		57.8%
1970	31,679		7.7%
1980	27,739		−12.4%
1990	27,291		−1.6%
2000	27,324		0.1%
2010	27,540		0.8%
2020	29,461		7.0%
U.S. Decennial Census

=== 2020 census ===
As of the 2020 census, Kirkwood had a population of 29,461 and 12,376 households; there were 7,331 families and a population density of 3,209.3 per square mile (1,238.9/km^{2}). There were 13,106 housing units, of which 5.6% were vacant. The homeowner vacancy rate was 1.3% and the rental vacancy rate was 6.6%. The median age was 42.1 years. 24.1% of residents were under the age of 18 and 21.4% were 65 years of age or older. For every 100 females there were 88.6 males, and for every 100 females age 18 and over there were 83.4 males age 18 and over. About 29.6% of households had children under the age of 18 living in them. Of all households, 50.4% were married-couple households, 14.4% were households with a male householder and no spouse or partner present, and 30.9% were households with a female householder and no spouse or partner present. About 33.4% of all households were made up of individuals and 17.6% had someone living alone who was 65 years of age or older. The average household size was 2.4 and the average family size was 3.1. 100.0% of residents lived in urban areas, while 0.0% lived in rural areas.

Racial composition as of the 2020 census
Race	Number	Percent
White	25,357	86.1%
Black or African American	1,673	5.7%
American Indian and Alaska Native	46	0.2%
Asian	458	1.6%
Native Hawaiian and Other Pacific Islander	10	0.0%
Some other race	237	0.8%
Two or more races	1,680	5.7%
Hispanic or Latino (of any race)	820	2.8%

=== 2016–2020 American Community Survey ===
The 2016–2020 5-year American Community Survey estimates show that the median household income was $94,067 (with a margin of error of +/- $8,648) and the median family income was $124,621 (+/- $5,061). Males had a median income of $69,286 (+/- $9,346) versus $42,067 (+/- $4,359) for females. The median income for those above 16 years old was $51,627 (+/- $3,485). Approximately, 2.9% of families and 4.8% of the population were below the poverty line, including 5.5% of those under the age of 18 and 4.5% of those ages 65 or over.

=== 2010 census ===
As of the census of 2010, there were 27,540 people in Kirkwood, 11,894 households, and 7,327 families residing in the city. The population density was 3,006.6 inhabitants per square mile (1,160.9/km^{2}). The racial makeup of the city was 89.4% White, 7.0% African American, 0.13% Native American, 1.4% Asian, 0.42% another race.

There were 11,894 households, of which 29.3% had children under the age of 18 living with them, 48.7% were married couples living together, 9.9% had a female householder with no husband present, 2.9% had a male householder with no wife present, and 38.4% were non-families. 33.6% of all households were made up of individuals, and 14.4% had someone living alone who was 65 years of age or older. The average household size was 2.29 and the average family size was 2.97.

The median age in the city was 42.6 years. 23.2% of residents were under the age of 18; 6.1% were between the ages of 18 and 24; 23.8% were from 25 to 44; 29.8% were from 45 to 64; and 17.1% were 65 years of age or older. The gender makeup of the city was 46.0% male and 54.0% female.

=== 2000 census ===
In 2000 there were 11,763.5 households, out of which 28.0% had children under the age of 18 living with them, 50.5% were married couples living together, 9.0% had a female householder with no husband present, and 38.3% were non-families. 33.5% of all households were made up of individuals, and 14.9% had someone living alone who was 65 years of age or older. The average household size was 2.29 and the average family size was 2.98.

In the city, the population was spread out, with 23.4% under the age of 18, 5.9% from 18 to 24, 27.6% from 25 to 44, 24.9% from 45 to 64, and 18.2% who were 65 years of age or older. The median age was 41 years. For every 100 females, there were 84.1 males. For every 100 females age 18 and over, there were 79.4 males.

The median income for a household in the city was $70,261, and the median income for a family was $89,219. Males had a median income of $51,515 versus $36,235 for females. The per capita income for the city was $32,012. About 2.8% of families and 4.6% of the population were below the poverty line, including 6.1% of those under age 18 and 3.6% of those age 65 or over.

== Crime ==
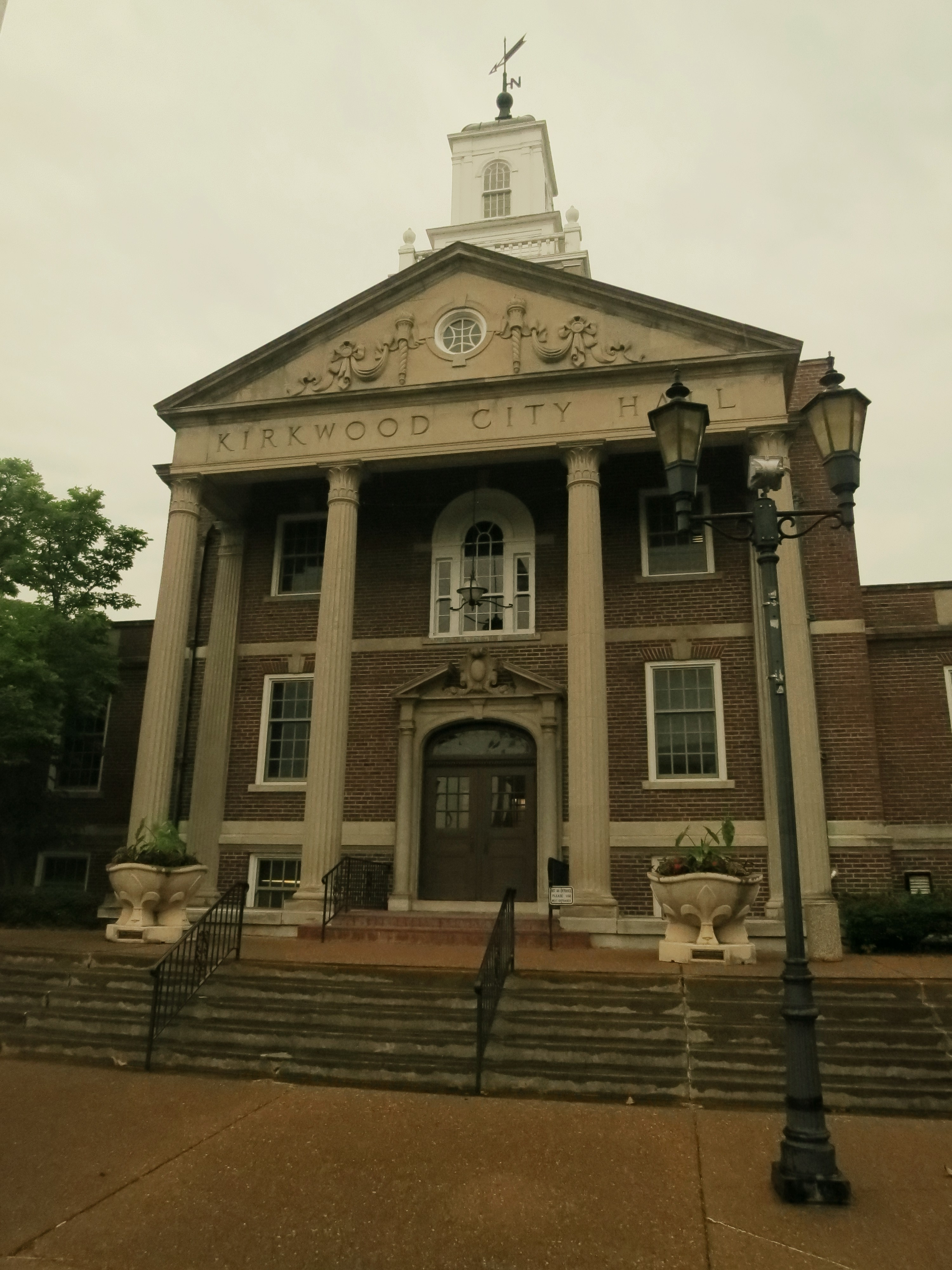
Kirkwood City Hall, where a spree shooting occurred in 2008

In 2005, 2007 and 2008, Kirkwood was the site of three sensational events. On July 5, 2005, Kevin Johnson Jr. shot and killed Sgt. William McEntee, who was investigating a fireworks call when Johnson walked up and shot him several times. Johnson was upset with police because he thought that they were responsible for his younger brother's death (although the brother died from a heart condition). He was executed for the crime on November 29, 2022.

On January 12, 2007, Michael J. Devlin was arrested for abducting 13-year-old William "Ben" Ownby. Police had discovered that Ownby and also 15-year-old Shawn Hornbeck lived in Devlin's apartment. Hornbeck had been missing since he was 11 years old, when he was abducted from near his home in Richwoods, Missouri. The Shawn Hornbeck Foundation was set up to find him as well as other missing children.

On February 7, 2008, Kirkwood resident Charles L. "Cookie" Thornton shot many people at a Kirkwood city council session, killing five – Council Members Connie Karr and Michael H.T. Lynch, Public Works Director Kenneth Yost, and police officers Sgt. William Biggs and Tom Ballman. Sgt. Biggs was killed in the lot of a nearby Imo's Pizza restaurant. Thornton stole his gun and proceeded to enter the City Hall. Once inside, he killed Officer Ballman and opened fire on the city council. Kirkwood mayor Mike Swoboda and Suburban Journals reporter Todd Smith were injured. The gunman had a history of disruptive behavior and legal actions against the city government, related to ordinance violations and other issues with the police and the city council. Thornton was shot to death by additional police officers, all of whom responded after one of the fatally shot officers was able to activate his emergency signal by radio. Within minutes, multiple officers were on the scene. Mayor Swoboda died on September 6, 2008, succumbing to cancer in addition to complications from the February shootings.

== Transportation ==
=== Rail ===
Kirkwood sits along the Jefferson City Subdivision of the Union Pacific Railroad. Passenger rail service is provided by Amtrak. Kirkwood Station is located near the center of downtown Kirkwood and is a stop for Amtrak's Missouri River Runner.

=== Bus ===
Bus service in Kirkwood is provided by MetroBus. Service connects Kirkwood to other suburban communities and downtown St. Louis.

=== Road ===
Interstate Highway 270 runs along the western edge of Kirkwood. Interstate 44 passes through the community along the southern portions of the city limits. Major surface streets include Manchester Road (Missouri Route 100) bordering the city to the north, and US 61/67 (Lindbergh Boulevard) which runs north–south through downtown Kirkwood as Kirkwood Road.

== Education ==
=== Primary and secondary schools ===
Public education in Kirkwood falls under the Kirkwood R-7 School District. The district covers all of Kirkwood as well as all or parts of the neighboring smaller communities of Des Peres, Frontenac, Glendale, Huntleigh, Oakland, and Warson Woods.

The district includes five elementary schools (Tillman Elementary, North Glendale Elementary, Keysor Elementary, Robinson Elementary, and Westchester Elementary); two middle schools (Nipher Middle School and North Kirkwood Middle school); and one high school, Kirkwood High School. (The high school was established in 1865 and was originally located in the building that houses Nipher Middle School.) Upon graduation from elementary school, students from North Glendale, Robinson, and half of Tillman go to Nipher Middle School, and students from Keysor, Westchester, and the other half of Tillman go to North Kirkwood Middle School.

Kirkwood contains two Catholic elementary schools, Saint Gerard Majella and Saint Peter.

St. John Vianney High School, a private Catholic school, is also located in Kirkwood.

=== Colleges and universities ===
St. Louis Community College (STLCC) operates a 78-acre (320,000 m^{2}) campus in Kirkwood, STLCC-Meramec. It is the largest community college in Missouri, with over 12,000 undergraduate and transfer students.

=== Public library ===
Kirkwood has a lending library, the Kirkwood Public Library.

== Religious organizations ==
Kirkwood is the world headquarters of the Lutheran Church–Missouri Synod, a confessional Lutheran denomination with slightly under 2 million members.

== Notable people ==
- Scott Bakula, actor
- Mel Bay, author and musician
- Joe Boever, Major League Baseball (MLB) pitcher
- Alan Bovik, Primetime Emmy-winning engineering professor
- Dylan Brady, musician
- Benjamin Gratz Brown, U.S. Senator and 20th Governor of Missouri
- Jack Buechner (1940–2020), former member, U.S. House of Representatives (1987 to 1991)
- Edgar W. Denison, naturalist and author
- Michael J. Devlin, convicted child molester and kidnapper
- Nikki Glaser, comedian
- Trent Green, National Football League (NFL) player
- Geoffrey C. Hazard Jr., law professor
- Cactus Keck, MLB player and Kirkwood Fire Chief
- Spike Kohlbecker, racing driver
- Jeremy Maclin, NFL player
- Claire McCaskill, NBC News/MSNBC political analyst, former U.S. Senator
- Marianne Moore (1887–1972), poet and writer
- Bill Pleis, MLB player
- Rodger O. Riney, broker and business executive
- David Sanborn, musician
- Dorsey Schroeder, racing driver
- Slayyyter, singer
- Al Smith, MLB player
- Rick Stream, former Missouri state representative
- Brandon Williams, NFL player
- Kyren Williams, NFL player
- Mike Wood, NFL player

== See also ==
- National Register of Historic Places listings in St. Louis County, Missouri
