= Webster Groves High School =

Public high school in Webster Groves, Missouri, United States

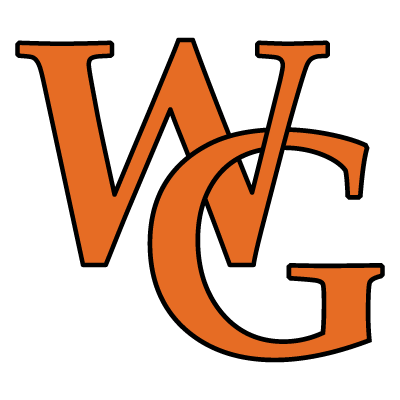

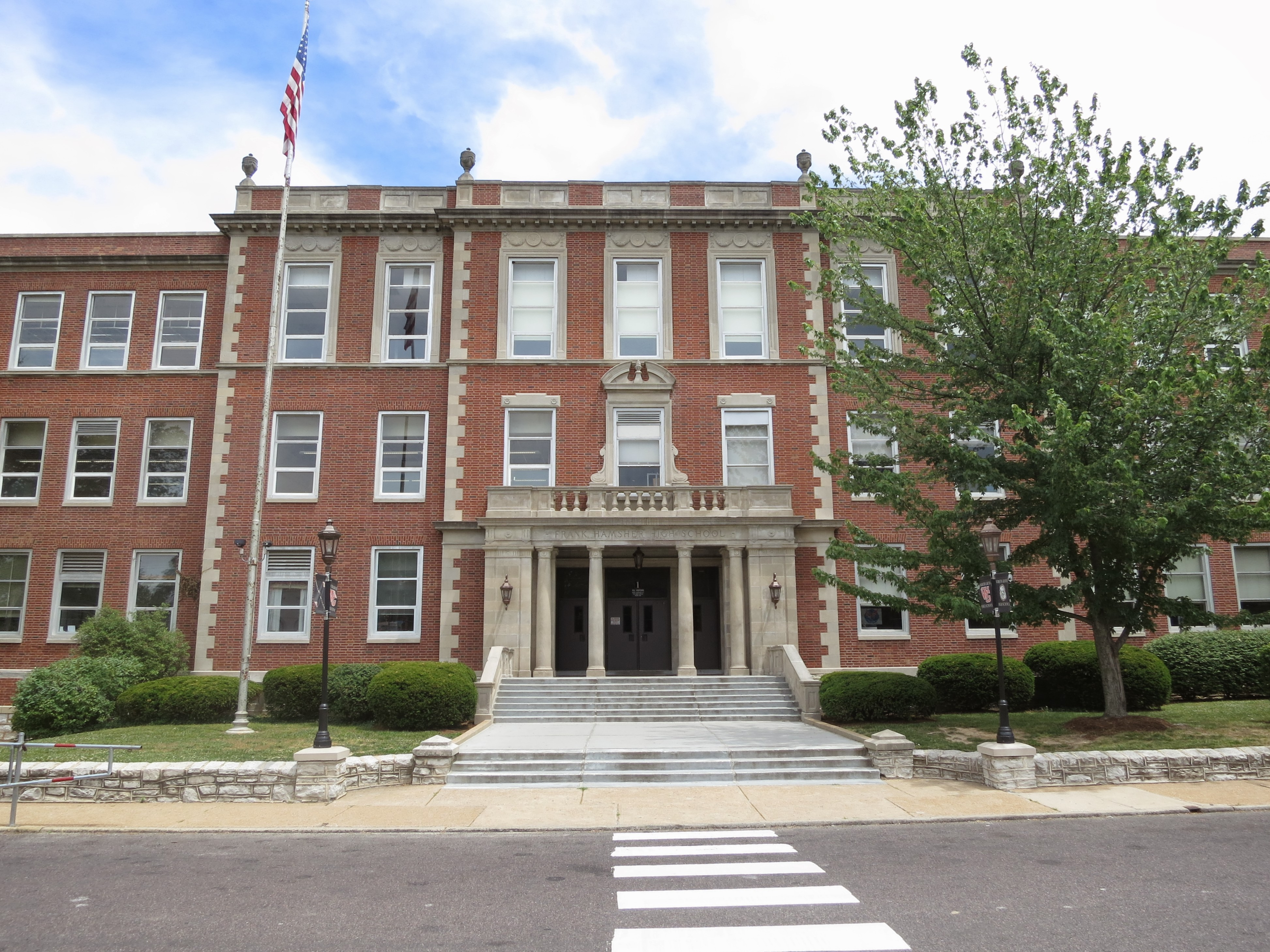
- Senior entrance

Location
- 100 Selma Avenue; Webster Groves, Missouri 63119; United States; 38.5901°N 90.3483°W

Information
- Former names: Webster School (1889–1927); Gray Avenue School (Unofficial, 1889–1906); Frank Hamsher High School (1927–1956)
- Type: Public secondary
- Established: 1889; 137 years ago
- School district: Webster Groves School District
- CEEB code: 263573
- Principal: Tony Gragnani
- Teaching staff: 89.10 (FTE)
- Grades: 9–12
- Enrollment: 1,253 (2024–25)
- Student to teacher ratio: 14.06
- Colors: Orange and black
- Fight song: On With Webster
- Athletics: MSHSAA - Varsity and Junior Varsity
- Athletics conference: Suburban Conference
- Team name: Statesmen
- Rival: Kirkwood High School
- Newspaper: The Echo
- Website: hs.webster.k12.mo.us

Webster Groves High School is a public high school school in Webster Groves, Missouri, United States. It is located at 100 Selma Ave, Webster Groves, MO. The school is part of the Webster Groves School District.

== History ==
Webster Groves High School was established in 1889 as a ninth-grade course. The school originally occupied the first floor of the white frame Bristol School building, then known as Webster School, or sometimes the Gray Avenue School; the elementary school occupied the second floor. George L. Hawkins was the principal.

As enrollment increased, the high school used hallways and storerooms as supplementary classrooms. Eventually, it rented space in the Congregational Church and the Brannon Building. In 1905, the entire high school was moved to the second floor of the Brannon Building.

In 1905, citizens recognized the need for a new high school and voted for a $40,000 bond issue to purchase the site at 100 Selma Avenue and construct the school. The building faced Selma Avenue but was closer to Bradford Avenue. It was set far back from the street and was very long and narrow, likely built in a style similar to the Bristol Elementary School building. The high school building was completed in 1907, while businessman Robert A. Holekamp briefly served as district superintendent. That same year, science classes in physics and astronomy were offered, becoming the first elective courses.

The high school was initially a two-story brick building with three classrooms and an auditorium. In 1914, two wings were added: a south wing for a gymnasium and a north wing for an auditorium, 12 classrooms, and a girls' gymnasium. In 1917, an armory for the Home Guard was created behind the school, which was eventually given to the high school and used as a lunchroom and a gymnasium for seniors. James Hixson served as the first principal from 1907 to 1943.

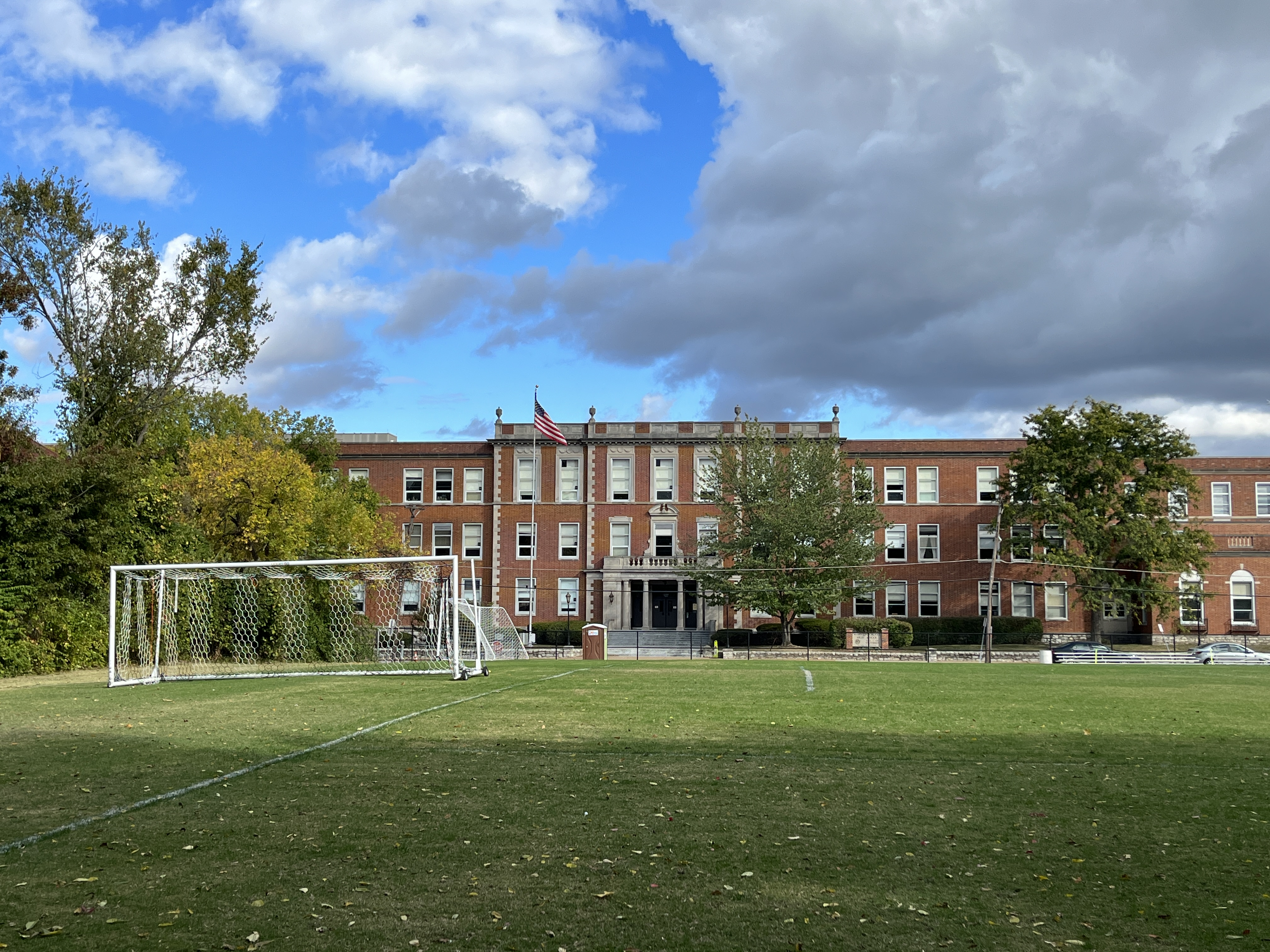
The senior entrance of Webster Groves High School, completed in 1927. Photo taken 2023.

In the 1920s, a three-story section and the city's public library were added just north of this building. In 1925, a bond issue provided funding to completely renovate the school. A new section specifically intended for senior students in grades 9–12 was completed on October 6, 1927, and was named Frank Hamsher High School, after the school district's fourth superintendent, who had died in 1924. This addition contained a double-level auditorium, gymnasium, and nine classrooms, and is referred to as the senior entrance.

The second part of the plan involved constructing another section south of the new building, called the junior entrance. The original building was used for junior students in grades 6–8 from 1927 until 1935, when it was either demolished or left behind the 1935 section. This new addition contained 28 classrooms for subjects such as drama and science, family and consumer sciences (FACS) rooms, and art rooms. It also added the Little Theater, which was modeled after the Yale Repertory Theater of the time, with drama and music rooms above it.

Sometime in the 1940s or 1950s, an autobody shop was built in the northeast corner of the high school property to serve auto maintenance classes. It was constructed as a separate building that could house small cars or large semi-trucks. In the mid-1970s, an indoor walkway was constructed between the main building and this sub-building.

In 1947, the armory building behind the school was replaced by Roberts Gym, named after Charles A. Roberts, who coached and taught at the school for 39 years. The main entrance of this building was on the ground floor facing Bradford Avenue and led into the cafeteria.

Howard Latta was principal from 1943 to 1968. WGHS was racially integrated in 1956, two years after Brown v Board of Education, bringing in students from Douglass High School. In 1966, a two-story elevated wing was added to the back of the building, containing classrooms for mathematics and world languages. It enclosed a large section of the courtyard while still allowing students to travel underneath it. The Herbert Schooling Library was donated around this time. Jerry Knight was principal from 1969 to 1986. The main auditorium within the senior entrance is named after him.

The main common area, used largely for lunch, was built under the two-story section in 2002. It was named P.V. Commons after Patricia Voss, principal from 1994 to 2003, who had previously served as an assistant principal since 1977. In October 2002, a white powdery substance found in a tissue box provoked a two-hour lockdown; investigators later determined the substance was not anthrax.

The Webster Groves School Board appointed Jon Clark as principal in 2003; he had previously served as an assistant principal at the high school for seven years.

In 2010, an old section of the school building (possibly the original high school building) was demolished to construct an auxiliary gym between Roberts Gym and the Junior Entrance.

In 2011, construction began on a 106,000-square-foot addition to the school. At that time, the old auto maintenance shop and a small original north wing were demolished to make room for the expansion. A temporary auto maintenance shop was set up under the 1966 section of the building, where plywood walls remained as of 2025. The major addition was completed in 2012. It included new classrooms, science laboratories, a main band room, private practice rooms, art studios, industrial technology classrooms, and an autobody shop in the basement. New rooms for the social studies department, utility rooms, and a loading dock were also included.

A car elevator was constructed to transport vehicles to the basement auto maintenance shop. The roof of the building features a vegetation courtyard, and three 20,000-gallon water harvesting tanks were installed at the base of the building for rain collection and irrigation of the adjacent field. The expansion was designed to resemble the existing building, including terrazzo floors and steps and limestone accents. The old gymnasium behind Knight Auditorium was sectioned off during this process and now houses drama department rooms and a black box theater.

On January 30, 2026, More than 1,000 students from the High School and Hixson Middle School marched the Webster Groves sidewalks to protest U.S. Immigration and Customs Enforcement (ICE), and the students’ goal is to meet with the mayor of Webster Groves Laura Arnold at City Hall. The school administrators were following them off campus to make sure the students were safe, along with the public safety of Webster Groves keeping eyes on the students. The school administrators said there are consequences for skipping classes. The Webster Groves School District said that students involved in this event will be marked as an unexcused absent for skipping classes which is in accordance to the attendance policy.

== Campus ==
The Webster Groves High School building has approximately 130 classrooms along with an auditorium, a media center, and a theater. It has a soccer field to the west and a baseball/softball field to the east. Moss Field, the football stadium, is located at Hixson Middle School at 630 South Elm Avenue, a short drive from the high school. The field was built in 1946 and has been renovated several times. It now has locker rooms, bleachers, lights and an all-weather track. As of 2025, it has undergone a full transformation, including an eight lane track, turf field, concession stands, locker rooms and restrooms, concrete seating, and a video scoreboard.

== Academics ==
24 credits are required to graduate from Webster Groves High School as of established by the Missouri State Board of Education and the Webster Groves School District Board of Education.

The 8-semester planned coursework career of high school required students to have 4 credits of English (Lit and Composition, Writing, Speech, Journalism), 3 credits of Mathematics (Geometry, Algebra, Trig, Pre-Calculus), Science (Biology, Chemistry, AP, Forensic Science, Zoology), and Social Studies (World Civ, US History, US Government, Psychology, American Military History), 1 of Fine Arts (such as Art, Drama, or Music), 1 of Practical Arts (such as Business, Family and Consumer Sciences, or Industrial Technology), 1 of Physical Education, 0.5 of health, (Incl. Weight training, Kinetic wellness, Athletic training) and 1 Personal Finance course, combined with 7.5 elective credits.

== Athletics ==
Webster Groves High School sponsors a number of different sports, including football (men's), tennis, field hockey, soccer (men's and women's), basketball (men's and women's), baseball (men's), softball (women's), golf (men's and women's), track and field (men's and women's), swimming (men's and women's), and lacrosse (men’s and women's). Ice hockey and men's lacrosse are non-affiliate sports at the high school.

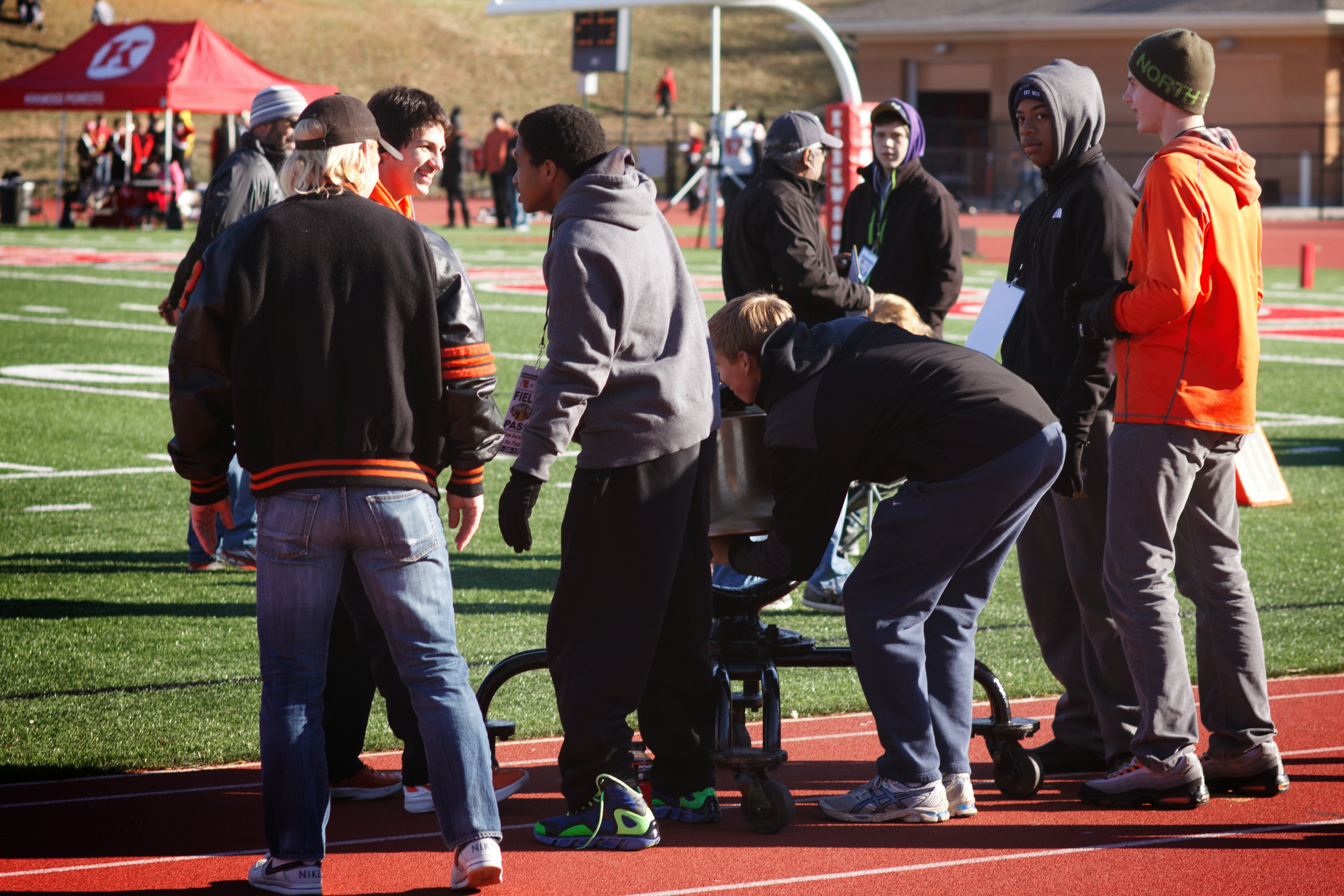
Students ring the Frisco Bell at the 2013 Turkey Day game.

The Turkey Day football game is an annual game held on Thanksgiving Day between Webster Groves High School and its longtime rival, Kirkwood High School. The rivalry between the two schools is the oldest current Thanksgiving Day rivalry west of the Mississippi River. The location of the game alternates each year between Webster’s Moss Field (on even numbered years) and Kirkwood’s Lyon’s Memorial field (on odd numbered years). A number of festivities surround the game, including a shared dance and a separate bonfire and pep rally at each school. It began in 1928 and is the longest running classic west of the Mississippi. The winner of each year's game is presented with the Frisco Bell, a bell from a train donated by the Frisco Railroad line and the losers get the Little Brown Jug. In 2007, the 100th year of Turkey Day Game was celebrated but it was actually the celebration of the first championship in St. Louis County for football St. Louis County Football Conference Champions, the game attendance exceeding 12,000 fans.

=== State championship history ===
Sport	State Championships
Baseball	
Boys' Basketball	1996, 2008, 2017, 2018, 2022, 2025
Girls' Basketball	
Boys' Cross Country	
Football	1979, 1988, 2002, 2009
Boys' Golf	1947, 1951, 1954, 2022
Girls' Golf	1983, 1984
Girls' Lacrosse	
Scholar Bowl	
Boys' Soccer	2014, 2015, 2022
Girls' Soccer	2017
Softball	2020
Boys' Swimming	1967, 1968, 1970
Girls' Swimming	
Girls' Tennis	
Boys' Track	1931, 2025
Girls' Track	
Boys' Volleyball	
Boys’ Tennis	1941, 1942, 1943, 1957, 1958, 1959
Wrestling	

== Student life ==
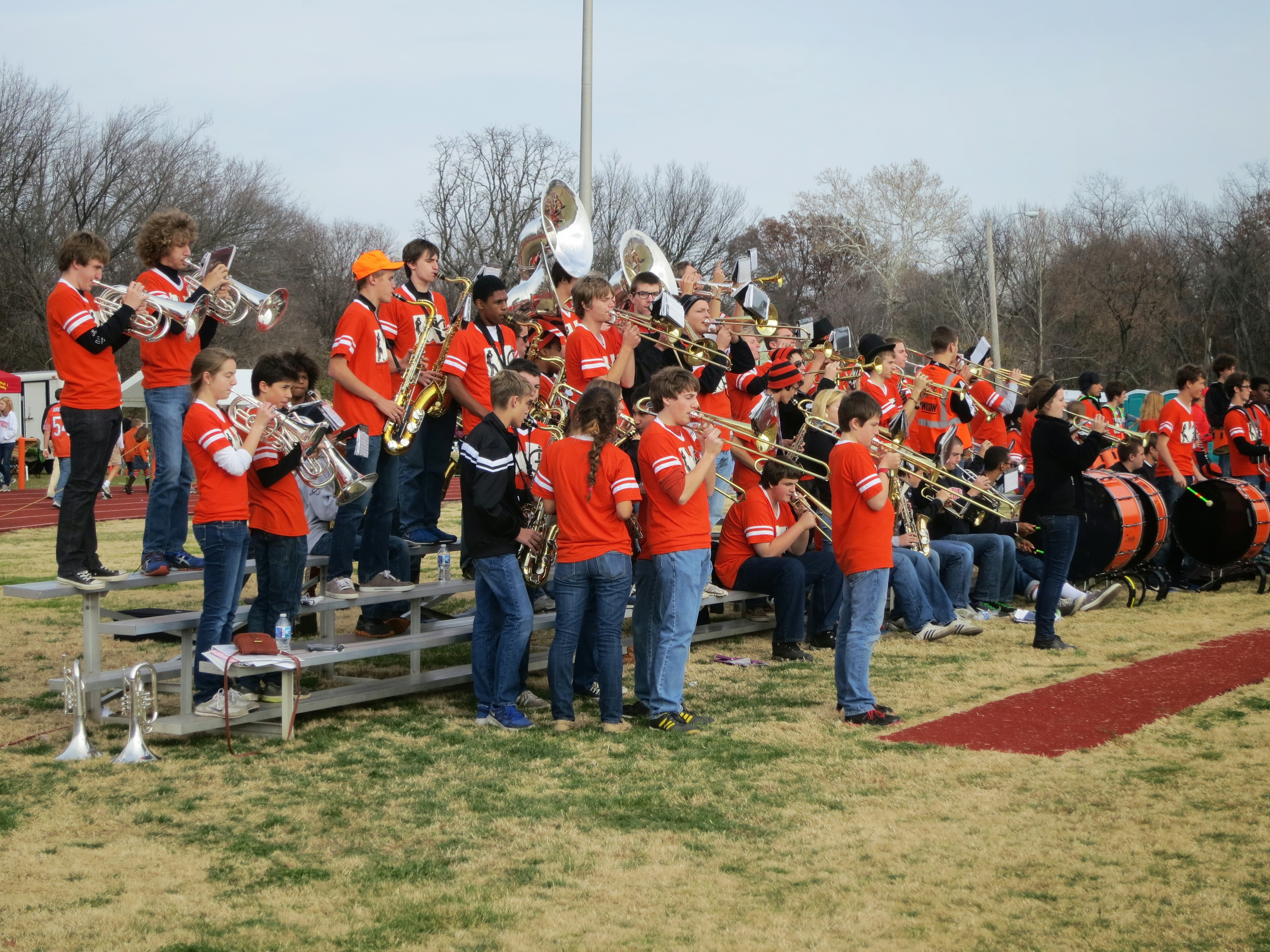
Webster Groves High School marching band at the 2012 Turkey Day game vs Kirkwood at Moss Field.

Webster Groves High School offers over 60 clubs for its students to participate in, covering a wide range of student interests. Students may organize their own clubs as long as they are accompanied by a faculty sponsor and chartered by the student council.

Webster Groves High School is a closed campus for grades 9–10. Juniors and seniors are given the privilege to leave campus during their lunch hour, with juniors being given said privilege more recently. If juniors and seniors return to campus late after a 27-minute lunch break, they will receive consequences from the handbook and will receive a detention.

=== Fight song ===
Webster Groves High School's current fight song is "On With Webster", which has the same melody and similar lyrics as that of the University of Wisconsin. The song's first verse is most often performed instrumentally by the school band at assemblies and sporting events.

The school officially still has an alma mater, though it has fallen out of disuse since the 1910s and is almost completely unknown to students today. It praises the school's intellect, safety, and home town from the perspective of an alumnus reminiscing about their time in school.

== Media references ==
In 1966, CBS produced an award winning documentary called 16 In Webster Groves, which was about the lives of students in Webster Groves.

In 1996, then-President Bill Clinton came to the school to recognize the Webster Groves School District’s work towards preventing drugs and violence among its students.

In 1999, TIME magazine devoted a cover story to a week at Webster Groves High School. The magazine stated that "TIME chose Webster Groves, a suburb of St. Louis, MO, in part because it has not been benighted by violence.

== Notable alumni ==
- Bud Byerly, former Major League Baseball player, (St. Louis Cardinals)
- Harry Caray, former Major League Baseball broadcaster, (St. Louis Cardinals, St. Louis Browns, Oakland Athletics, Chicago White Sox, Chicago Cubs)
- Skip Caray, former Major League Baseball broadcaster, (Atlanta Braves)
- Rick Cash, former National Football League player, (Atlanta Falcons, Los Angeles Rams, New England Patriots)
- Adrian Clayborn, former National Football League player, (Tampa Bay Buccaneers, Atlanta Falcons, New England Patriots, Cleveland Browns)
- Ivory Crockett, former sprinter
- Bob Dotson, TV journalist (NBC)
- Steve Ewing, lead singer of The Urge
- Peter Fairbanks, MLB player (Texas Rangers, Tampa Bay Rays)
- Jonathan Franzen, author
- Kimberly Gardner, Circuit Attorney for the City of St. Louis
- Charlie James, former MLB player (St. Louis Cardinals, Cincinnati Reds)
- Ann J. Johanson, pediatric endocrinologist
- Karlie Kloss, supermodel; class of 2011
- Jim Krebs, former NBA player (Los Angeles Lakers)
- Laura Les, class of 2013, musician and member of 100 gecs
- Scott Mayfield, hockey player, 34th overall selection by New York Islanders in 2011 NHL entry draft
- John P. McKay, Historian and author.
- Russ Mitchell, journalist, former CBS News anchor and current WKYC lead anchor
- Bob Sadowski, former MLB player (St. Louis Cardinals, Philadelphia Phillies, Chicago White Sox, Los Angeles)
- Tommy Turner, Olympic sprinter
