= 16 in Webster Groves =

- Narrated by: Charles Kuralt
- Country of origin: United States

Production
- Producer: Arthur Barron
- Production company: CBS News

Original release
- Network: CBS
- Release: 1966

16 in Webster Groves is a 1966 documentary TV special produced by CBS News focusing on the experiences of adolescents growing up and living in Webster Groves, Missouri, United States.

Produced by Arthur Barron and narrated by Charles Kuralt, the program was inspired by a survey conducted by the University of Chicago. It showed the middle-American, middle class town to be a superficially friendly, prosperous, progressive, religious, charitable, arts-and-education oriented bedroom community whose adolescent culture, with the complicity (and, by inference, example and encouragement) of the adult population, was in fact clique-ridden, status-oriented, hypercompetitive, hypocritical, prejudiced, and materialistic. In stark contrast to the popular view in the mid-1960s that young people were rebelling against the values of their parents, the program depicted the Webster Groves teenagers as unimaginative and conformist. One sixteen-year-old girl, for example, declares that her dream is to live in a house down the street from the one she lives in now. That interview, and others with a cross section of sixteen-year-olds in the community, including minorities and exchange students, and consensual filming of their normal activities, both in school and at recreation, provided the content of the program.

A 2006 retrospective article in the local newspaper Riverfront Times indicated that, after the documentary aired, many the town's citizens felt that their community had been unfairly portrayed. For example, when the documentary showed students running away from school in an apparent eagerness to leave, it was not mentioned that they were actually rushing out to see the CBS helicopter. Another time when the students were all portrayed as depressed, the real reason for that depression was not mentioned (the funeral of a popular student). However, in CBS's follow up program they addressed this as a persistent rumour and said, in fact, that the scene had been shot three weeks after the funeral. Writer Jonathan Franzen, who was 16 in Webster Groves about ten years after the program aired, said "[T]he Webster Groves depicted in it bears minimal resemblance to the friendly, unpretentious town I knew when I was growing up. But it’s useless to contradict TV...".

In response to the protest, CBS returned to Webster Groves and made a follow-up, 16 In Webster Groves Revisited, which was essentially the same material with some added footage of residents venting. In the sequel, Kuralt said "One sociologist suggested we ought to call it Forty in Webster Groves."
