= Kirkwood High School =

Public school in Missouri, United States

Location
- 801 W Essex Avenue; Kirkwood, Missouri 63122; United States; 38°35′29″N 90°25′24″W

Information
- Type: Public high school
- Established: 1896; 130 years ago
- School district: Kirkwood R-7
- Principal: Seth Harrell
- Teaching staff: 115.40 (on an FTE basis)
- Grades: 9–12
- Student to teacher ratio: 14.67
- Campus size: 47 acres (190,000 m^{2})
- Campus type: Suburban
- Colors: Red and white
- Athletics conference: Suburban Conference
- Nickname: Pioneers
- Rival: Webster Groves High School
- Newspaper: The Kirkwood Call
- Website: khs.kirkwoodschools.org

Kirkwood High School is a public secondary school in Kirkwood, Missouri, United States. The school is part of the Kirkwood School District.

== History ==
Kirkwood High School as an academic institution dates back to 1865, when the Kirkwood School District was founded. A temporary building opened in the fall of 1866; high school and elementary students attended school together. Jefferson Avenue School was the district's first formal school and was built in 1869. The Booker T. Washington School, which opened in 1869 at 430 West Adams Avenue near Geyer Road was built for African-American students to attend. In 1888, the district built the Adams Avenue School next to the Jefferson School, which offered a two-year high school program for White students completing elementary grades. In 1896, Kirkwood offered the first four-year high school program in St. Louis County; 10 students were members of the first graduating class in the spring of 1897. In 1922, a new, four-year high school was built on Kirkwood Road, where Nipher Middle School is currently located.

A new Kirkwood High School opened in 1955 on a 47-acre (190,000 m^{2}) campus and was designed with seven buildings set on a college-like campus. For the first time in the district, both Caucasian and African-American students were permitted to attend school together. Facilities funded by a 1993 tax/bond issue (Proposition I) included the Thomas N. Keating Performance Center (a fine arts complex with an 821-seat theater), and band, art and vocal music classrooms. The privately funded Walker Commons enclosed the theater lobby area connecting the Center to the main campus.

Due to the passage of Proposition I in 2005, a new science building opened in August 2007. The two-story structure measures 51,000 square feet (4,700 m^{2}) and features 15 combined science classrooms/laboratories (five each for chemistry, biology and physics). Each classroom/laboratory averages about 1,500 square feet (140 m^{2}) and was designed to facilitate the movement of students from discussion to hands-on activities. The facility was designed to reflect current research and best practices in science education. The private Kirkwood School District Foundation raised funds to ensure students had the equipment and technology needed to mirror the recommendations in the National Science Foundation report to Congress.

Prop I funded the construction of a new regulation-size gymnasium. Renovation of the existing physical education facility was completed in March 2008. Prop I also funded a variety of infrastructure improvements, including the installation of a new fire alarm, sprinkler system, and a decentralized heating and cooling system. A new football field was finished in 2019, and a new track was finished in 2011.

== Recognition ==
The 2016 Niche report placed the school as the 2nd best public high school in the state and in the ninety-ninth percentile of the 18,841 public high schools in the country. Regarding college readiness, in 2020 GreatSchools gave the school a very high score for its White students but a middling score for its Black students, explaining that large differences between groups suggest that some groups of students may not be getting necessary support. In addition, the report indicated that test scores for low-income students fell below the state average.

Kirkwood High school was featured in CNN's “Heroin: The poisoning of America” and was covered nationally by CNN's Deborah Feyerick. The area of Kirkwood, Missouri was found to have four times the national average of heroin overdoses.

Kirkwood High School was recognized as a National Blue Ribbon school for the 2022-2023 school year.

== Allegations of sexual abuse, permissive district culture ==
In July 2020, multiple allegations began to surface on social media of alleged sexual abuse of students by high school and other personnel dating back to at least the 1990s. Allegations came from more than a dozen former high school students. It was also alleged that the district failed to take appropriate measures to address the incidents and prevent recurrences. Criminal investigations into at least two alleged abusers were begun.

In August 2020, the board of education approved the hiring of the Kansas City firm Encompass Resolution, LLC to analyze and make recommendations about the district's climate related to the reporting and handling of sexual abuse allegations. The company advertises itself as providing "workplace solutions" to "protect your business" and "keep your work environment healthy."

On September 9, 2020, a federal lawsuit was filed against the district and a former employee of the high school. The lawsuit alleges federal civil rights and Title IX violations and estimates that more than 25 district employees have been involved in sexual harassment, abuse, or discrimination against students over the previous 40 years. The suit also alleges that the former employee who is named as a defendant committed sexual assault and battery, although no criminal charges have been filed. The plaintiff's attorney states that the broad goal of the lawsuit is to prevent recurrences of sexually inappropriate behavior.

On September 28, 2020, a different former high school teacher was arrested on five counts of statutory rape and numerous counts of statutory sodomy. He was indicted on October 1. Court documents state the abuse allegedly occurred within the high school building. The teacher had been accused of abuse before. In 1998, the district had allowed him to resign after two high school students separately reported abuse to the school's principal, and the resignation agreement stipulated that no charges be filed, no internal hearing take place, and no board inquiries be pursued. In addition, during the summer of 2020, numerous students had reported to a news outlet their experiences of grooming and abuse by the former employee, with reports to school leaders being made and nothing being done. The case is being handled by the St. Charles County prosecutor's office because of a conflict of interest in the prosecutor's office of the district's county, St. Louis.

On July 16, 2021, a lawsuit was filed in St. Louis County which alleges that a different former Kirkwood High School teacher and coach sexually abused a student in the 1980s. The suit alleges that high school administrators failed to "do anything to investigate, reprimand, deter, remedy and/or punish [the employee's] conduct" and that staff started "openly gossiping, joking, and spreading rumors about Plaintiff" once they became aware of the abuse.

Representatives of Encompass Resolution, LLC presented their findings and recommendations to the district's board of education on June 28, 2021. Their report stated that their analysis found thirty staff members involved in substantiated allegations of sexual misconduct or abuse that extended over more than four decades. The audit found numerous long-standing deficits in the district's culture and climate related to sexual abuse, misconduct, and reporting. These deficits had a significant impact on the affected students. The auditors made numerous recommendations. The report noted that the district has begun acting on at least one of the recommendations.

== Activities ==
=== Boys basketball ===
The program was started by Denver Miller, who coached for forty-three years, earning 790 victories and induction into the Missouri Basketball Hall of Fame. During its history, the team has earned 21 district championships and has advanced to the Show-Me Showdown (Missouri's Final Four) eight times.

=== Football ===
Kirkwood High School's football tradition dates back over a hundred years. In early 2010 construction began to make a new field. After the project was delayed because of the removal of water pipes that were deep in the ground, the first home game on the new Fieldturf was played on October 1. The Kirkwood Pioneers became state champions for the first time in 2012, defeating Fort Osage (Independence, Mo) High School 32-7 to conclude a perfect 13-0 record, a number one ranking in the state of Missouri, and a number seventeen ranking nationally by the USA Today. The Kirkwood Pioneers won their second State Championship in 2016 by defeating Blue Springs High School 31-14.

=== Symphonic orchestra ===
The Kirkwood High School Symphonic Orchestra played at Carnegie Hall in New York City twice. Once in 2010, and again in 2017. In 2013, the group competed in the National Orchestra Cup at Alice Tully Hall in Lincoln Center and earned third place.

=== Mock trial ===
The Kirkwood High School Mock Trial team has won the Missouri High School Mock Trial State Championship in 2018, 2021, and 2022.

=== MSHSAA State Championships ===
- Baseball: 1961
- Girls Basketball: 2017, 2018
- Boys Cross Country: 1962, 1964, 1967, 1968, 1969
- Girls Cross County: 1991
- Football: 2012, 2016
- Boys Swimming and Diving: 1965, 1966, 1972
- Girls Swimming and Diving: 2021
- Boys Tennis: 1978
- Boys Track and Field: 1949, 1959, 1983
- Volleyball: 1996
- Boys Wrestling: 1947

== School profile ==
- Grades: 9–12
- Total enrollment: 1,737 (2023-24 school year)
- Student/teacher ratio: 12.91

== Notable alumni ==
- Scott Bakula, class of 1973, actor
- Dylan Brady, class of 2011, member of musical duo 100 gecs
- John D. Bredehoeft, class of c. 1951, geologist
- Colin Donnell, class of 2001, actor
- Michael R. Gibbons, class of 1977, Missouri State Senator
- Gregory S. Girolami, class of 1974, professor of chemistry, University of Illinois
- Nikki Glaser, class of 2002, comedian
- Marcus Harris, American football player
- Kyle Hawkins, class of 1989, prominent men's lacrosse team coach and gay rights pioneer
- William Inge, class of 1993, Defensive Coordinator for Washington Huskies football
- Cactus Keck, Major League Baseball (MLB) player for the Cincinnati Reds
- Will Lee III, NFL cornerback
- Jay Leeuwenburg, class of 1987, National Football League (NFL) player and author
- Jeremy Maclin, class of 2006, NFL player
- Mike McNeill, NFL football player
- Chase Niece, class of 2017, professional soccer player
- Dustin Nguyen, class of 1980, actor
- Bill Pleis, MLB player for Minnesota Twins
- MyCole Pruitt, class of 2010, NFL tight end
- Ziva Rodann, class of 1951, Israeli-American actress
- David Sanborn, class of 1963, Grammy Award-winning recording artist and musician
- Kalani Sitake, class of 1993, Head Coach for BYU Cougars football
- Slayyyter, class of 2015, singer
- Rick Stream, class of 1967, Missouri House of Representatives
- Jim Talent, class of 1973, Missouri politician
- Susan Tifft, class of 1969, journalist, author, editor, academic
- Lyle Waggoner, class of 1953, actor
- Fred Wellman, class of 1983, future United States Representative for Missouri's 2nd congressional district
- Ron Willis, MLB player
- Mike Wood, NFL player
