= Crestwood, Missouri =

City in St. Louis County, Missouri, United States

- City

- Flag

- Location of Crestwood, Missouri
- Coordinates: 38°33′25″N 90°22′42″W
- Country: United States
- State: Missouri
- County: St. Louis
- Township: Gravois

Area
  - Total: 3.59 sq mi (9.29 km^{2})
  - Land: 3.59 sq mi (9.29 km^{2})
  - Water: 0 sq mi (0.00 km^{2})
- Elevation: 614 ft (187 m)

Population (2020)
  - Total: 12,404
  - Density: 3,459.1/sq mi (1,335.55/km^{2})
- Time zone: UTC-6 (Central (CST))
  - Summer (DST): UTC-5 (CDT)
- ZIP code: 63126 (St. Louis (Sappington))
- FIPS code: 29-17218
- GNIS feature ID: 2393672
- Website: cityofcrestwood.org

Crestwood is a city in Gravois Township, St. Louis County, Missouri, United States, that is part of the Metropolitan Statistical Area known as Greater St. Louis. The population was 12,404 at the 2020 census.

In 2011, Bloomberg Businessweek magazine named Crestwood the "Best Place to Raise Kids in Missouri," lauding the community for top-tier schools and excellent municipal services.

== Geography ==
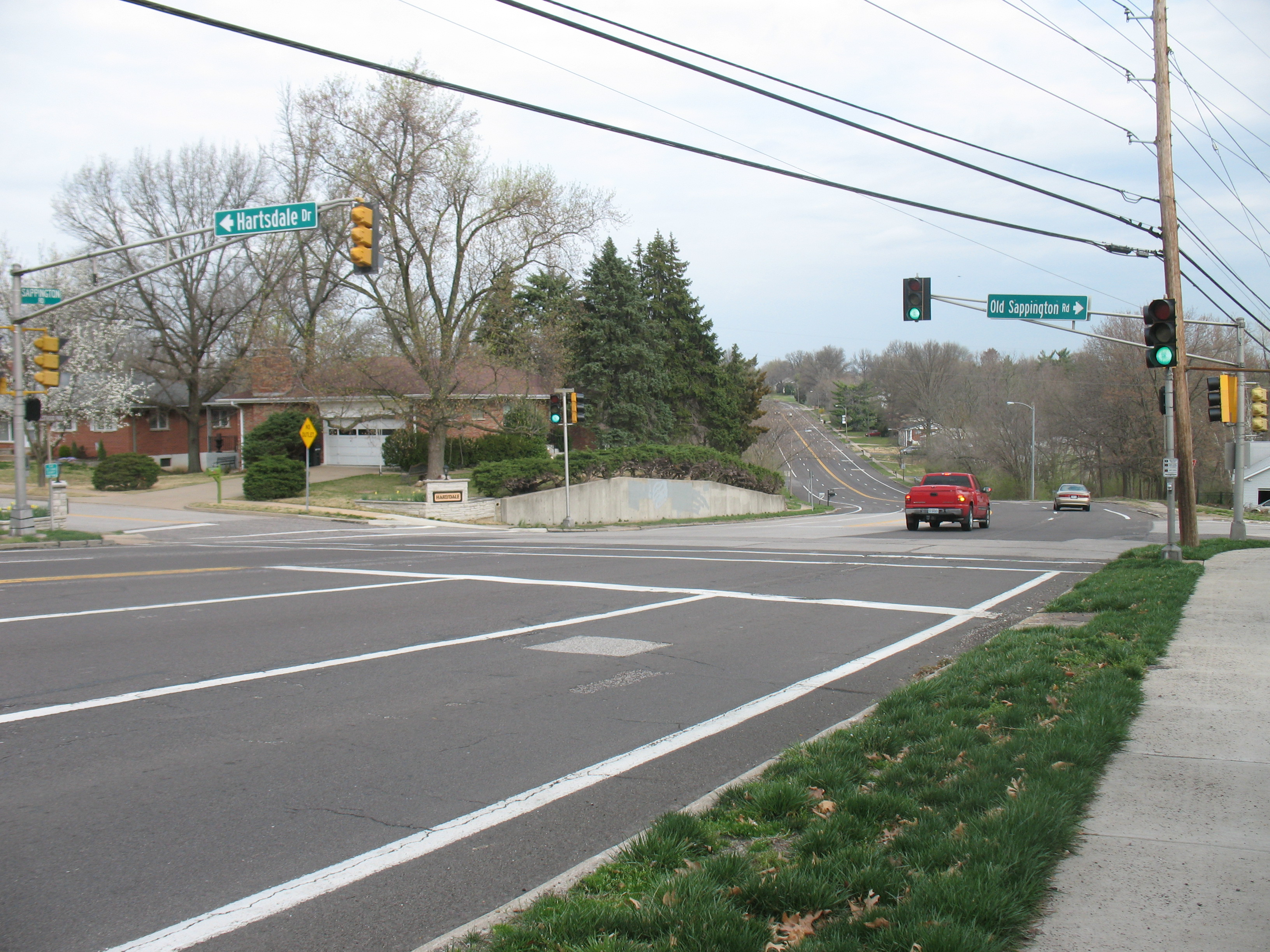
Sappington Road, Crestwood, MO

According to the United States Census Bureau, the city has a total area of 3.60 square miles (9.32 km^{2}), all of it land.

Crestwood is home to seven (7) public parks, including Whitecliff Park, Crestwood Park, Sappington Park, Ferndale Park, Rayburn Park, Sanders Park, and Spellman Park.

Whitecliff Park is the crown jewel of the Crestwood Parks system. The 85-acre park features the Crestwood Community Center and the Crestwood Aquatic Center, a public water park, and the Quarry fishing dock. Additionally, it also houses four tennis courts, a basketball court, walking loop trails, and much more.

Crestwood Park is the City's second largest park, featuring 21 acres of sports fields for softball/baseball and soccer, a new playground, a 9-hole disc golf course, two pavilions, restroom, sledding hill, and a 1.3-mile long walking trail.

Crestwood is the burial place of Sgt. John Sappington. He was a Revolutionary War soldier who was a personal bodyguard to Gen. George Washington at Valley Forge. He was also one of the pioneers at Fort Boonesborough in Madison County, Kentucky. The Sappingtons were large land owners in the area, and Mark and Thomas Sappington's homes still stand in the vicinity. The Sappington Cemetery is maintained by the City of Crestwood, and several Sappington descendants still pass through to maintain the family graves. Crestwood is also the final resting place of Revered Moses Dickson buried in Father Dickson Cemetery and is one of the historic stops along Grant's Trail a biking and walking trail in St. Louis County, Missouri.

== Demographics ==
=== Racial and ethnic composition ===
Crestwood city, Missouri – Racial and ethnic composition Note: the US Census treats Hispanic/Latino as an ethnic category. This table excludes Latinos from the racial categories and assigns them to a separate category. Hispanics/Latinos may be of any race.
Race / Ethnicity (NH = Non-Hispanic)	Pop 2000	Pop 2010	Pop 2020	% 2000	% 2010	% 2020
White alone (NH)	11,356	11,014	10,985	95.73%	92.46%	88.56%
Black or African American alone (NH)	85	189	213	0.72%	1.59%	1.72%
Native American or Alaska Native alone (NH)	19	12	14	0.16%	0.10%	0.11%
Asian alone (NH)	170	280	269	1.43%	2.35%	2.17%
Native Hawaiian or Pacific Islander alone (NH)	0	6	4	0.00%	0.05%	0.03%
Other race alone (NH)	8	11	70	0.07%	0.09%	0.56%
Mixed race or Multiracial (NH)	106	171	522	0.89%	1.44%	4.21%
Hispanic or Latino (any race)	119	229	327	1.00%	1.92%	2.64%
Total	11,863	11,912	12,404	100.00%	100.00%	100.00%

Historical population
Census	Pop.	Note	%±
1950	1,645		—
1960	11,106		575.1%
1970	15,123		36.2%
1980	12,815		−15.3%
1990	11,234		−12.3%
2000	11,863		5.6%
2010	11,912		0.4%
2020	12,404		4.1%
U.S. Decennial Census

=== 2020 census ===
As of the 2020 census, there were 12,404 people, 5,241 households, and 3,434 families in Crestwood. The population density was 3,455.2 per square mile (1,335.2/km^{2}).

Of the 5,241 households, 29.3% had children under the age of 18 living in them. About 53.0% were married-couple households, 13.8% were households with a male householder and no spouse or partner present, and 28.6% were households with a female householder and no spouse or partner present. About 29.8% of all households were made up of individuals, and 16.9% had someone living alone who was 65 years of age or older. The average household size was 2.5 and the average family size was 2.9.

There were 5,448 housing units at an average density of 1,356.3 per square mile (524.1/km^{2}). Of all housing units, 3.8% were vacant. The homeowner vacancy rate was 0.9% and the rental vacancy rate was 4.7%.

The median age was 42.9 years. 22.2% of residents were under the age of 18 and 21.8% were 65 years of age or older. For every 100 females there were 89.1 males, and for every 100 females age 18 and over there were 86.0 males age 18 and over. 100.0% of residents lived in urban areas, while 0.0% lived in rural areas.

=== Income and poverty ===
The 2016–2020 5-year American Community Survey estimates show that the median household income was $94,161 (with a margin of error of +/- $7,552) and the median family income was $105,759 (+/- $7,958). Males had a median income of $51,647 (+/- $6,949) versus $43,348 (+/- $4,519) for females. The median income for those above 16 years old was $47,955 (+/- $3,717). Approximately, 4.2% of families and 6.7% of the population were below the poverty line, including 7.7% of those under the age of 18 and 3.0% of those ages 65 or over.

=== 2010 census ===
As of the census of 2010, there were 11,912 people, 5,153 households, and 3,348 families living in the city. The population density was 3,308.9 inhabitants per square mile (1,277.6/km^{2}). There were 5,452 housing units at an average density of 1,514.4 per square mile (584.7/km^{2}). The racial makeup of the city was 93.8% White, 1.6% African American, 0.2% Native American, 2.4% Asian, 0.1% Pacific Islander, 0.4% from other races, and 1.7% from two or more races. Hispanic or Latino of any race were 1.9% of the population.

There were 5,153 households, of which 25.4% had children under the age of 18 living with them, 52.6% were married couples living together, 9.3% had a female householder with no husband present, 3.1% had a male householder with no wife present, and 35.0% were non-families. 30.6% of all households were made up of individuals, and 16.5% had someone living alone who was 65 years of age or older. The average household size was 2.29 and the average family size was 2.87.

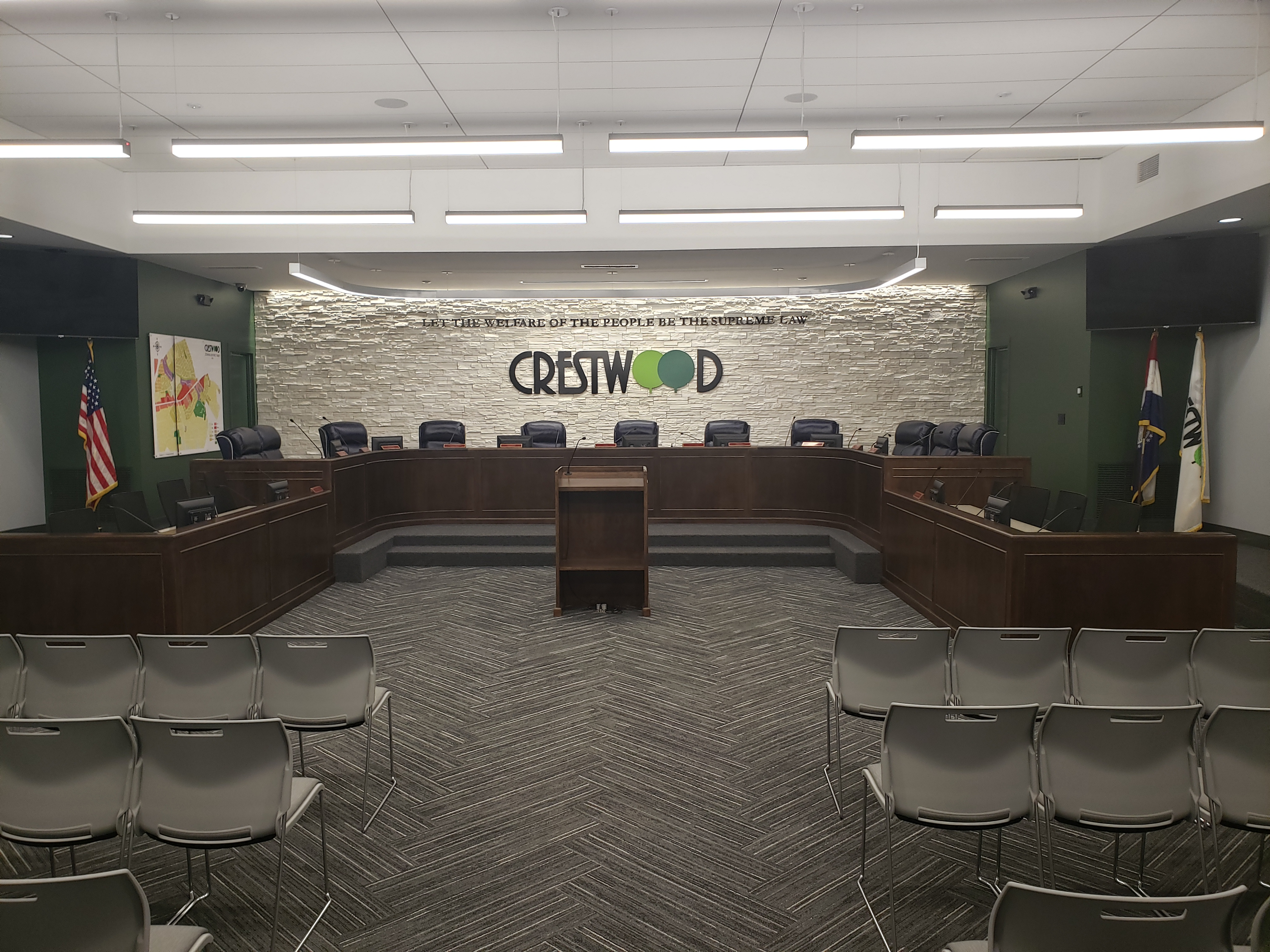
City of Crestwood Board of Aldermen Chambers

The median age in the city was 46 years. 20.5% of residents were under the age of 18; 6.1% were between the ages of 18 and 24; 22% were from 25 to 44; 29.2% were from 45 to 64; and 22.3% were 65 years of age or older. The gender makeup of the city was 47.1% male and 52.9% female.

=== 2000 census ===
As of the census of 2000, there were 11,863 people, 5,111 households, and 3,521 families living in the city. The population density was 3,296.2 inhabitants per square mile (1,272.7/km^{2}). There were 5,214 housing units at an average density of 1,448.7 per square mile (559.3/km^{2}). The racial makeup of the city was 96.41% White, 0.72% African American, 0.19% Native American, 1.45% Asian, 0.01% Pacific Islander, 0.26% from other races, and 0.96% from two or more races. Hispanic or Latino of any race were 1.00% of the population.

There were 5,111 households, out of which 24.0% had children under the age of 18 living with them, 57.8% were married couples living together, 8.7% had a female householder with no husband present, and 31.1% were non-families. 27.5% of all households were made up of individuals, and 14.9% had someone living alone who was 65 years of age or older. The average household size was 2.32 and the average family size was 2.83.

In the city, the population was spread out, with 20.0% under the age of 18, 5.9% from 18 to 24, 24.3% from 25 to 44, 25.0% from 45 to 64, and 24.8% who were 65 years of age or older. The median age was 45 years. For every 100 females, there were 88.8 males. For every 100 females age 18 and over, there were 85.3 males.

The median income for a household in the city was $54,185, and the median income for a family was $64,240. Males had a median income of $46,473 versus $31,934 for females. The per capita income for the city was $26,793. About 1.5% of families and 2.4% of the population were below the poverty line, including 3.8% of those under age 18 and 1.6% of those age 65 or over.

== Governance ==
The City of Crestwood is governed by a mayor and a board of aldermen. The board comprises eight aldermen, two from each of the cities four wards. The Mayor and Aldermen are elected for up to three, three-year terms.

The current mayor is:

Mayor: Scott Shipley (elected in April 2023, re-elected April 2026)

The current aldermen are:

- Ward 1: James Zavist (elected April 2022, re-elected April 2025) and Jesse Morrison (elected April 2021, re-elected April 2024)
- Ward 2; Kitty Nangle Lohrum (appointed June 2026) and Rebecca Now (elected April 2024)
- Ward 3; Greg Hall (elected April 2019, re-elected April 2022 and 2025) and Grant Mabie (elected April 2024)
- Ward 4; Megan Gadallah (elected April 2025) and John Sebben (elected April 2021, re-elected April 2024)

== Education ==
Lindbergh Schools serves almost all of Crestwood, while Affton School District serves a small portion. Their respective high schools are Lindbergh High School, and Affton High School.

Public schools of the Lindbergh District within the Crestwood City limits:

- Crestwood Elementary School
- Long Elementary School
- Truman Middle School (partially in Crestwood, partially in Sunset Hills)

A private school, Holy Cross Academy, is in Crestwood.

== See also ==
- List of cities in Missouri
