= Lindbergh Schools =

School district in St. Louis County, Missouri

Coordinates: 38.537210°N 90.379557°W

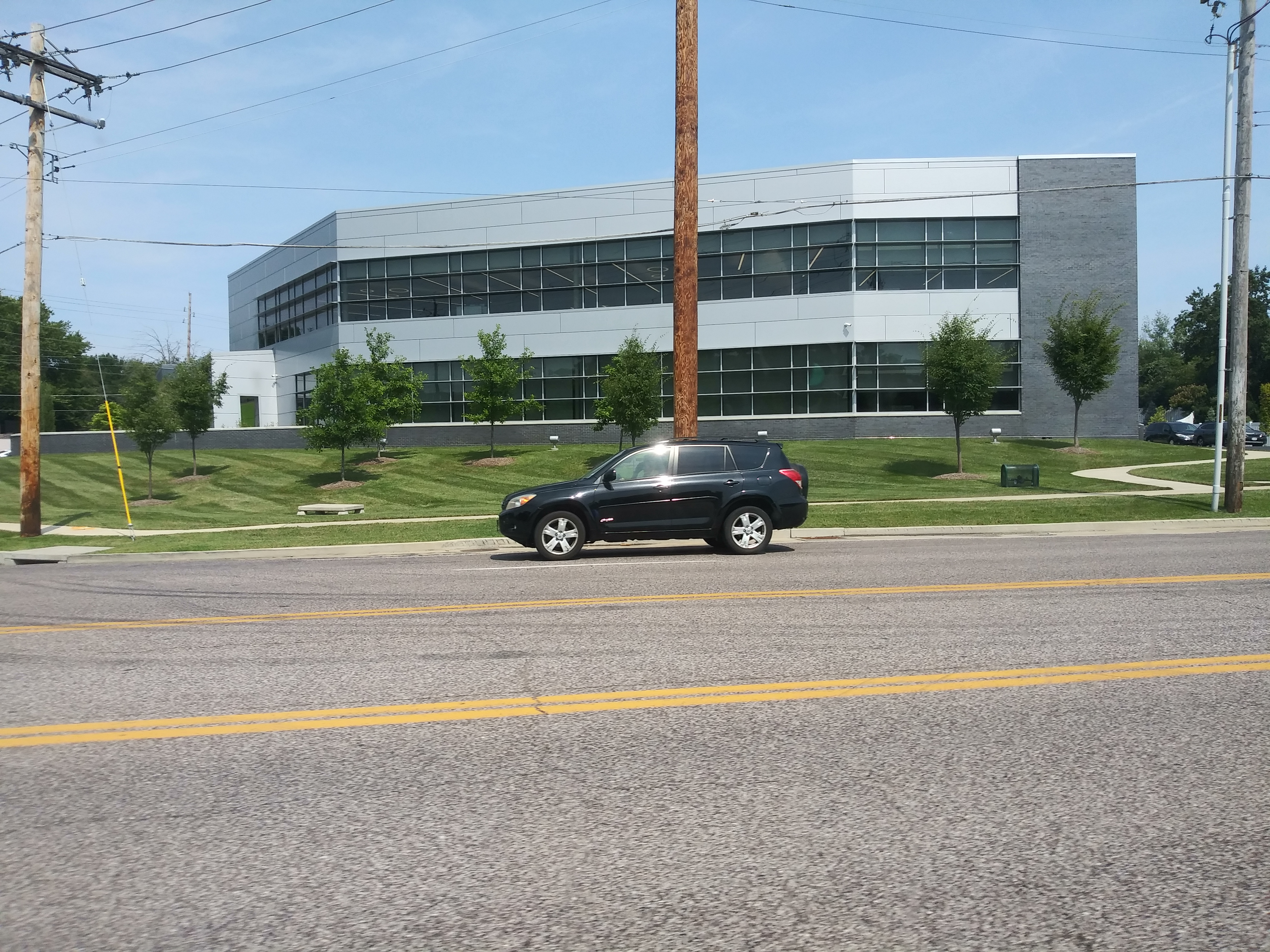
- The Headquarters building of Lindbergh Schools in August 2021

Location
- St. Louis, Missouri St. Louis County United States
- Coordinates: 38.537210, -90.379557

District information
- Type: Local school district
- Grades: K-12
- Superintendent: Dr. Tony Lake
- Schools: 9
- Budget: $79,523,365 (2020-21)
- NCES District ID: 2918690

Students and staff
- Students: 7,087
- Teachers: 507
- Staff: 244.66 (on an FTE basis)
- Student–teacher ratio: 13.98
- Athletic conference: Suburban West Conference
- District mascot: Flyers
- Colors: Green and Gold

Other information
- Website: go.lindberghschools.ws

Lindbergh Schools is a public school district in St. Louis County, Missouri, United States. Lindbergh School District serves 6,877 students as of the 2017-2018 school year. Its new headquarters are located at the former site of Johnny's Market in Sappington, a census-designated place and unincorporated area. Lindbergh Schools is currently facing a large growth rate in student population (2107).

The district has 6 elementary schools, 2 middle schools and 1 high school, and Lindbergh High School, which has a student teacher ratio noticeably higher than the state and national averages. There are 464 staff as of the 2016-2017 school year. The average teacher's salary is $53,561 and $107,664 is the average school principal's salary. Dr. Tony Lake, the superintendent since 2018, earned $227,236 in the 2021-2022 school year.

Lindbergh Schools is located in the southwest portion of St. Louis County and serves students from all or part of nine different localities: Crestwood, Concord Village, Fenton, Grantwood Village, Green Park, Kirkwood, Lakeshire, Sappington and Sunset Hills.

== Schools ==
=== High schools ===
- Lindbergh High School (Sappington) has a current enrollment of 2075 students, and a graduation rate of 96%. As this is the only high school, students from all localities served by the district attend this school. 113 teachers teach at this school.

=== Middle schools ===
- Robert H. Sperreng Middle School (Sappington) has an enrollment of 777 as of the 2016-2017 school year. It's feeder schools are Dressel Elementary, Concord Elementary, and Kennerly Elementary. Sperreng also has 41 teachers, but their average experience is 13 years. Sperreng is noted for its few windows. There was also a bomb threat that led to students being evacuated in May 2018.
- Truman Middle School (in Crestwood and Sunset Hills) has an enrollment of 777 as of the 2016-2017 school year. Its feeder schools are Sappington Elementary, Long Elementary, and Crestwood Elementary. Truman has 41 teachers, who have an average experience of 11 years teaching. Truman was an elementary school before being converted to a middle school, and a junior high school originally.

=== Elementary schools ===
- Concord Elementary School (Sappington). 557 students currently learn here
- Crestwood Elementary School (Crestwood) Has an ELL (English Language Learners) program
- Dressel Elementary School (Concord) - opened in fall 2017, built on the site of the previous Dresel School, which served many purposes including housing the Lindbergh Eager Achievers Program(LEAP) until a year before its demolition. LEAP students were taught at Sperreng, until the 2023-2024 school year when they moved to the Idea Center, located at Lindbergh High School.
- Kennerly Elementary School (Sappington)
- Long Elementary School (Crestwood). Only Lindbergh school with 3 or less stars from both Great Schools and Niche; this is from parent ratings as well as statistical surveys. Long is also noted to have issues with bullying.
- Sappington Elementary School (Sappington). In the 2016-2017 school year 5th grade students were sent to Sperreng due to overcrowding.

=== Preschools ===
- Early Childhood Education (ECE) Center (Sappington)
  - From 1984 until 2006 it known as "Affton-Lindbergh Early Childhood Education" when this district cooperated with the Affton School District in having a joint program. Affton asked for a joint program with Lindbergh since its original preschool location had no more room to expand, while Truman Middle was not in use at the time. The program moved to the Concord school building in 1996, remaining there when Lindbergh's preschool separated. it is now located next to Lindbergh High School.
- ECE West (Sunset Hills) - adjacent to Truman Middle School, it began housing half-day preschool classes in August 2015
