= Gravois =

Gravois may refer to:

- Gravois Township, St. Louis County, Missouri, United States
- Gravois Creek, Morgan County, Missouri
- Gravois Road or Avenue, the section of Missouri Route 30 in St. Louis, Missouri
- Rivière de Gravois, French former name of Sixteen Mile Creek (Halton Region), Ontario, Canada
- Gravois Aluminum Boats, original name of Metal Shark Boats, an American developer and builder of aluminum-hull vessels in Louisiana

== See also ==
- Gravois Park, St. Louis, a city neighborhood
