= Rico Payton =

American football player (born 1999)

Profile
- Position: Cornerback

Personal information
- Born: November 28, 1999 (age 26); St. Louis, Missouri, U.S.
- Listed height: 6 ft 0 in (1.83 m)
- Listed weight: 182 lb (83 kg)

Career information
- High school: Lindbergh (Sappington, Missouri)
- College: Southern Illinois (2018); Pittsburg State (2019–2023)
- NFL draft: 2024: undrafted

Career history
- New Orleans Saints (2024); New York Giants (2025)

Career NFL statistics as of 2025
- Total tackles: 23
- Pass deflections: 2
- Stats at Pro Football Reference

Rico Payton III (born November 28, 1999) is an American professional football cornerback. He played college football for the Southern Illinois Salukis and Pittsburg State Gorillas.

== Early life ==
Payton was born on November 28, 1999, and grew up in St. Louis, Missouri. He attended Lindbergh High School in Sappington, Missouri, where he played football as a wide receiver and cornerback. As a senior in 2017, he helped Lindbergh reach the district championship while being chosen first-team all-state at defensive back and second-team all-state at return specialist. He caught 41 passes for 845 yards and 10 touchdowns, ran for 836 yards and 17 touchdowns, and totaled 30 tackles with three interceptions. He committed to play college football for the Southern Illinois Salukis.

== College career ==
Payton redshirted as a freshman at Southern Illinois in 2018, then transferred to the NCAA Division II Pittsburg State Gorillas in 2019. In his first year with the Gorillas, Payton played in all 11 games, two as a starter, and recorded 14 tackles, 1.5 tackles-for-loss (TFLs) and four pass breakups. He did not play in the 2020 season, opting out due to the COVID-19 pandemic. He made 12 tackles, six pass breakups and an interception while starting two of nine games played in 2021, and in the 2022 season, started eight of 13 games while totaling 14 tackles, four pass breakups and a fumble recovery. He was a second-team All-Mid-America Intercollegiate Athletics Association (MIAA) for the 2022 season.

In his final year, 2023, Payton played 13 games and made 35 tackles, five TFLs, 16 pass breakups and four interceptions. He was named first-team All-MIAA and served as the team captain. He was named second-team Division II All-American by the American Football Coaches Association (AFCA) and was a nominee for the Division II Cliff Harris Award, for the small college defensive player of the year. He ended his collegiate career having appeared in 35 games, finishing with 64 tackles (46 solo), 26 passes defended and five interceptions.

== Professional career ==
Pre-draft measurables
Height	Weight	Arm length	Hand span	Wingspan	40-yard dash	10-yard split	20-yard split	20-yard shuttle	Three-cone drill	Vertical jump	Broad jump
5 ft 11 1/8 in (1.81 m)	188 lb (85 kg)	31 1/8 in (0.79 m)	8 7/8 in (0.23 m)	6 ft 4 1/8 in (1.93 m)	4.57 s	1.57 s	2.58 s	4.14 s	6.92 s	37.0 in (0.94 m)	10 ft 7 in (3.23 m)
All values from Pro Day

=== New Orleans Saints ===
After going unselected in the 2024 NFL draft, Payton was signed by the New Orleans Saints as an undrafted free agent. After impressing in training camp and preseason, he made the team's 53-man roster for the 2024 season.

On August 26, 2025, Payton was waived by the Saints with an injury designation as part of final roster cuts.

=== New York Giants ===
On August 27, 2025, Payton was claimed off waivers by the New York Giants, but was placed on injured reserve two days later. He was activated on November 1, ahead of the team's Week 9 matchup against the San Francisco 49ers.

On July 7, 2026, Payton was waived by the Giants with an injury designation.
