= Grantwood =

Grantwood may refer to:

- Grantwood Village, Missouri
- Grantwood, New Jersey
