= Affton High School =

Public high school in Missouri, United States

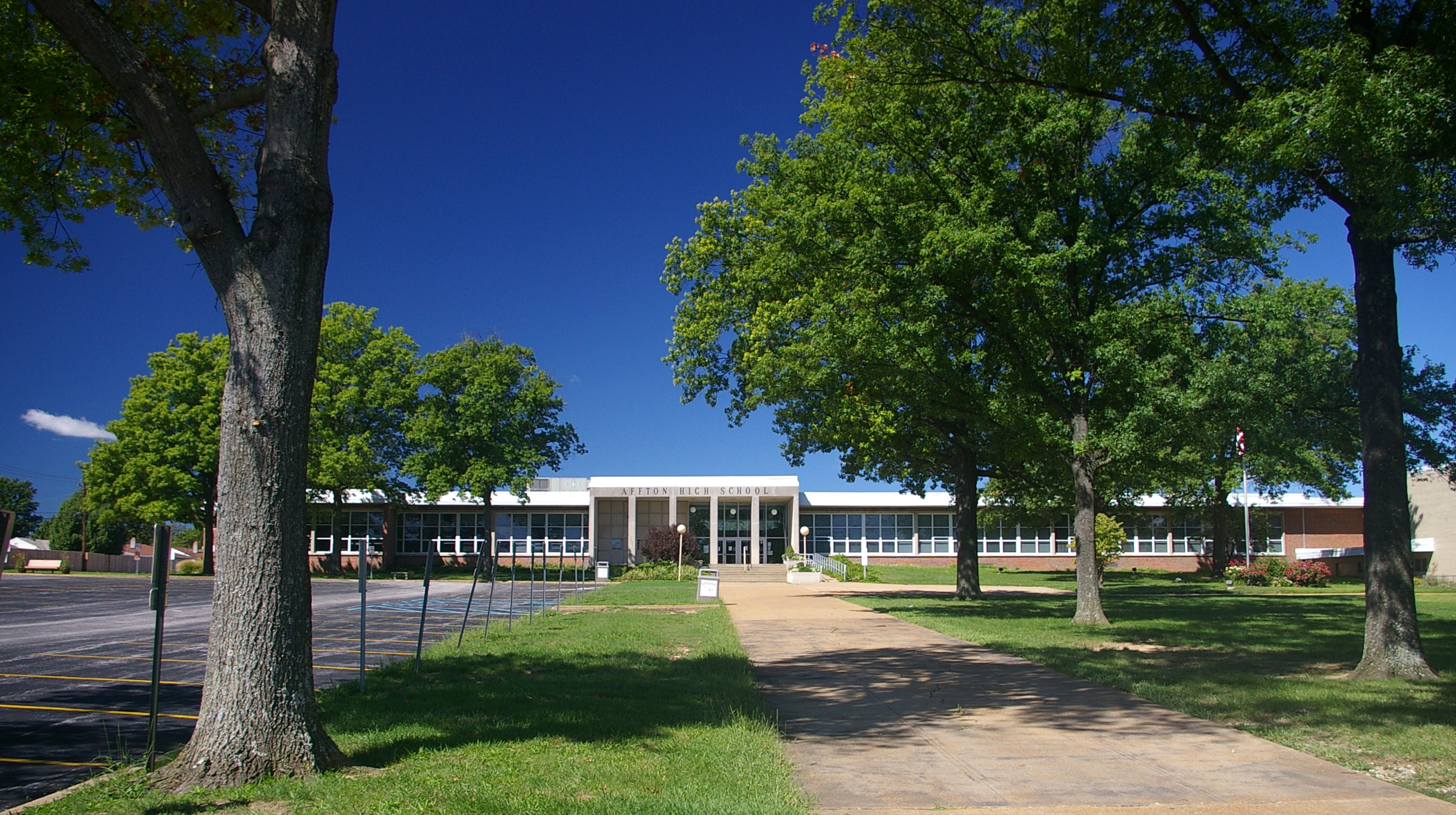
- Front of the Affton High School

Location
- 8309 Mackenzie Road; Affton, Missouri; United States; 38.5594°N 90.3235°W

Information
- Type: Comprehensive high school
- Motto: "Finish Strong"
- Established: 1930; 96 years ago
- School district: Affton School District
- Superintendent: Travis Bracht
- NCES School ID: 290291000009
- Principal: George Calhoun
- Teaching staff: 50.40 (on an FTE basis)
- Grades: 9–12
- Enrollment: 739 (2023–24)
- Student to teacher ratio: 14.66
- Colors: Purple and gold
- Athletics conference: Suburban Conference
- Nickname: Cougars
- Rival: Bayless Senior High School
- Newspaper: The Cougars Tale
- Website: ahs.afftonschools.net

Affton High School is a public comprehensive high school in Affton, St. Louis County, Missouri that is part of the Affton School District.

== History ==
- Affton High School
- U.S. National Register of Historic Places
- Location: 8520 Mackenzie Rd.
- Coordinates: 38.5573°N 90.3218°W
- Built: 1937, 1955
- Architects: George Ingham Barnett (late 1800s?), Bonsack & Pearce (1955)
- Architectural style: Tudor Revival
- NRHP reference No.: 10000551
- Added to NRHP: August 12, 2010

The first high school classes in Affton were offered in 1930 at 8701 Mackenzie Road in the basement of the former McKenzie School, in a building that now serves as the district administrative office building. The first section of the original building, which was later named W.F. Gaunt High School, was constructed in 1936 at 8520 Mackenzie Road, and 1937 marked the first class to graduate from the new high school. The building is currently the Sanders Work Activity Center. Gaunt was a principal at the school.

The current high school building was built on a 22-acre (89,000 m^{2}) plot in 1955. A classroom and cafeteria addition was added in 1958. Ninth grade students were temporarily moved to Mackenzie School in the fall of 1958, back to the Senior High in 1959, and into a new ninth grade center at Gaunt School, after an addition was finished in 1961. The terra cotta cougar and bronze school seal, located in the lobby, were donated by the Classes of 1961 and 1962, respectively. An addition was added in 1963, and in 1965 a bond issue was passed to provide the high school with an auditorium, pool, library and additional classrooms. The "pod" area of the high school was added in 1969. Ninth grade students were moved back to the high school after the Gaunt school was closed in 1978.

Prior to the start of the 2002–2003 school year, new science labs were added to the science classrooms. In addition, business computer labs, FACS classrooms, Science classrooms and administrative offices were upgraded. This work was made possible by the passing of Proposition A in 2000. A new student commons addition was built on to the existing cafeterias and opened for the 2004–2005 school year. The commons was made possible by a million-dollar donation from Affton High School alumni Bill ('63) and Nancy ('65) Thompson. A new athletic complex, which included a new football field, bleachers, all-weather track and lights made its debut at the start of the 2004–2005 school year, with contributions from actor and alumnus John Goodman.

Scenes from the 2009 film Up in the Air were shot at Affton High School.

On August 12, 2010, the original high school building was added to the National Register of Historic Places.

About 20 percent of the school is of Bosnian descent.

== Activities ==
For the 2013–2014 school year, the school offered 18 activities approved by the Missouri State High School Activities Association (MSHSAA): baseball, boys' and girls' basketball, sideline cheerleading, dance team, 11-man football, boys' golf, music activities, boys' and girls' soccer, softball, boys' and girls' swimming and diving, boys' and girls' track and field, boys' and girls' volleyball, and wrestling. In addition to its current activities, Affton students have won several state championships, including:

- Girls' basketball: 1985
- Ice Hockey: 1974-1975 State Champions
- Ice Hockey: 1999-2000 Wickenheiser Memorial Cup Champions

The school also has had two state individual champions in boys' swimming and diving.

Towards the end of the 2018–2019 school year the school began an Esports team with 5 students. The following year the team expanded past 30 students and the district purchased 10 gaming computers. Towards the end of the 2019-2020 students would not return from their Spring Break following March 12, 2020 due to the COVID-19 pandemic this resulted in the school encouraging participation in the Esports team to retain student engagement in activities. At the start of the 2020–2021 school year with students remotely learning the district hired a full-time coach for the team.

== Notable alumni ==
- Derek Blasberg: fashion writer
- Markus Golden: NFL linebacker
- John Goodman: actor
- Tishaura Jones: St. Louis City mayor
- Bruce Rittmann: professor
- Kristeen Young: musician
- Elvir Kafedžić: Soccer coach
