= Grant's Farm =

Historic farm and landmark in Grantwood Village, Missouri, United States of America

- Interactive map of Grant's Farm
- 38°32′53″N 90°21′27″W
- Date opened: 1954
- Location: Grantwood Village, MO
- Website: www.grantsfarm.com

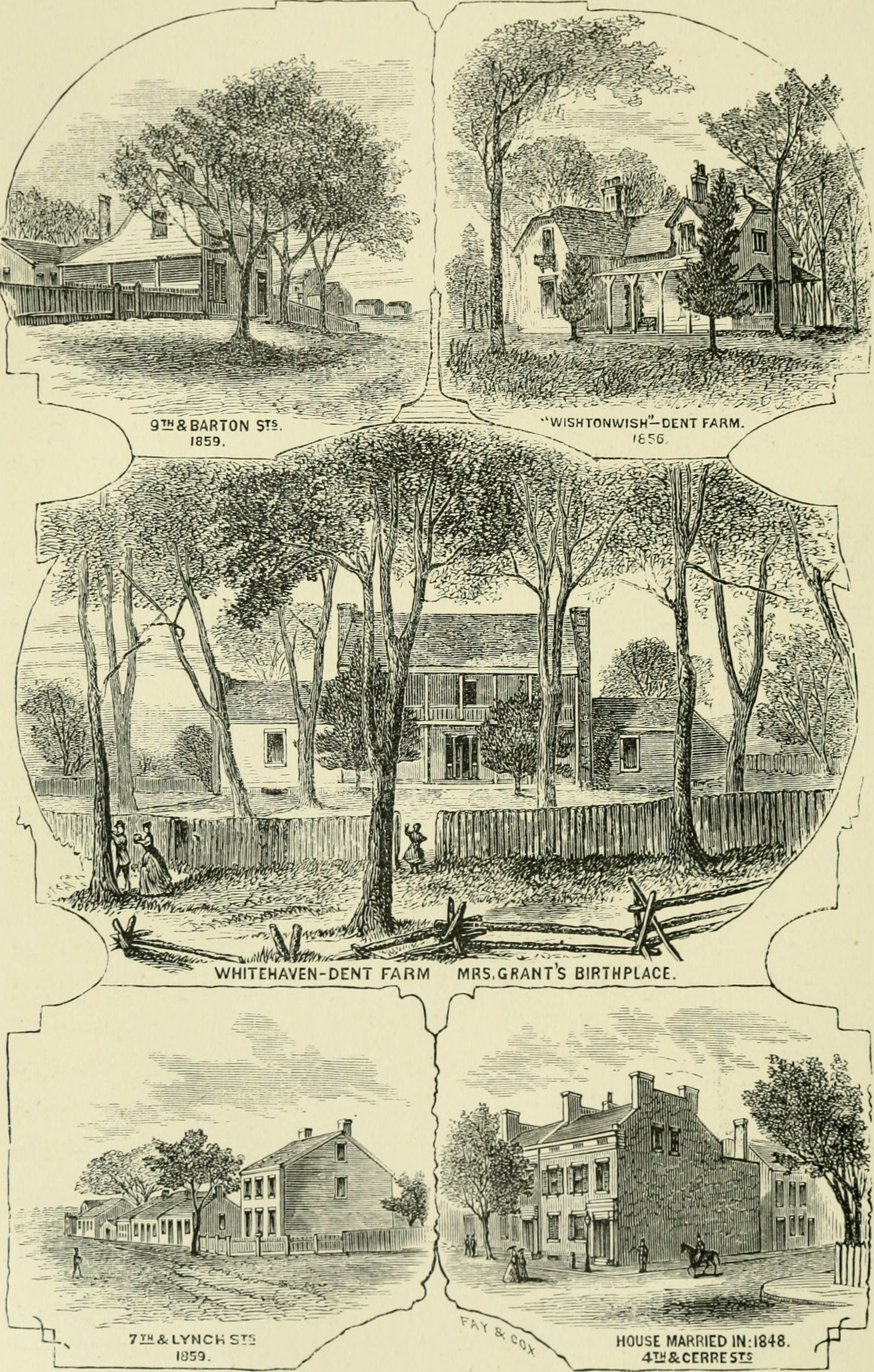
A personal history of Ulysses S. Grant, and sketch of Schuyler Colfax (1868)

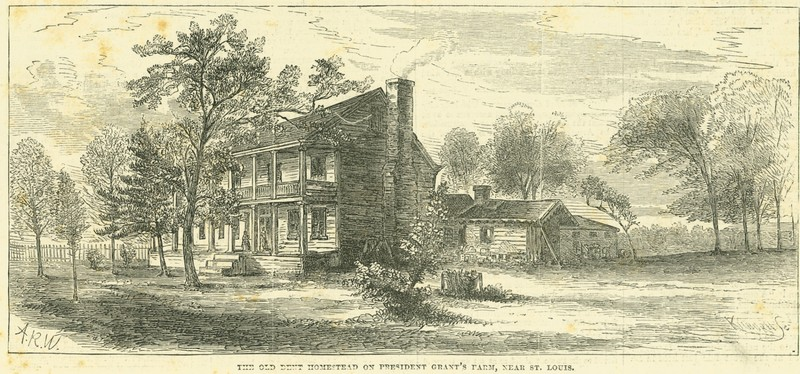
Horizontal wood engraving on a vertical page from Every Saturday, November 25, 1871, page 525, showing an old two-story house surrounded by trees.

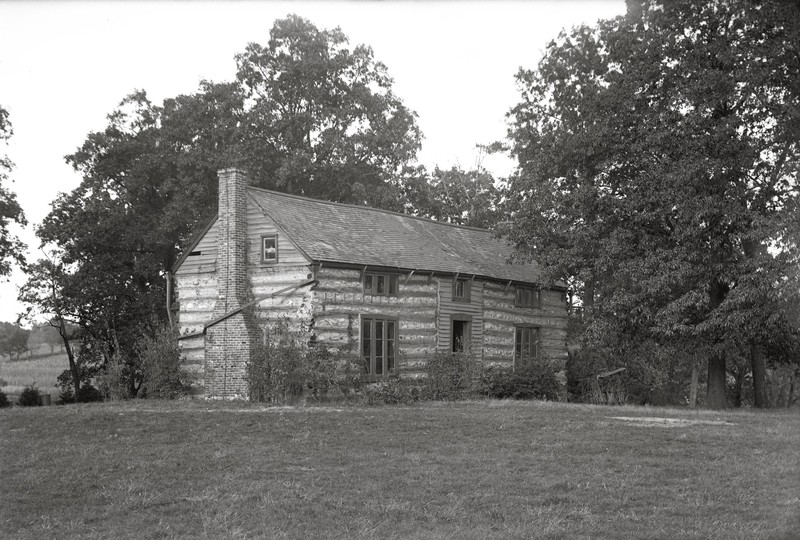
Horizontal, black and white photograph of three-quarter view of Grant's log cabin and surrounding grounds in 1912

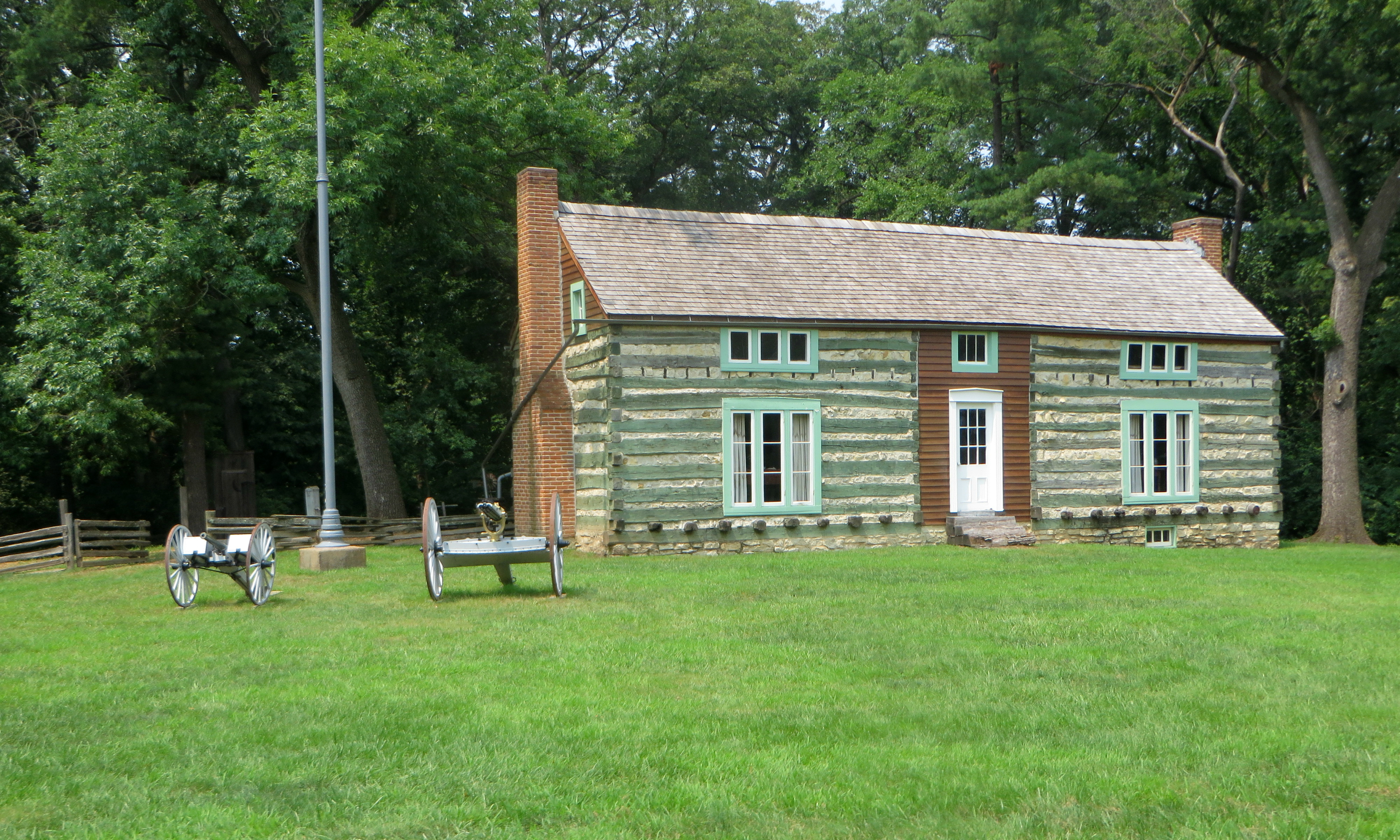
Grant's log cabin in 2015

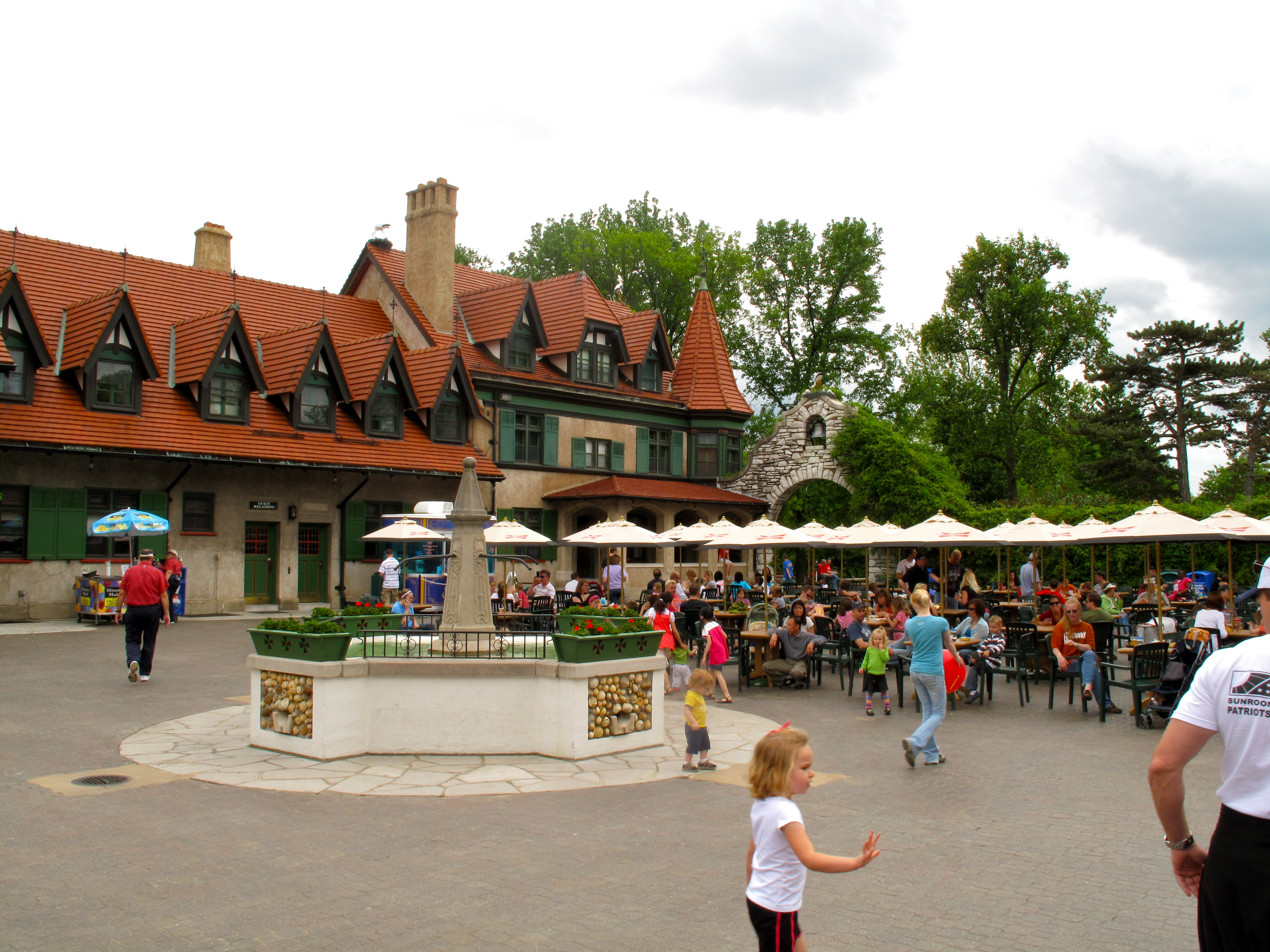
The Bauernhof Beer Garden at Grant's Farm, 2010

Grant's Farm is a historic farm, and long-standing landmark in Grantwood Village, Missouri, built by Ulysses S. Grant on land given to him and his wife by his father in law Frederick Fayette Dent shortly after they became married in 1848. It has also served as a residence of various members of the Busch family.

== Description and history ==
The property was at one time owned by Ulysses S. Grant and prior to that, by the Dent family. Since 1903 it has been owned by the Busch family, who previously owned the Anheuser-Busch Brewing Company until it was sold to InBev in 2008. Originally a private deer park for the Busch Family, Grant's Farm has been an animal reserve since 1954. It is open to the public for free; however, there is a parking fee of $18 per vehicle. This fee helps to maintain the farm and care for the animals. The farm is home to such animals as buffalo, emus, camels, macaws, donkeys, goats, peacocks, the iconic Budweiser Clydesdales among others. Most of these animals can be seen by visitors on a tram tour of the deer park region of the park, while the Clydesdales are found in their nearby barn and pastures. The farm also contains a cabin called "Hardscrabble," which was built by Ulysses S. Grant in 1856 on another part of the property and later relocated to Grant's Farm after being shown at the 1904 World's Fair. It is the only remaining structure that was hand-built by a U.S. president prior to assuming office.

Also on the farm is the Busch family mansion known as the "Big House", and a house in which Ulysses S. Grant resided between the Mexican and Civil Wars called White Haven. This had been his wife, Julia Grant's, family home. Colonel Frederick Dent, Julia's father, gave 80 acres of the farm to the couple as a wedding present on what today is Rock Hill Road. Grant built his cabin on this land. Colonel Dent was a plantation owner in St. Louis County. He owned 925 acres along Gravois Creek, 10 miles southwest of the city, and owned slaves to farm the land. Five miles from the Dent farm was Jefferson Barracks, where Ulysses S. Grant was assigned in 1843, after attending West Point and rooming with Julia Dent's brother. Grant's cabin was featured at the 1904 World's Fair. White Haven, next door to Grant's Farm, the Busch family estate, is now a national historic site: the Ulysses S. Grant National Historic Site.

== Ownership and potential sale of Grant's Farm ==
In November 2015, the Saint Louis Zoo agreed to purchase Grant's Farm from six heirs of the beer baron, August A. "Gussie" Busch, Jr. for approximately $30 million. The deal required a city judge to back four of the Busch heirs in order to release the land from a trust. Area residents would also have to approve $8.5 million in added taxes to support yearly park operational costs. The deal would triple the land holdings of the zoo and allow the zoo to build a breeding facility for its endangered animals. The Busch family would remain owners of the family mansion for the time being. A-B InBev had leased the land from the Busch family and had operated Grant's Farm since it bought Anheuser-Busch in 2008. A-B InBev agreed to donate approximately $27 million to the zoo to buy the farm. One Busch heir, Billy Busch, made a competing offer as he wanted to keep the farm in the family. Billy Busch owned William K. Busch Brewing Co. and wanted to expand his brewery on the land. In March 2016, the Saint Louis Zoo Association withdrew its offer to buy Grant's Farm, citing the family's disagreement as one of the primary reasons. In April 2016, the family dispute continued as Billy Busch outbid his siblings' offer by $1, with a bid of $26,000,001 along with $8 million to purchase the family mansion. In December 2017, five family members (Andrew Busch, Peter Busch, Robert Hermann Jr, Trudy Valentine, and Beatrice von Gontard) agreed to purchase the farm, with the aim of keeping it free and open to the public.

== See also ==
- Bibliography of Ulysses S. Grant
- Ulysses S. Grant National Historic Site
- List of residences of presidents of the United States
