= Markus Golden =

American football player (born 1991)

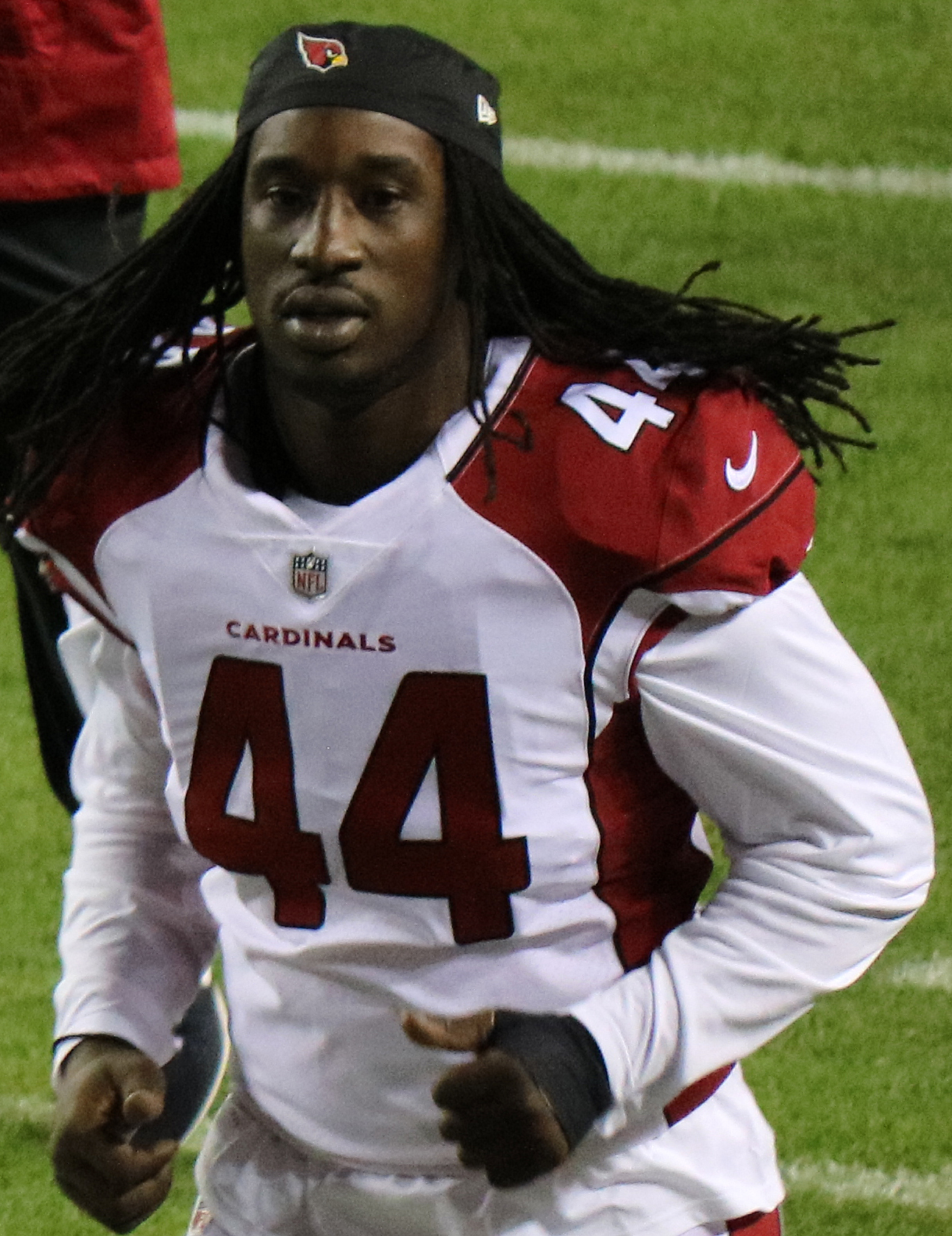
- Golden in the 2017 NFL preseason

No. 44
- Position: Linebacker

Personal information
- Born: March 13, 1991 (age 35); St. Louis, Missouri, U.S.
- Listed height: 6 ft 2 in (1.88 m)
- Listed weight: 260 lb (118 kg)

Career information
- High school: Affton (Affton, Missouri)
- College: Hutchinson CC (2011); Missouri (2012–2014)
- NFL draft: 2015: 2nd round, 58th overall pick

Career history
- Arizona Cardinals (2015–2018); New York Giants (2019–2020); Arizona Cardinals (2020–2022); Pittsburgh Steelers (2023)

Awards and highlights
- Second-team All-SEC (2014); Citrus Bowl MVP (2015)

Career NFL statistics
- Total tackles: 343
- Sacks: 51.0
- Forced fumbles: 11
- Fumble recoveries: 5
- Pass deflections: 8
- Interceptions: 1
- Defensive touchdowns: 1
- Stats at Pro Football Reference

Markus Golden (born March 13, 1991) is an American former professional football player who was a linebacker in the National Football League (NFL). He played college football for the Missouri Tigers and was selected by the Arizona Cardinals in the second round of the 2015 NFL draft. Golden has also played for the New York Giants and Pittsburgh Steelers.

== Early life ==
Golden was a record-setting running back and linebacker at Affton High School. His junior season saw him record a school-record 168 tackles and 16 sacks, while he also ran for 1,139 yards and 16 touchdowns. As a senior, he ran for a record 2,264 yards and 30 touchdowns while also making 108 tackles and 10 sacks.

== College career ==
=== Hutchinson Community College ===
As a freshman at Hutchinson, Golden made 90 tackles, including 26 tackles for loss and 10 sacks, to go with five forced fumbles and a pair of interceptions. Hutchinson lost to Butler Community College in the regular season and the KJCCC championship. The 2011 Butler team was led by Dallas Cowboys defensive end DeMarcus Lawrence.

=== University of Missouri ===
Despite joining Missouri's team late due to clearinghouse issues, Golden was still able to provide a nice impact, playing in all 12 games (primarily on special teams) and made 10 tackles while forcing one fumble in all. He was also a major performer on various special teams units.

As a junior in 2013, Golden played about 40% of the snaps behind Kony Ealy and Michael Sam and led MU ends with 55 tackles on the year, and added 13 tackles for loss and 6.5 sacks with 8 passes broken up.

Golden entered his senior season as one of the premier pass rushers in the nation. He lived up to the hype, recording 21 tackles and 4 sacks in the first three games before a hamstring injury slowed him down and also kept him out of the game vs. Indiana. Despite this, he still finished the season with 78 tackles and 10 sacks on the season. He and teammate Shane Ray became the first Missouri teammates to both record double digit sacks in the same season.

== Professional career ==
=== Pre-draft ===
On December 24, 2014, it was announced that Golden had accepted his invitation to play in the 2015 Senior Bowl. Throughout Senior Bowl practices, he impressed scouts and team representatives with his ability to get to the quarterback. On January 24, 2015, Golden played in the Reese's Senior Bowl and made one tackle for a four-yard loss as he played for Jacksonville Jaguars head coach Gus Bradley's South team that lost 34–13 to the North. He was one of 54 defensive linemen to attend the NFL Scouting Combine in Indianapolis, Indiana. Golden ran the 40-yard dash, 20-yard dash, and 10-yard dash before suffering a hamstring injury that kept him from completing the rest of the combine drills. A previous hand injury also made him unable to do the bench press and he finished 19th among his position group in the 40-yard dash. On March 19, 2015, Golden opted to attend Missouri's pro day, along with Shane Ray, Marcus Murphy, Bud Sasser, Mitch Morse, and nine other prospects. He performed all of the combine drills and bested his times in the 40-yard dash (4.77s), 20-yard dash (2.77s), and 10-yard dash (1.71s) from the combine. Team representatives and scouts from 30 NFL teams attended, including Pittsburgh Steelers head coach Mike Tomlin and assistant coaches from Baltimore Ravens and the New England Patriots. At the conclusion of the pre-draft process, Golden was projected by NFL draft experts and scouts to be a third to fifth round pick. He was ranked the ninth best defensive end prospect by NFL analyst Charles Davis, was ranked the 12th best defensive end by NFL analyst Mike Mayock, and was ranked the 14th best outside linebacker in the draft by DraftScout.com.

Pre-draft measurables
Height	Weight	Arm length	Hand span	40-yard dash	10-yard split	20-yard split	20-yard shuttle	Three-cone drill	Vertical jump	Broad jump	Bench press
6 ft 2 3/8 in (1.89 m)	260 lb (118 kg)	31 1/8 in (0.79 m)	10 1/2 in (0.27 m)	4.90 s	1.68 s	2.81 s	4.59 s	7.39 s	28 1/2 in (0.72 m)	9 ft 2 in (2.79 m)	17 reps
All values from NFL Combine

=== Arizona Cardinals (first stint) ===
==== 2015 ====
The Arizona Cardinals selected Golden in the second round (58th overall) of the 2015 NFL draft. The Cardinals originally owned the No. 55 overall pick and had long-planned to draft Nebraska running back Ameer Abdullah, but he was selected by the Detroit Lions the pick prior (54th overall). They decided to trade their second round pick (55th overall) to the Ravens in exchange for the Ravens' second round pick (58th overall) and a fifth round pick (158th overall). The Ravens selected Minnesota tight end Maxx Williams and the Cardinals opted to select David Johnson in the third round (86th overall). He was the sixth outside linebacker and the first of two outside linebackers selected by the Cardinals, before Shaquille Riddick (158th overall).

On May 14, 2015, the Cardinals signed Golden to a four-year, $3.91 million contract that includes $1.72 million guaranteed and a signing bonus of $1.10 million.

Throughout training camp, Golden competed against Alex Okafor, Lorenzo Alexander, LaMarr Woodley, Shaquille Riddick, and Alani Fua for a job as the starting outside linebacker. Head coach Bruce Arians named Golden the backup strongside linebacker behind LaMarr Woodley to begin the regular season.

He made his professional regular season debut in the Cardinals' season-opener against the New Orleans Saints and recorded three combined tackles during their 31–19 victory. He made his first career tackle on Khiry Robinson after he ran for a three-yard gain in the third quarter. The following week, he had one assisted tackle and had his first career sack during a 48–23 victory at the Chicago Bears. He made his first career sack with Kareem Martin as they both brought down Chicago Bears' quarterback Jimmy Clausen for a ten-yard loss in the closing minutes of the fourth quarter. On October 18, 2015, Golden made his first career start and recorded a season-high six combined tackles during a 25–13 loss at the Steelers. He started the next three games after starting weakside linebacker Alex Okafor suffered a calf injury and was ruled inactive. In Week 11, Golden collected three solo tackles and made his first career solo sack on Cincinnati Bengals quarterback Andy Dalton in their 34–31 victory. Golden missed the Cardinals' Week 17 loss to the Seattle Seahawks after suffering a knee injury. He finished his rookie season with 31 combined tackles (21 solo) and four sacks in 15 games and six starts.

The Cardinals finished the 2015 season atop the National Football Conference (NFC) West with a 13–3 record and received a playoff berth. On January 16, 2016, Golden received started his first career playoff game after Alex Okafor suffered a toe injury that managed to sideline him for the entire playoffs. He made three combined tackles during their 26–20 overtime victory over the Green Bay Packers in the NFC Divisional round. The following game, he made seven combined tackles as the Cardinals were routed 49–15 in the NFC Championship to the Carolina Panthers. He finished his rookie season with 31 combined tackles (21 solo), four sacks, and two forced fumbles in 15 games and six starts.

==== 2016 ====
Golden entered training camp competing with Alex Okafor for the role as the starting outside linebacker. He was named the starting weakside linebacker to begin the regular season, opposite newly acquired teammate Chandler Jones.

He started the Cardinals' season-opener against the Patriots and made two solo tackles and sacked Jimmy Garoppolo in their 23–21 loss. In Week 3, he made his first official start of the season and collected six combined tackles and 1 sack on Buffalo Bills quarterback Tyrod Taylor during a 33–18 loss. On October 6, 2016, Golden recorded a career-high ten combined tackles (seven solo) and made two sacks on Blaine Gabbert as the Cardinals defeated the San Francisco 49ers 33–21. It marked Golden's first career multi-sack game. In week 16 against the Seattle Seahawks, he sacked Russell Wilson twice in the 34–31 victory. On January 1, 2017, he made four combined tackles, deflected a pass, and a season-high 2.5 sacks on Jared Goff, as the Cardinals routed the Los Angeles Rams 44–6. Golden finished the season with 51 combined tackles, 12.5 sacks, four forced fumbles, and a pass deflection in 16 games and three starts.

He led the Cardinals with 12.5 sacks and finished third in the entire league. Golden and Chandler Jones became the first Arizona Cardinals duo to both finish with a double-digit sack total since 1984. Chandler Jones had 11 sacks and they combined for 22.5 total sacks. The Cardinals did not receive a playoff berth after finishing with a 7–8–1 record and ended their season second in the NFC West in 2016.

==== 2017 ====
Golden entered 2017 slated as the starting weakside linebacker after having a stellar season in 2016. On September 17, 2017, Golden recorded a season-high four combined tackles in a 16–13 victory at the Indianapolis Colts. On October 1, 2017, Golden collected three solo tackles before leaving the game due to injury as the Cardinals defeated the 49ers 18–15. The following day, it was discovered Golden had suffered a torn ACL and was ruled out for the season. He finished the season with 11 solo tackles in four games and four starts. The Cardinals finished third in the NFC West with an 8–8 record.

==== 2018 ====
In 2018, Golden started 11 games, recording 30 tackles and 2.5 sacks.

=== New York Giants ===
On March 14, 2019, Golden signed a one-year deal worth $3,750,000 contract with the New York Giants. In week 3 against the Tampa Bay Buccaneers, Golden recorded 2 sacks on Jameis Winston in the 32-31 win. In week 6 against the Patriots, Golden recovered a fumble forced by teammate Lorenzo Carter on Tom Brady and returned the ball for a 42 yard touchdown in the 35–14 loss. He finished the year with 10.0 sacks, the most by any Giants linebacker since Lawrence Taylor in 1990.

On April 27, 2020, the Giants placed the unrestricted free agent tender on Golden, meaning if he remained unsigned by July 22, he could only sign with the Giants for the 2020 season. If he signed with another team, the Giants would have received a compensatory draft pick. On July 22, 2020, Golden's exclusive signing rights reverted to the Giants. He signed the one-year tender on August 4, 2020. In Week 7 against the Philadelphia Eagles on Thursday Night Football on October 22, 2020, Golden recorded his first sack of the season on Carson Wentz during the 22–21 loss.

=== Arizona Cardinals (second stint) ===
On October 23, 2020, Golden returned to the Cardinals after he was traded by the Giants for a 2021 sixth-round draft pick.

Golden made his debut with the Cardinals in Week 9 against the Miami Dolphins. During the game, Golden recorded a sack on Tua Tagovailoa during the 34–31 loss. In Week 12 against the Patriots, Golden recorded his first career interception off a pass thrown by Cam Newton during the 20–17 loss. In Week 14 against his former team, the Giants, Golden recorded a strip sack on Daniel Jones that he also recovered during the 26–7 victory.

On March 15, 2021, Golden signed a two-year extension with the Cardinals. He entered the season as a starting pass rusher alongside Chandler Jones. He played in 16 games with five starts, recording 48 tackles, four forced fumbles, and led the team with 11.0 sacks.

On September 9, 2022, Golden signed a one-year contract extension with the Cardinals. He was released on March 10, 2023.

=== Pittsburgh Steelers ===
On May 24, 2023, Golden signed with the Steelers.

Golden signed a one-year contract with the Steelers on August 1, 2024, but announced his retirement a week later.

== NFL career statistics ==
Legend
**Bold**	Career high

=== Regular season ===
Year	Team	Games		Tackles					Interceptions					Fumbles			
Year	Team	GP	GS	Cmb	Solo	Ast	Sck	TFL	Int	Yds	TD	Lng	PD	FF	FR	Yds	TD
2015	ARI	15	6	30	20	10	4.0	4	0	0	0	0	0	2	0	0	0
2016	ARI	16	3	51	**41**	10	**12.5**	**16**	0	0	0	0	1	**4**	0	0	0
2017	ARI	4	4	11	11	0	0.0	1	0	0	0	0	0	0	0	0	0
2018	ARI	11	11	30	25	5	2.5	5	0	0	0	0	**2**	0	0	0	0
2019	NYG	16	16	**72**	37	**35**	10.0	13	0	0	0	0	0	0	1	**42**	**1**
2020	NYG	7	1	10	4	6	1.5	2	0	0	0	0	1	0	0	0	0
2020	ARI	9	8	23	13	10	3.0	4	**1**	**1**	0	**1**	**2**	1	1	30	0
2021	ARI	16	5	48	33	15	11.0	10	0	0	0	0	1	**4**	**2**	0	0
2022	ARI	17	14	48	22	26	2.5	7	0	0	0	0	0	0	0	0	0
2023	PIT	16	0	20	14	6	4.0	6	0	0	0	0	1	0	1	0	0
		127	68	343	220	123	51.0	68	1	1	0	1	8	11	5	72	1

=== Playoffs ===
Year	Team	Games		Tackles					Interceptions					Fumbles			
Year	Team	GP	GS	Cmb	Solo	Ast	Sck	TFL	Int	Yds	TD	Lng	PD	FF	FR	Yds	TD
2015	ARI	2	2	**10**	**4**	**6**	0.0	**1**	0	0	0	0	0	0	0	0	0
2021	ARI	1	0	3	2	1	**1.0**	**1**	0	0	0	0	0	0	0	0	0
2023	PIT	1	1	3	2	1	**1.0**	**1**	0	0	0	0	0	0	0	0	0
		4	3	16	8	8	2.0	3	0	0	0	0	0	0	0	0	0
