= Affton, Missouri =

Unincorporated community in Missouri, U.S.

- Unincorporated community Census-designated place
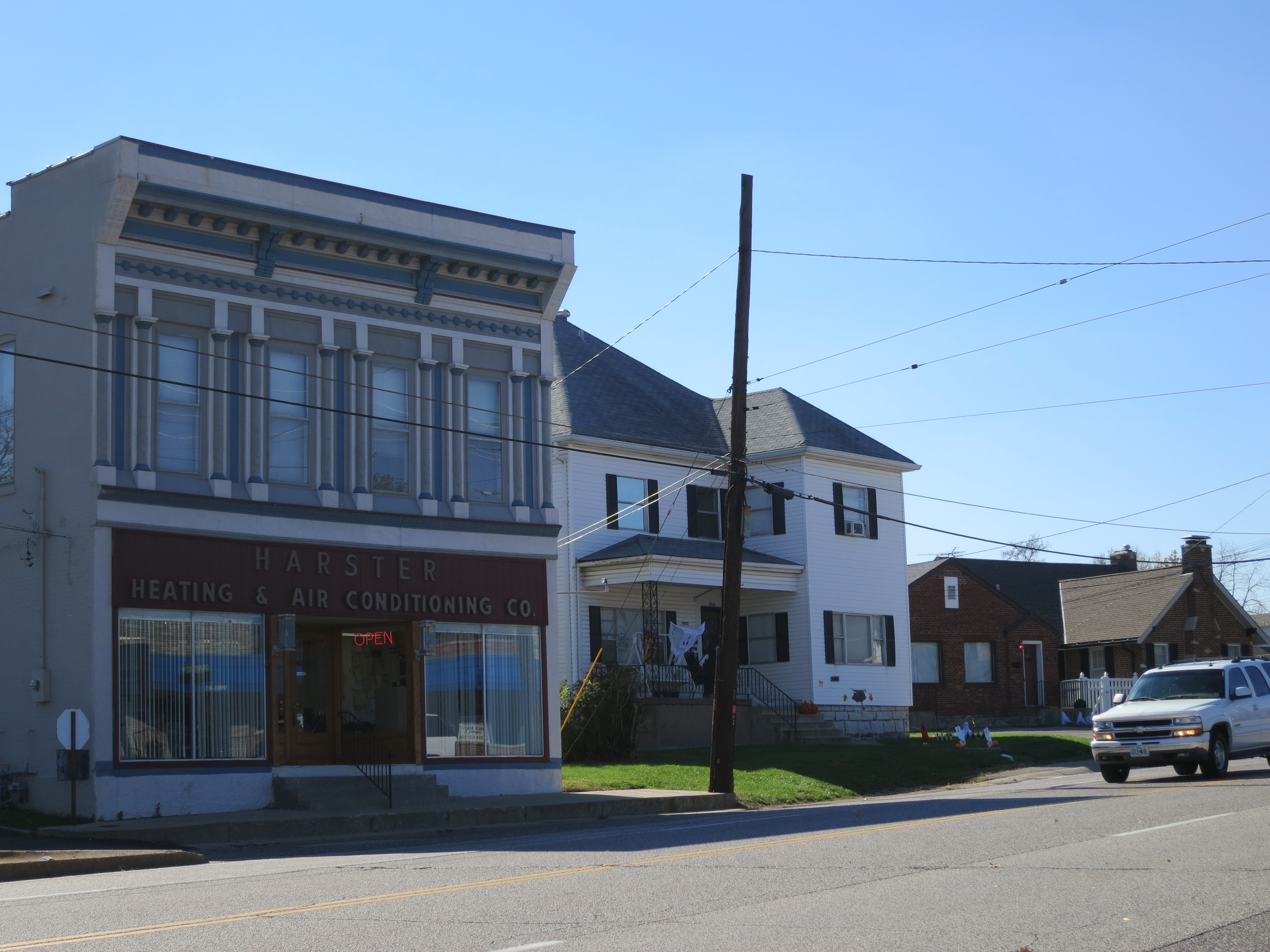
- Buildings in Affton, Missouri, October 2012

- Location of Affton, Missouri
- Coordinates: 38°33′00″N 90°19′35″W
- Country: United States
- State: Missouri
- County: St. Louis
- Townships: Concord, Gravois

Area
  - Total: 4.57 sq mi (11.84 km^{2})
  - Land: 4.57 sq mi (11.84 km^{2})
  - Water: 0 sq mi (0.00 km^{2})
- Elevation: 558 ft (170 m)

Population (2020)
  - Total: 20,417
  - Density: 4,467.2/sq mi (1,724.78/km^{2})
- Time zone: UTC-6 (Central (CST))
  - Summer (DST): UTC-5 (CDT)
- ZIP code: 63123
- FIPS code: 29-00280
- GNIS feature ID: 2393314

Affton is an unincorporated community and census-designated place (CDP) in south St. Louis County, Missouri, United States, near St. Louis. The population was 20,417 at the 2020 United States census.

== History ==
Affton is named for the first Postmaster for the area, Johann Aff.

Early landowners included fur trader and liquor importer Kenneth McKenzie and Louis Auguste Benoist.

== Geography ==
According to the United States Census Bureau, the community has a total area of 4.6 square miles (12 km^{2}), all land.

== Demographics ==
Historical population
Census	Pop.	Note	%±
1970	24,464		—
1980	23,181		−5.2%
1990	21,106		−9.0%
2000	20,535		−2.7%
2010	20,307		−1.1%
2020	20,417		0.5%

=== Racial and ethnic composition ===
Affton CDP, Missouri – Racial and ethnic composition Note: the US Census treats Hispanic/Latino as an ethnic category. This table excludes Latinos from the racial categories and assigns them to a separate category. Hispanics/Latinos may be of any race.
Race / Ethnicity (NH = Non-Hispanic)	Pop 2000	Pop 2010	Pop 2020	% 2000	% 2010	% 2020
White alone (NH)	19,686	18,845	17,362	95.87%	92.80%	85.04%
Black or African American alone (NH)	93	337	578	0.45%	1.66%	2.83%
Native American or Alaska Native alone (NH)	35	26	32	0.17%	0.13%	0.16%
Asian alone (NH)	265	409	725	1.29%	2.01%	3.55%
Native Hawaiian or Pacific Islander alone (NH)	5	3	6	0.02%	0.01%	0.03%
Other race alone (NH)	22	18	76	0.11%	0.09%	0.37%
Mixed race or Multiracial (NH)	222	250	946	1.08%	1.23%	4.63%
Hispanic or Latino (any race)	207	419	692	1.01%	2.06%	3.39%
Total	20,535	20,307	20,417	100.00%	100.00%	100.00%

=== 2020 census ===
As of the 2020 census, Affton had a population of 20,417. The median age was 41.1 years. 19.0% of residents were under the age of 18 and 19.1% of residents were 65 years of age or older. For every 100 females there were 93.6 males, and for every 100 females age 18 and over there were 90.5 males age 18 and over.

100.0% of residents lived in urban areas, while 0.0% lived in rural areas.

There were 9,187 households in Affton, of which 23.6% had children under the age of 18 living in them. Of all households, 42.4% were married-couple households, 18.9% were households with a male householder and no spouse or partner present, and 31.3% were households with a female householder and no spouse or partner present. About 35.7% of all households were made up of individuals and 15.6% had someone living alone who was 65 years of age or older.

There were 9,579 housing units, of which 4.1% were vacant. The homeowner vacancy rate was 1.0% and the rental vacancy rate was 4.7%.

Racial composition as of the 2020 census
Race	Number	Percent
White	17,523	85.8%
Black or African American	592	2.9%
American Indian and Alaska Native	49	0.2%
Asian	734	3.6%
Native Hawaiian and Other Pacific Islander	7	0.0%
Some other race	223	1.1%
Two or more races	1,289	6.3%
Hispanic or Latino (of any race)	692	3.4%

=== 2000 census ===
As of the census of 2000, there were 20,535 people, 8,892 households, and 5,655 families residing in the CDP. The population density was 4,480.1 inhabitants per square mile (1,729.8/km^{2}). There were 9,128 housing units at an average density of 1,991.5 per square mile (768.9/km^{2}). The racial makeup of the CDP was 97.62% White, 0.06% Black, 0.01% American Indian, 1.30% Asian, 0.03% Pacific Islander, 0.28% from other races, and 1.13% from two or more races. 1.01% of the population were Hispanic or Latino of any race.

There were 8,892 households, out of which 26.5% had children under the age of 18 living with them, 51.1% were married couples living together, 9.5% had a female householder with no husband present, and 36.4% were non-families. 31.9% of all households were made up of individuals, and 14.0% had someone living alone who was 65 years of age or older. The average household size was 2.31 and the average family size was 2.93.

In the CDP, the population was spread out, with 21.9% under the age of 18, 6.9% from 18 to 24, 30.3% from 25 to 44, 21.4% from 45 to 64, and 19.5% who were 65 years of age or older. The median age was 40 years. For every 100 females, there were 89.1 males. For every 100 females age 18 and over, there were 85.0 males.

The median income for a household in the CDP was $43,327, and the median income for a family was $54,881. Males had a median income of $38,141 versus $28,397 for females. The per capita income for the CDP was $22,059. 3.6% of the population and 2.1% of families were below the poverty line. 3.9% of those under the age of 18 and 4.1% of those 65 and older were living below the poverty line.

== Education ==
The Bayless School District, Lutheran High School South, Affton School District, and Holy Cross Academy (St. John Paul II campus) are all found in the area known as Affton.

== Notable people ==
- Derek Blasberg, fashion writer, attended Affton High School
- Jack Dorsey, Twitter and Square co-founder, lived in Affton during childhood
- Markus Golden, Arizona Cardinals football player, attended Affton High School
- John Goodman, actor, born and raised in Affton, attended Affton High School
- Kristeen Young, musician, raised in Affton
