= Jason Davis (American football) =

American football player (born 1983)

No. 43, 34, 47, 33
- Position: Fullback

Personal information
- Born: November 2, 1983 (age 43); St. Louis, Missouri, U.S.
- Listed height: 5 ft 10 in (1.78 m)
- Listed weight: 242 lb (110 kg)

Career information
- High school: Lindbergh (MO)
- College: Illinois
- NFL draft: 2006: undrafted

Career history
- Philadelphia Eagles (2006–2007); Chicago Bears (2008)*; Oakland Raiders (2008); Chicago Bears (2008); New York Jets (2009–2010)*; Hartford Colonials (2010); Virginia Destroyers (2011)
- * Offseason or practice squad member only

Awards and highlights
- UFL champion (2011)

Career NFL statistics
- Receptions: 5
- Receiving yards: 17
- Rushing yards: 15
- Stats at Pro Football Reference

Jason Sidney Arthur Davis (born November 2, 1983) is an American former professional football player who was a fullback in the National Football League (NFL). He played college football for the Illinois Fighting Illini and was signed by the Philadelphia Eagles as an undrafted free agent in 2006.

Davis was also a member of the Chicago Bears, Oakland Raiders, New York Jets, Hartford Colonials and Virginia Destroyers.

== Early life ==
Davis attended Lindbergh High School in St. Louis, Missouri, where he was a four-year starter. Davis played offense and defense in high school. He led Lindbergh to its first-ever district title and a berth in the state playoffs and tallied 54 tackles and three interceptions as a senior He was named second-team All-South by the St. Louis Post-Dispatch as both a defensive back and wide receiver. He also played on the basketball team and was a member of the state champion 4 × 100 m relay team in 2000.

== College career ==
Davis attended the University of Illinois Urbana-Champaign and played fullback for the Illini. He became a starter as a junior in 2004 and caught 41 passes for 340 yards and two touchdowns while running for 230 yards and a touchdown.

== Professional career ==
Davis was not selected in the 2006 NFL draft but signed with the Philadelphia Eagles as an undrafted free agent. He played in his first NFL game in 2008 with the Oakland Raiders. He also started in three games for the Chicago Bears in 2008.

The New York Jets claimed Davis off waivers on September 6, 2009.

Jason was featured on the reality sports documentary television series Hard Knocks produced by NFL Films and HBO. The series followed the New York Jets through its 2010 training camp and the team's preparation for the upcoming season. The battle for the starting fullback position between Jason, veteran Tony Richardson, and rookie John Conner was heavily featured. On September 3, 2010, the Jets waived Davis as the team began to make roster cutdowns.

On October 18, 2010, Jason Davis joined the Hartford Colonials of the United Football League (UFL).
