= Ulysses S. Grant National Historic Site =

National Historic Site of the United States

- White Haven; Ulysses S. Grant National Historic Site
- U.S. National Register of Historic Places
- U.S. National Historic Landmark
- U.S. National Historic Site
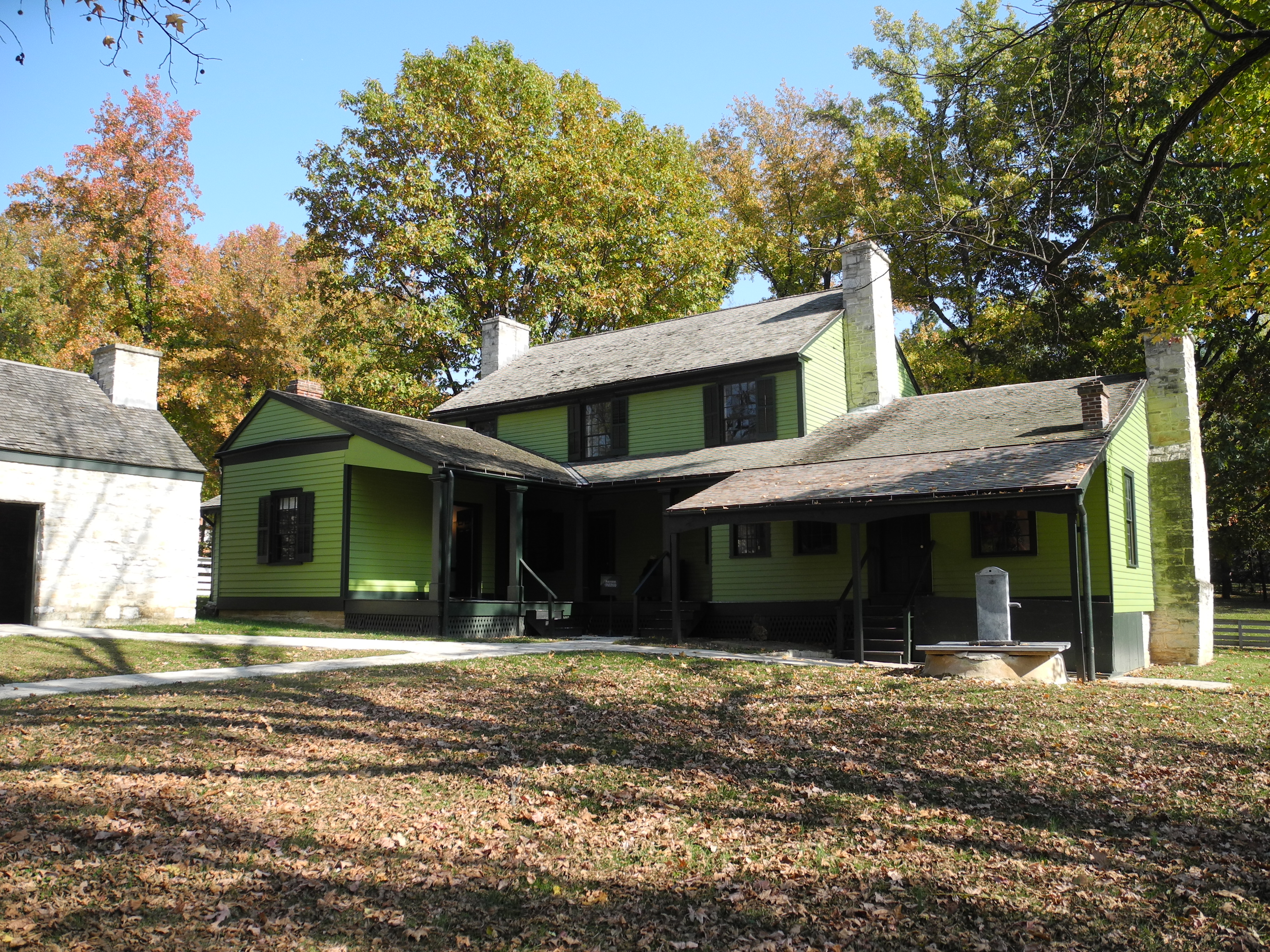

- Location within St. Louis Location within Missouri Location within the United States
- Coordinates: 38°33′4″N 90°21′7″W
- Area: 9.9 acres (4.0 ha)
- Built: 1795
- Built by: Long, William Lindsay
- Visitation: 37,467 (2025)
- Website: Ulsses S. Grant National Historic Site
- Part of: Grantwood Village, Missouri
- NRHP reference No.: 79003205

Significant dates
- Added to NRHP: April 4, 1979
- Designated NHL: June 23, 1986

Ulysses S. Grant National Historic Site is a 9.65-acre (3.91 ha) United States National Historic Site located 10 miles (16 km) southwest of downtown St. Louis, Missouri, within the municipality of Grantwood Village, Missouri. The site, also known as White Haven, commemorates the life, military career and presidency of Ulysses S. Grant. Five historic structures are preserved at the site, including the childhood home of Ulysses' wife, Julia Dent Grant.

White Haven was an 850-acre plantation worked by enslaved people; Grant worked on his own separate farm on the same property, alongside enslaved people doing the same work.

== History ==
After his marriage to Julia, Grant was stationed in Michigan and New York. Julia traveled with him to these posts, returning to White Haven in 1850 for the birth of their first child, Fred. When Ulysses was sent west in 1852, Julia was not able to go with him, being pregnant with their second child. She returned to her parents' home after stopping at Ulysses' parents' home in Ohio, where Ulysses Jr., was born. Grant's army pay was insufficient to bring his family out to the West Coast, and he tried several business ventures to supplement his income. Suffering from depression and loneliness after being separated for two years, Grant finally resigned from the army in 1854 and returned to White Haven.

Grant farmed the White Haven property for his father-in-law, working with the slaves owned by Julia's father. Two more children were born, Ellen, born on July 4, 1855, and Jesse, in February 1858. Due to a financial panic in 1857, along with bad weather that destroyed many farmers' crops, Ulysses worked for a short time in the city of St. Louis in real estate and as an engineer. In 1860, Ulysses, Julia, and their four children moved to Galena, Illinois. Ulysses worked with his brothers selling leather goods made in their father's tannery.

=== Slavery at White Haven ===
A large number of enslaved people lived and worked at White Haven. According to the National Park Service, during the 1850s slave labor "was used extensively in the farming and maintenance of the 850-acre plantation." From 1854 to 1859, Grant lived here with his wife, Julia, and their children, managing the farm for his father-in-law, Colonel Dent. His experience running this may have influenced him in his later roles as the Union general in the Civil War and as President of the United States.

=== The setting ===
Most slaveholders in Missouri enslaved few people; those who owned ten were considered wealthy. In the southeastern Bootheel area and along the fertile Missouri River valley known as "little Dixie," large, single-crop plantations predominated, with an intensive use of enslaved labor. Elsewhere in the state, large farms produced a variety of staples, including hemp, wheat, oats, hay, and corn. On many of these estates the owner worked alongside his slaves to harvest the greatest economic benefit from the land. This forced labor system was less entrenched in the city of St. Louis, where the African American population was 2% in 1860, down from 25% in 1830. Enslaved people were often "hired out" by their masters in return for an agreed upon wage. A portion of the wage was sometimes paid to enslaved people, allowing a measure of self-determination and in rare cases the opportunity to purchase their freedom.

=== Early farm residents and slavery ===
Each of the farm's early residents enslaved people during their tenure on the Gravois property. When Theodore and Anne Lucas Hunt purchased William Lindsay Long's home in 1818, there existed "several good log cabins" on the property—potential quarters for the five enslaved people purchased earlier by Hunt. The work of Walace, Andrew, Lydia, Loutette, and Adie would be an important part of the Hunts' farming venture. The Hunts sold the Gravois property to Frederick Dent in 1820, for the sum of $6,000 (~$190,143 in 2025). Naming the property "White Haven" after his family home in Maryland, Colonel Dent considered himself a Southern gentleman with enslaved people whom he could force to do the farmwork. By the 1850s, 18 people were enslaved at White Haven.

=== Growing up as an enslaved person ===
In 1830, half of the people enslaved by Dent were under the age of ten. Henrietta, Sue, Ann, and Jeff, among other enslaved people, played with the Dent children. Julia Dent recalled that they fished for minnows, climbed trees for bird nests, and gathered strawberries. However, slave children also had chores such as feeding chickens and cows, and they mastered their assigned tasks as the white children went off to school. Returning home from boarding school, Julia noted the transition from playmate to servant. She noted that the enslaved girls had "attained the dignity of white aprons." These aprons symbolized forced labor, a departure from the less structured days of childhood play.

=== Household responsibilities ===
Enslaved adults performed many household chores on the Dent plantation. Kitty and Rose served as nurses to Julia and Emma, while Mary Robinson became the family cook. The wide variety of foods prepared in her kitchen were highly praised by Julia: "Such loaves of beautiful snowy cake, such plates full of delicious Maryland biscuit, such exquisite custards and puddings, such omelettes, gumbo soup, and fritters." An enslaved man named "Old Bob," who traveled with the Dents from Maryland in 1816, had the responsibility to keep the fires going in White Haven's seven fireplaces. Julia thought Bob was careless to allow the embers to die out, as this forced him "to walk a mile to some neighbors and bring home a brand of fire from their backlog." Such "carelessness" provided Bob and many other enslaved people an opportunity to escape their masters' eyes.

=== Tending the farm ===
Forced labor was used extensively in the farming and maintenance of the 850-acre plantation. Using the "best improvements in farm machinery" owned by Colonel Dent, field hands plowed, sowed and reaped the wheat, oats, Irish potatoes, and Indian corn grown on the estate. Enslaved people also cared for the orchards and gardens, harvesting the fruits and vegetables for consumption by all who lived on the property. During Grant's management of the farm, he worked side by side with Dan, one of the enslaved people given to Julia at birth. Grant, along with Dan and other enslaved people, felled trees and took firewood by wagon to sell to acquaintances in St. Louis. More than 75 horses, cattle, and pigs required daily attention, while grounds maintenance and numerous remodeling projects on the main house and outbuildings used the skills of enslaved people.

=== Personal lives ===
Enslaved people claimed time for socializing amid their chores. Corn shuckings provided one opportunity to come together as a community to eat, drink, sing, and visit, often including slaves from nearby plantations. Participation in religious activities, individually or as a group, also provided a sense of integrity. Julia remembered "Old Bob" going into the meadow to pray and sing. According to historian Lorenzo J. Greene, "St. Louis…was the only place in the state where the organized black church achieved any measure of success." It is unknown whether Dent allowed the people he enslaved to attend services.

=== Freedom ===
In Mary Robinson's July 24, 1885, recollections, during an interview for the Missouri Republican's memorial to Grant following his death, she noted that "he always said he wanted to give his wife's slaves their freedom as soon as he was able." In 1859, Grant freed William Jones, the only person he is known to have enslaved. During the Civil War, some enslaved people at White Haven simply walked off, as they did on many plantations in both Union and Confederate states. Missouri's constitutional convention abolished slavery in the state in January 1865, freeing any enslaved people still living at White Haven.

"I Ulysses S. Grant... do hereby manumit, emancipate and set free from Slavery my Negro man William, sometimes called William Jones... forever."

== Post-Grant history ==
The Grants turned White Haven over to William Henry Vanderbilt in 1881, to satisfy a loan Vanderbilt gave Grant after one of the latter's financial partners absconded with embezzled investment funds. A portion of the plantation was later purchased by Adolphus Busch, where he developed his Grant's Farm property, and the acreage around the main house was rescued from development of a Grant-themed amusement park in 1913 by Albert Wenzlick, a St. Louis real estate developer. The house was maintained by Wenzlick and his son until the latter's death in 1979. The property was listed on the National Register of Historic Places in 1979, and was designated a National Historic Landmark in 1986.

In 1989, White Haven became a part of the National Park Service, and is currently one of more than 400 sites managed by that agency.

== See also ==
- General Grant National Memorial (Grant's Tomb), New York City, New York
- Grant Cottage State Historic Site, on Mount McGregor, Wilton, New York
- Ulysses S. Grant Home, Galena, Illinois
- Grant Boyhood Home, Georgetown, Ohio
- Grant Birthplace, Point Pleasant, Ohio
- Grant's Farm
- History of slavery in Missouri
- List of National Historic Landmarks in Missouri
- National Register of Historic Places listings in St. Louis County, Missouri
