= Sappington, Missouri =

- Unincorporated community Census-designated place
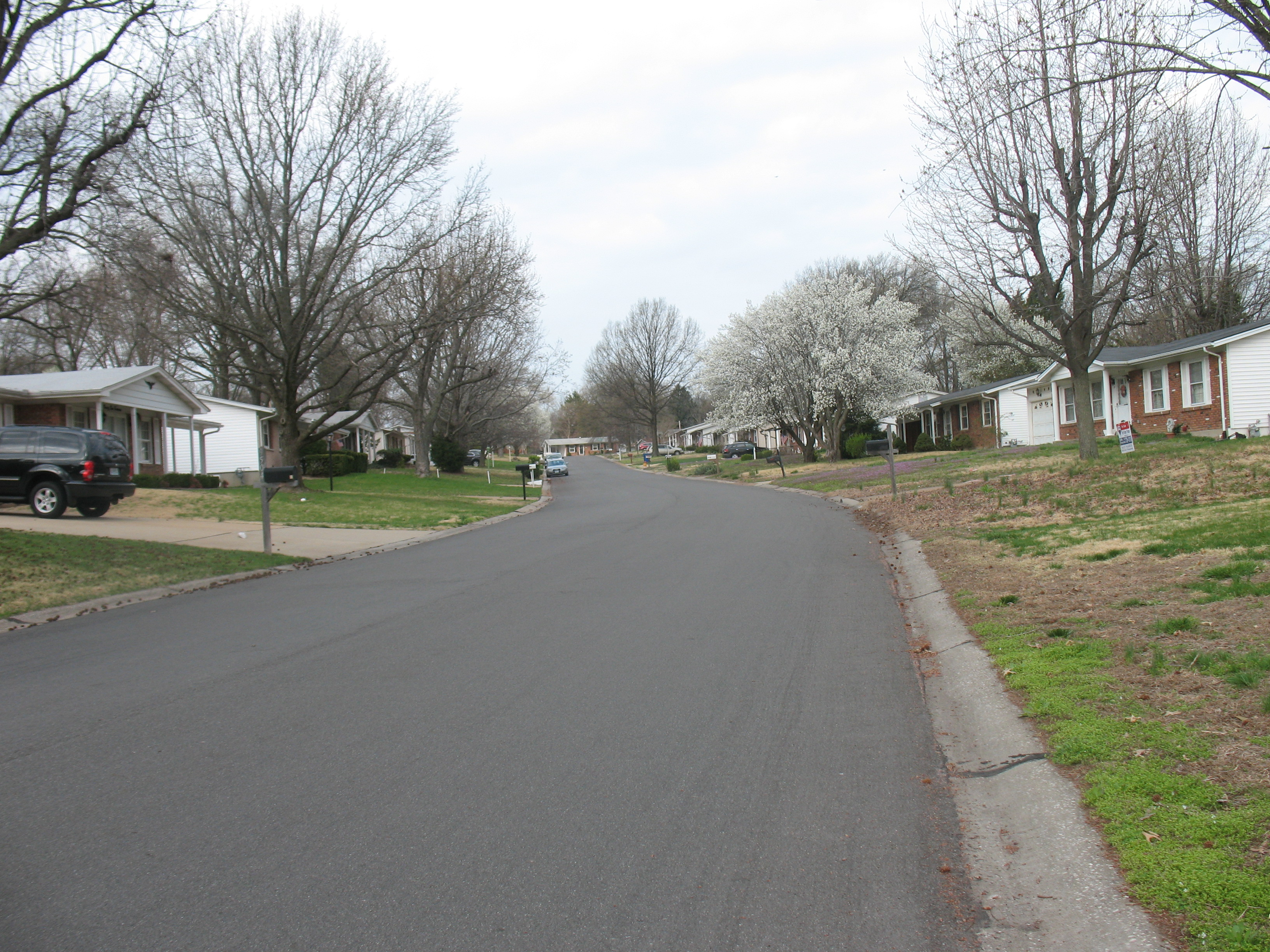

- Location of Sappington, Missouri
- Coordinates: 38°31′34″N 90°22′23″W
- Country: United States
- State: Missouri
- County: St. Louis
- Townships: Concord, Gravois, Tesson Ferry

Area
  - Total: 2.39 sq mi (6.20 km^{2})
  - Land: 2.39 sq mi (6.20 km^{2})
  - Water: 0 sq mi (0.00 km^{2})
- Elevation: 617 ft (188 m)

Population (2020)
  - Total: 7,995
  - Density: 3,340.1/sq mi (1,289.62/km^{2})
- Time zone: UTC-6 (Central (CST))
  - Summer (DST): UTC-5 (CDT)
- ZIP codes: 63126, 63128
- Area code(s): 314/557
- FIPS code: 29-65954
- GNIS feature ID: 2393224

Sappington is an unincorporated community and census-designated place (CDP) in St. Louis County, Missouri, United States. The population was 7,995 at the 2020 census.

== History ==
Sappington was named for a family of pioneer settlers. After Daniel Boone settled in modern-day Missouri, he would often return to Kentucky to tell residents about the land available in Missouri. John and Jemima Sappington sent two sons and a son-in-law to explore what is now Sappington in 1804. They bought 1,920 acres (3 square miles) of land - more than the area of present-day Sappington. The following year, the rest of the Sappington family arrived in the area. The descendants of the family eventually populated the area, and parts of present-day Crestwood and Sunset Hills. The house of Thomas Sappington, one of the original settlers, still exists and is maintained by the City of Crestwood.

== Geography ==
According to the United States Census Bureau, the community has a total area of 2.6 square miles (6.7 km^{2}), of which 0.1 square miles (0.26 km^{2}), or 2.30%, is water.

== Demographics ==
Historical population
Year	Pop.	±%
2000	7,287	—
2010	7,580	+4.0%
2020	7,995	+5.5%
Source: U.S. Decennial Census

=== Racial and ethnic composition ===
Sappington CDP, Missouri – Racial and ethnic composition Note: the US Census treats Hispanic/Latino as an ethnic category. This table excludes Latinos from the racial categories and assigns them to a separate category. Hispanics/Latinos may be of any race.
Race / Ethnicity (NH = Non-Hispanic)	Pop 2000	Pop 2010	Pop 2020	% 2000	% 2010	% 2020
White alone (NH)	6,980	6,999	6,987	95.79%	92.34%	87.39%
Black or African American alone (NH)	47	112	151	0.64%	1.48%	1.89%
Native American or Alaska Native alone (NH)	7	5	7	0.10%	0.07%	0.09%
Asian alone (NH)	132	205	241	1.81%	2.70%	3.01%
Native Hawaiian or Pacific Islander alone (NH)	0	3	1	0.00%	0.04%	0.01%
Other race alone (NH)	1	5	15	0.01%	0.07%	0.19%
Mixed race or Multiracial (NH)	45	105	318	0.62%	1.39%	3.98%
Hispanic or Latino (any race)	75	146	275	1.03%	1.93%	3.44%
Total	7,287	7,580	7,995	100.00%	100.00%	100.00%

=== 2020 census ===
As of the 2020 census, Sappington had a population of 7,995. The median age was 44.2 years. 21.3% of residents were under the age of 18 and 23.7% of residents were 65 years of age or older. For every 100 females there were 87.5 males, and for every 100 females age 18 and over there were 83.6 males age 18 and over.

100.0% of residents lived in urban areas, while 0.0% lived in rural areas.

There were 3,531 households in Sappington, of which 26.9% had children under the age of 18 living in them. Of all households, 45.1% were married-couple households, 17.3% were households with a male householder and no spouse or partner present, and 33.0% were households with a female householder and no spouse or partner present. About 35.7% of all households were made up of individuals and 20.5% had someone living alone who was 65 years of age or older.

There were 3,738 housing units, of which 5.5% were vacant. The homeowner vacancy rate was 1.1% and the rental vacancy rate was 8.3%.

=== 2010 census ===
In 2010, there were 7,580 people, 3,520 households and 2,066 families living in the community. The population density was 2,915 people per square mile. There were 3,756 housing units. The racial makeup of the community was 93.6% White, 1.5% African American, 0.1% Native American, 2.7% Asian, 0.4% from other races, and 1.7% from two or more races. Hispanic or Latino of any race made up 1.9% of the population.

There were 3,520 households, of which 18.6% had children under the age of 18 living with them, 46.1% were married couples living together, 9.3% had a female householder with no husband present, and 41.3% were non-families. 37.6% of all households were made up individuals and 19.5% had someone living alone who was 65 years of age or older. The average household size was 2.15 and the average family size was 2.85.

19.7% of the population were under the age of 18, 4.2% from 18 to 24, 21.3% from 25 to 44, 28.4% from 45 to 64, and 24.1% who were 65 years of age or older. The median age was 47.2 years. For every 100 females, there were 88.63 males.

The Median Household Income was $52,574 and the median family income was $73,364. The per capita income was $31,613. About 5.0% of families and 4.9% of the population were below the poverty line, including 6.6% of those under the age of 18 and 7.6% of those age 65 and over

=== 2000 census ===
At the 2000 census, there were 7,287 people, 3,403 households and 2,038 families living in the community. The population density was 2,850.5 inhabitants per square mile (1,100.6/km^{2}). There were 3,530 housing units at an average density of 1,380.8 per square mile (533.1/km^{2}). The racial makeup of the community was 96.53% White, 0.64% African American, 0.11% Native American, 1.83% Asian, 0.12% from other races, and 0.77% from two or more races. Hispanic or Latino of any race were 1.03% of the population.

There were 3,403 households, of which 21.1% had children under the age of 18 living with them, 49.3% were married couples living together, 8.2% had a female householder with no husband present, and 40.1% were non-families. 36.5% of all households were made up of individuals, and 19.7% had someone living alone who was 65 years of age or older. The average household size was 2.14 and the average family size was 2.81.

18.5% of the population were under the age of 18, 6.7% from 18 to 24, 23.3% from 25 to 44, 25.6% from 45 to 64, and 25.9% who were 65 years of age or older. The median age was 46 years. For every 100 females, there were 85.3 males. For every 100 females age 18 and over, there were 80.0 males.

The median household income was $44,117 and the median family income was $57,897. Males had a median income of $43,565 and females $30,906. The per capita income was $26,727. About 2.1% of families and 2.9% of the population were below the poverty line, including 3.7% of those under age 18 and 3.7% of those age 65 or over.

== Education ==
The school district Lindbergh Schools serves Sappington as well as the surrounding areas. Lindbergh High School is in Sappington, as is Sperreng Middle School, and Concord Elementary School (all part of the Lindbergh School District).
