= Lindbergh High School (Missouri) =

American high school in Missouri

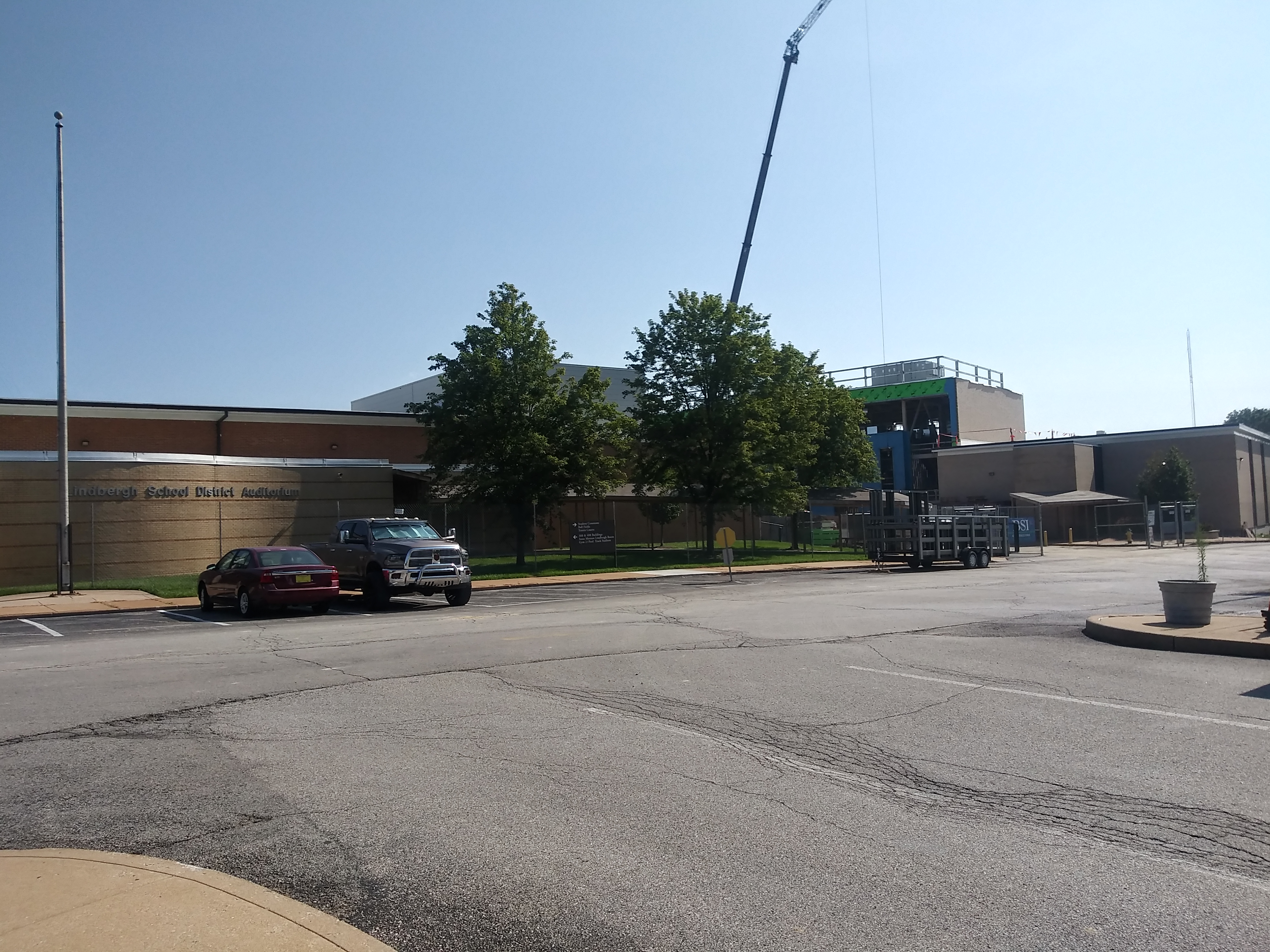

Location
- 5000 Lindbergh Boulevard; Sappington, Missouri; United States; 38.5292°N 90.3760°W

Information
- Type: Public high school
- Established: 1951; 75 years ago
- School district: Lindbergh Schools
- Principal: Eric Cochran
- Faculty: 150+
- Teaching staff: 130.68 (FTE)
- Grades: 9–12
- Enrollment: 2,266 (2023–24)
- Student to teacher ratio: 17.34
- Campus: Suburban
- Colors: Green and gold
- Athletics conference: Suburban Conference
- Nickname: Flyers
- Newspaper: Pilot
- Yearbook: Spirit
- Website: lhs.lindberghschools.ws

Lindbergh High School is the sole public high school in the Lindbergh School District. It is in Sappington, an unincorporated area in St. Louis County, Missouri. The 2022 graduating class had 555 students.

== History ==
The school district was founded in 1949, but the first schools appeared in the district as far back as 1939. The high school was originally named Grandview. Its mascot was the Griffin and the school colors were maroon and gold. During the high school's first academic year in 1950–51, classes were held in the basement and boiler room of the district's Sappington School elementary building. Construction began on the new high school in 1951, and classes began at the site in September of that year, even though the building was still under construction.

The school district decided that the name Grandview sounded too much like a rest home, so in April 1952, the school was renamed Lindbergh, after world-acclaimed pilot Charles Lindbergh. Its students became the Flyers and the school colors became green and gold. The mascot later became Lindy, sporting a chicken or eagle-like costume. In the fall of 2007, Lindy sported a new look: A black eagle, sporting a flight jacket, aviation cap and aviation goggles, as part of The Green Machine, a student spirit organization known for its rowdy antics. In 1957 the district also adopted the name, becoming the Lindbergh School District. Several new school buildings were created over the following years, several of which later closed as a result of a declining student population.

Over the past three decades, the district's population waned (and aged, leading to childless senior citizens), causing the student body to drop significantly over the years. Lindbergh was the first school in Missouri to offer the International Baccalaureate program, and Lindbergh High School is the secondary school home of the St. Louis Regional Program for Exceptionally Gifted Students (PEGS). In 1995 the school received $25 million for construction and improved facilities through the approval of bond measure, Proposition R. In 2000 and 2003 similar propositions were passed, giving the school additional revenues for improvements of infrastructure and facilities.

=== Proposition R and construction ===
In April 2019, voters who live in the district approved Proposition R, which would spend $105 million (to be raised by a bond issue, without raising taxes) on construction projects in the district. $80 million was allocated to demolish and rebuild parts of the high school (the school consists of multiple buildings), with the other $25 million spent on constructing secure entrances in other schools. The proposition was approved with 77% of the vote (57.15% was needed to approve the measure). The project is organized into three phases.

Phase 1 began in May 2020 and was completed in September 2020. It included the demolition of the old Math Building and main office and the installation of a utility building on the site of the Math Building. Phase 1 also included removal of asbestos, which was a problem on the nearly 70 year old campus. Construction was done by Wachter, Inc. (with the exception of the asbestos work, which was done by Talbert, Inc.)

Phase 2 began in September 2020 and is scheduled to be completed in January 2023. It consists of remodeling existing buildings and building a new 3-story building that will connect buildings on campus. Construction was done by BSI Constructors, Inc.

Phase 3 is scheduled to begin in January 2023 and will involve demolishing the Auditorium and another building, and repaving parking areas. The contractor has not yet been selected.

== Athletics ==
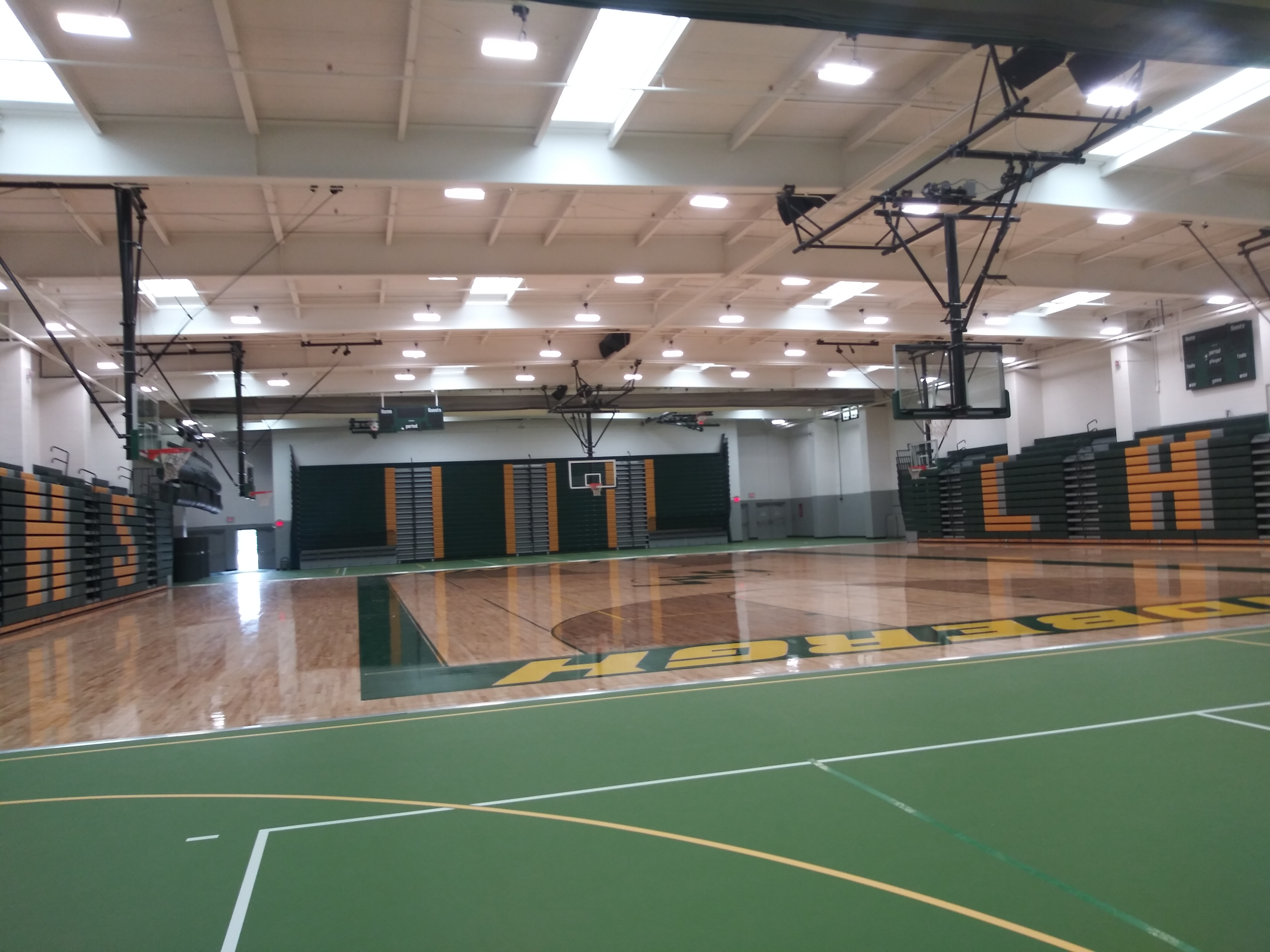
One of the two gyms at Lindbergh High School (May 2021)

The Lindbergh Flyers have had success in several sports, including state championships in the following:

- Boys' cross country - 1972, 1974, 1975, 1976, 1977, 1978
- Girls' cross country - 1979
- Boys' golf - 1970, 1972
- Girls' golf - 1981
- Boys' soccer - 1994
- Girls' fall season softball - 1984
- Boys' swimming and diving - 1973
- Boys' tennis - 1975, 1980, 1984
- Girls' tennis - 1980, 1981

== Student organizations ==
The Spirit of St. Louis Marching Band participated in the Rose Parade in Pasadena, California for the third time on January 1, 2018.

== Recognition and awards ==
- In 1996, Lindbergh's student newspaper, Pilot Newsmagazine, was recognized by the National Scholastic Press Association with a Best of the Net award (now known as the Online Pacemaker).
- In 2000, The Lindbergh Spirit Yearbook received an Interactive Yearbook Pacemaker
- In 2005, Lindbergh's student television station, KLHS-TV, was nominated for the NSPA Broadcast Pacemaker.
- In 2005 the school was ranked #925 in Newsweek Magazine's "1000 Best High Schools in the Country” list.
- In 2006 LHS was recognized again on the list of "1000 Best High Schools in the Country”, improving its ranking to #679, and #733 of all schools in the nation.
- In 2006, the school's Spirit of St. Louis Marching Band won the annual Greater St. Louis Marching Band Festival (GSL) in the Gold Division with a score of 79.85.
- In 2006, the school district was recognized by the Missouri Department of Elementary and Secondary Education with their "Distinction in Performance" award.
- In 2007, Lindbergh's Mock Trial team took second place in the Missouri state finals.
- In 2008, Lindbergh was distinguished with eleven National Merit Finalists and five Commended students in the 2008 competition.
- In 2011, The Spirit of St. Louis Marching Band again participated in the Tournament of Roses Parade. They also placed 11th at the annual Bands of America Super Regional Event in Saint Louis.
- In 2018, The Spirit of St. Louis Marching Band was again invited to participate the Tournament of Roses Parade.
- In 2022, Lindbergh's Envirothon team went to Envirothon Internationals for the first time in school history, placing 11th overall.
- In 2022, The Spirit of St. Louis Marching Band placed 14th at the annual Bands of America Super Regional Event in Saint Louis.
- In 2023, The Spirit of St. Louis Marching Band placed 14th at the annual Bands of America Super Regional Event in Saint Louis, for the 2nd year in a row.

== Notable alumni ==
- Joe Boever, former Major League baseball player
- Brock Bond, former professional baseball player
- Jason Davis, former professional American football player
- Stephen A. Fulling, mathematician and mathematical physicist
- Jan Garavaglia, medical examiner and television personality
- James Kinsella, tech entrepreneur and former president of MSNBC.com
- Bob Lee, murdered tech executive and the founder of Cash App
- Michael O’Donnell, politician
- Josh Outman, former Major League baseball player
- Jake Parnell, professional wrestler known as Warhorse
- Rico Payton, NFL cornerback for the New Orleans Saints
- Ariane Rinehart, actress and performer
- Philip Sneed aka "Moon Valjean", Platinum selling artist with Goldfinger, Greek Fire, Story of the Year and co-host on KPNT's The Rizzuto Show
- Josephine Staton, U.S. federal judge
- Scott Trowbridge, Entertainment Creator for Walt Disney Imagineering
- Colleen Young, paralympic swimmer
