= Bayless Senior High School =

Public high school in Missouri, US

Location
- 4532 Weber Road; Affton, Missouri; United States; 38.5520°N 90.3014°W

Information
- Type: Public school
- Established: 1868; 158 years ago
- School board: Bayless School Board
- School district: Bayless Consolidated School District
- Superintendent: Amelia Ruzicka
- NCES School ID: 290450000044
- Principal of the Elementary: Aaron Kohler
- Principal of the Junior High: Daniel Bieser
- Principal of the High School: Eric Lawrence
- Teaching staff: 30.20 (on an FTE basis)
- Enrollment: 562 (2024–2025)
- Student to teacher ratio: 18.61
- Campus size: 12.14 acres (4.91 ha)
- Colors: Green and gold
- Athletics conference: South Central Athletic Association
- Nickname: Bronchos
- Website: hs.baylessk12.org

Bayless School District is a public school located in unincorporated south St. Louis County, Missouri. It Includes Bayless Early Childhood Center, Bayless Elementary School, Bayless Junior High School, and Bayless High School.

== History ==
=== 1800s ===
Bayless Schools can be traced back to 1868, when its first school, the "Old Rock School," was built by Veterans of the American Civil War, on a 1-acre parcel of land bought from Cornelia Forman for $250 ($2,200 in 2024).

=== 1900–1919 ===
In 1901, residents of the school district passed a $3,000 bond for a new school. In 1909, two different bond issues asking for a new school house were defeated, with one proposal asking for a $10,000 bond (defeated 32-47), and another asking for $15,000 for two new schoolhouses. At this time, Bayless had 159 students, of which 79 were boys and 80 were girls. Bayless only had three teachers with two school houses with three classrooms and a library that could only seat 144 students. Each teacher was paid $52 per month in 1909 and the library had 54 books valued at around $30, with the entire school district worth $5,000 in 1909. In 1910, the School board officially named themselves to the "Bayless Consolidated School District" in honor of Samuel Meade Bayles. In 1912, voters approved a bond for $18,000 for a two-three classroom schoolhouse. In that same year, the school district was divided into three wards. In 1915, voters rejected an $8,000 bond issue to build and furnish a 4-classroom schoolhouse.

=== 1920–1949 ===
Violet C. Bascom, an 8th Grade Teacher, began a 9th grade class with 11 students, of which only one was allowed to go to neighboring Webster Groves High School. Therefore she started a 9th grade class and used the second floor of the grade school teaching mathematics, English, science, physical education, history, commercial subjects, Latin, and music. Even with grave doubts about expanding education opportunities from the state high-school inspector, the following year, Bascom started a 10th grade (1929), and an 11th Grade the year after that (1930). In 1930, Bascom became Bayless' first superintendent. When the State inspector returned a year later, he was shown the $140,000 school with fully-equipped laboratories, gymnasium, music, typing rooms and regular classrooms; then was shown 160 students and asked by Bascom “Do you still think it was mistake to start a high school in this district?” He then gave his approval to Bayless' first high school, which allowed the first Junior-Senior prom and the first graduate class of seven students in 1932.

In 1933, a construction referendum was passed to allow construction for a new high school, now the Junior-High school, with help from the Works Progress Administration and Public Works Funding, and finished in October 1935. The Junior-High building was constructed to provide seven classrooms, teachers’ rooms, a principal’s office, a chemical laboratory, a library, and a combination auditorium-gymnasium with a stage and bleachers. In the 1940s, Bayless introduced Open House Nights for parents and educators to meet and elaborate on problems a student might be having. An Art class was added to the curriculum in 1941, and Bayless hosted an invitational basketball tournament in 1942. Violet Bascom retired in 1945 and was replaced by Hugo Beck a year later. In 1948, a special election on whether to provide free bus transportation was defeated.

=== 1950–1990s ===
In the 1950s, another school was built to accommodate grades 3–8 with Kindergarten and 2nd grades still at the Heege School. But by the late 1950s, the school was outgrown and an Intermediate school was built in 1960 to remove the strain on the school (both now are the Elementary School). In 1953, the Heege School closed and the 1st and 2nd Grades moved to the elementary. Hugo Beck retired in 1960 and was replaced by Gene Church. In 1957, construction of the current Bayless High School began, along with the new auditorium, after a referendum passed 592-205; it opened in 1958. Gene Church resigned as Superintendent in 1965 and was replaced by George Baxter. Bayless experienced a significant decline in enrollment through the 1970s to 1990s which closed the Central School and the Heege School (used by Kindergarten classes). Enrollment would not increase until the late 1990s and 2000s due to the Yugoslav Wars and the influx of Bosnian immigrants from the Bosnian War.

==== Desegregation ====
In 1970, Bayless, according to the United States Commission on Civil Rights, didn't have any Black Students. In 1978, Bayless enrolled six Black Students. In 2006, Bayless only enrolled 181 Black Students and 150 of those were transfer students.

=== 1990s–Now ===
In 1993, the Old High School was remodeled into the Bayless Junior High School and was opened. The following year, the Central School was demolished. In 1998, Bayless expanded the high school to include new science rooms and a new band room.

During the 2000s Bayless, along with increasing enrollment, received needed repairs and improvements such as Handicap access, HVAC systems, and new lighting. After failing to pass three tax increases for improvements, there were discussions about merging Bayless with the other South County School District; the discussions led nowhere.

In 2016, Bayless added a new field, a new ballpark, and a new multipurpose room which along with a central office and a library, connected the Elementary with the Intermediate School. In 2023, an expansion was completed on the Junior High after a failed attempt to do so in 2018.

== Notable alumni ==
- Sonny Siebert, professional baseball player
