= Grantwood Village, Missouri =

- Town
- Town of Grantwood Village
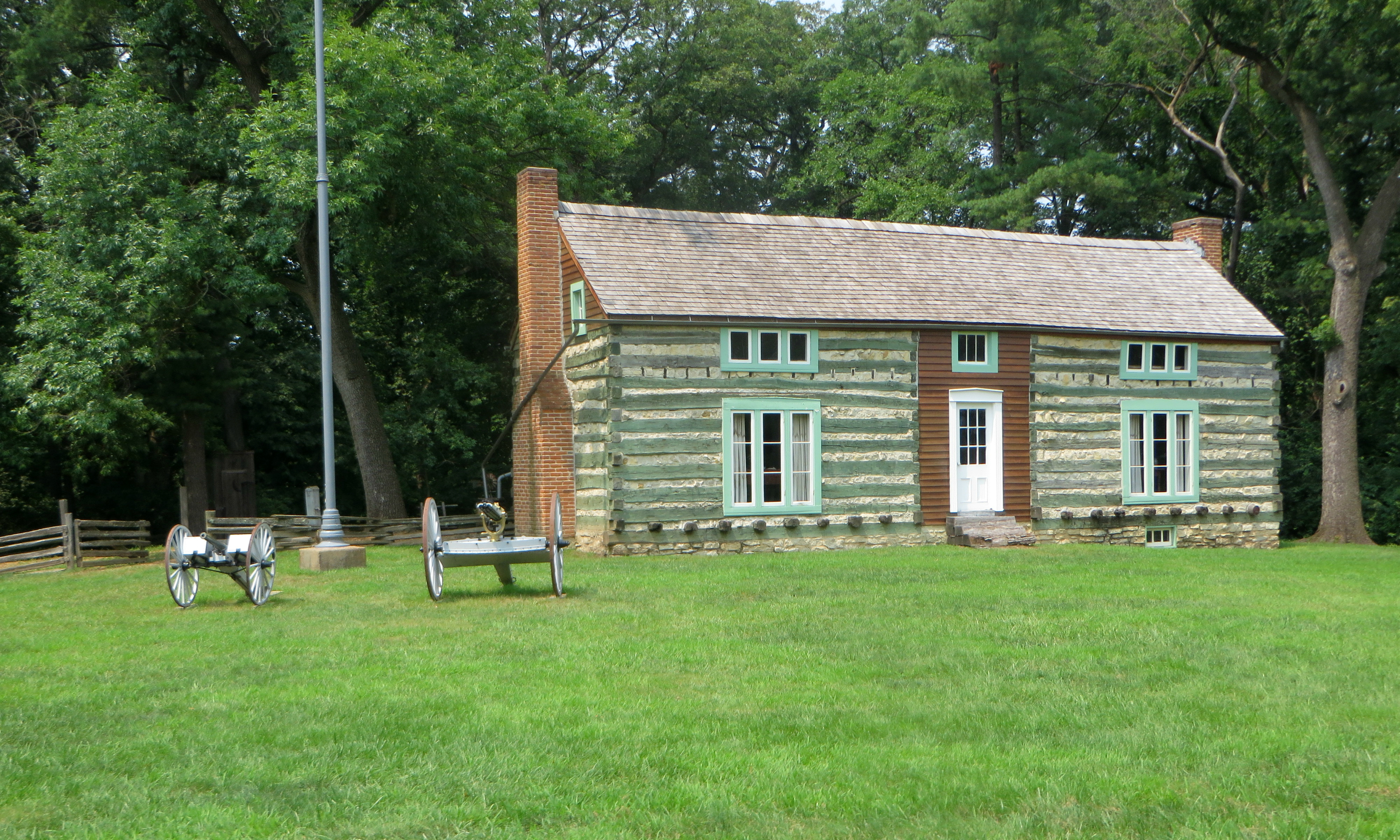
- Grant's log cabin in 2015, located on Grant's Farm in Grantwood Village

- Location of Grantwood Village, Missouri
- Coordinates: 38°33′03″N 90°21′11″W
- Country: United States
- State: Missouri
- County: St. Louis
- Township: Gravois

Area
  - Total: 0.83 sq mi (2.14 km^{2})
  - Land: 0.82 sq mi (2.12 km^{2})
  - Water: 0.012 sq mi (0.03 km^{2})
- Elevation: 492 ft (150 m)

Population (2020)
  - Total: 941
  - Density: 1,152.2/sq mi (444.86/km^{2})
- Time zone: UTC-6 (Central (CST))
  - Summer (DST): UTC-5 (CDT)
- ZIP code: 63123
- Area code(s): 314/557
- FIPS code: 29-28630
- GNIS feature ID: 2396972
- Website: grantwoodvillage.org

Grantwood Village is a town in Gravois Township, St. Louis County, Missouri, United States. The population was 961 at the 2020 census.

== Geography ==
According to the United States Census Bureau, the village has a total area of 0.83 square miles (2.15 km^{2}), all land.

== Demographics ==
Historical population
Census	Pop.	Note	%±
1940	86		—
1950	133		54.7%
1960	676		408.3%
1970	994		47.0%
1980	1,002		0.8%
1990	904		−9.8%
2000	883		−2.3%
2010	863		−2.3%
2020	941		9.0%
U.S. Decennial Census

=== 2020 census ===
Grantwood Village town, Missouri – Racial and ethnic composition Note: the US Census treats Hispanic/Latino as an ethnic category. This table excludes Latinos from the racial categories and assigns them to a separate category. Hispanics/Latinos may be of any race.
Race / Ethnicity (NH = Non-Hispanic)	Pop 2000	Pop 2010	Pop 2020	% 2000	% 2010	% 2020
White alone (NH)	864	847	879	97.85%	98.15%	93.41%
Black or African American alone (NH)	2	5	6	0.23%	0.58%	0.64%
Native American or Alaska Native alone (NH)	0	0	0	0.00%	0.00%	0.00%
Asian alone (NH)	4	2	9	0.45%	0.23%	0.96%
Native Hawaiian or Pacific Islander alone (NH)	0	0	0	0.00%	0.00%	0.00%
Other race alone (NH)	6	0	1	0.68%	0.00%	0.11%
Mixed race or Multiracial (NH)	3	2	31	0.34%	0.23%	3.29%
Hispanic or Latino (any race)	4	7	15	0.45%	0.81%	1.59%
Total	883	863	941	100.00%	100.00%	100.00%

=== 2010 census ===
As of the census of 2010, there were 863 people, 340 households, and 262 families living in the village. The population density was 1,039.8 inhabitants per square mile (401.5/km^{2}). There were 351 housing units at an average density of 422.9 per square mile (163.3/km^{2}). The racial makeup of the village was 99.0% White, 0.6% African American, 0.2% Asian, and 0.2% from two or more races. Hispanic or Latino of any race were 0.8% of the population.

There were 340 households, of which 30.3% had children under the age of 18 living with them, 70.0% were married couples living together, 5.0% had a female householder with no husband present, 2.1% had a male householder with no wife present, and 22.9% were non-families. 19.4% of all households were made up of individuals, and 11.1% had someone living alone who was 65 years of age or older. The average household size was 2.54 and the average family size was 2.92.

The median age in the village was 50.5 years. 23.1% of residents were under the age of 18; 4.2% were between the ages of 18 and 24; 14% were from 25 to 44; 35.2% were from 45 to 64; and 23.4% were 65 years of age or older. The gender makeup of the village was 48.1% male and 51.9% female.

=== 2000 census ===
As of the census of 2000, there were 883 people, 347 households, and 284 families living in the town. The population density was 1,054.1 inhabitants per square mile (407.0/km^{2}). There were 361 housing units at an average density of 431.0 per square mile (166.4/km^{2}). The racial makeup of the town was 98.30% White, 0.23% African American, 0.45% Asian, 0.68% from other races, and 0.34% from two or more races. Hispanic or Latino of any race were 0.45% of the population.

There were 347 households, out of which 28.0% had children under the age of 18 living with them, 74.4% were married couples living together, 6.6% had a female householder with no husband present, and 17.9% were non-families. 17.3% of all households were made up of individuals, and 14.1% had someone living alone who was 65 years of age or older. The average household size was 2.54 and the average family size was 2.86.

In the town the population was spread out, with 23.0% under the age of 18, 3.3% from 18 to 24, 17.9% from 25 to 44, 26.8% from 45 to 64, and 29.0% who were 65 years of age or older. The median age was 50 years. For every 100 females, there were 91.5 males. For every 100 females age 18 and over, there were 89.4 males.

The median income for a household in the town was $91,754, and the median income for a family was $90,844. Males had a median income of $66,250 versus $35,417 for females. The per capita income for the town was $52,008. About 0.7% of families and 1.8% of the population were below the poverty line, including 2.0% of those under age 18 and 0.8% of those age 65 or over.

== Attractions ==
Grantwood Village is home to two major attractions: the Ulysses S. Grant National Historic Site (White Haven) and Grant's Farm. Most of the village, including Grant's Farm, was once part of the larger plantation owned by Mrs. Grant's family. The farm itself was purchased by August Anheuser Busch, Sr., and is the ancestral home to family members of Anheuser-Busch.

== Notable people ==
- Michael Wendl: Human Genome Project scientist
