= Affton School District =

School district in Missouri, United States

Location
- 8701 Mackenzie Road; St. Louis, Missouri 63123
- Coordinates: 38°33′17″N 90°19′26″W

District information
- Grades: K–12
- Established: 1855
- Superintendent: Travis Bracht
- Schools: Affton High School Rogers Middle School; Gotsch Intermediate School; Mesnier Primary School Affton Early Childhood

Students and staff
- Students: 2,480 As of 2010

Other information
- Website: afftonschools.net

Affton School District is a school district in Affton, Missouri, located within St. Louis County. Its schools include Affton Early Childhood, Mesnier Primary School, Gotsch Intermediate School, Merrill J. Rogers Middle School, and Affton High School.

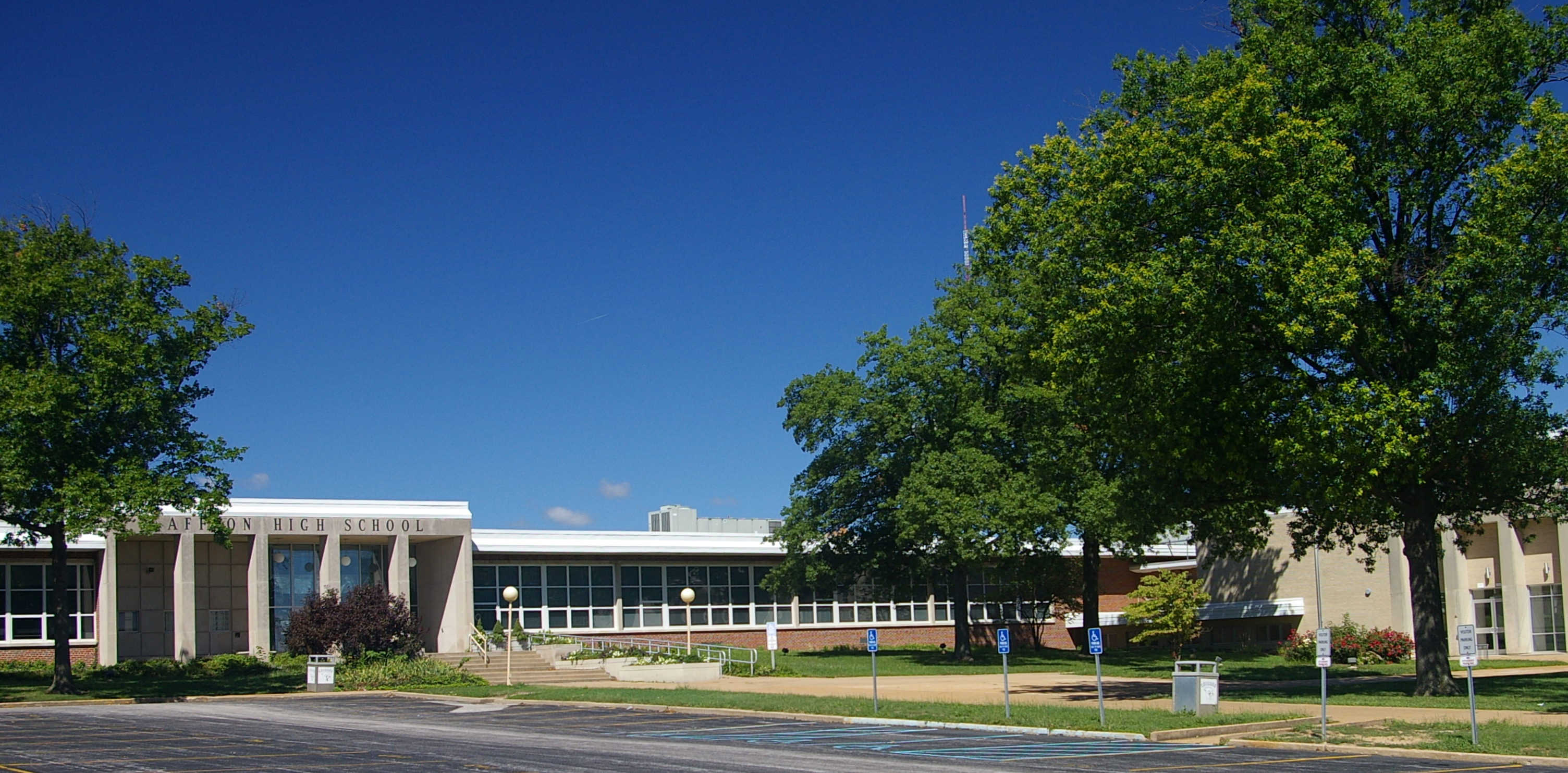
Picture of Affton High School

== History ==
The Affton School District, founded in 1855, offered its first high school courses in the basement of Mackenzie School in 1930. The first high school graduation was held in 1934. The original section of the now old Affton High School was completed in 1936. This building, located across the street from the current Affton High School, was used as the Sanders Work Activity Center, but has since been torn down and is now a senior-living facility. The current Affton High School was constructed on 22 acres (8.9 ha) of land in 1955. Several additions to the high school have added a new cafeteria, a second gym and a swimming pool, a new sports complex and a common area for student gatherings.

List of superintendents
Superintendent	Previous office	Term	Assistant Superintendent(s)
Don Francis	Assistant Principal of Unknown School	Unknown - June 10, 2010	Ken Weissflug
Ken Weissflug (Interim)	Assistant Superintendent	June 11, 2010 - June 30, 2011	
Steve Brotherton	Mesnier Primary School Principal	July 1, 2011 - June 30, 2018	Ken Weissflug Travis Bracht
Travis Bracht	Assistant Superintendent	July 1, 2018 - Present	Chris Daughtry

List of assistant superintendents
Assistant Superintendent	Previous office	Term	Superintendent(s)
Ken Weissflug		2005 - June 30, 2012	Don Francis Steve Brotherton
Travis Bracht	Merrill J. Rogers Middle School Principal	July 1, 2012 - June 30, 2018	Steve Brotherton
Chris Daughtry	Teacher	July 1, 2018 - Present	Travis Bracht

== Operations ==
Students with disabilities are referred to the Special School District of St. Louis County (SSD) facilities. Affton School District residents are zoned to Southview School (ages 5–21) in Sunset Hills.
