= Gravois Township, St. Louis County, Missouri =

Township in St. Louis County, Missouri, U.S.

Coordinates: 38°33′20″N 90°21′44″W

Gravois Township is a township in St. Louis County, in the U.S. state of Missouri. Its population was 34,919 as of the 2010 census.
