= Concord, Missouri =

- Unincorporated community Census-designated place
- Location of Concord, Missouri
- Coordinates: 38°30′14″N 90°22′39″W
- Country: United States
- State: Missouri
- County: St. Louis
- Townships: Concord, Tesson Ferry, Lemay

Area
  - Total: 5.50 sq mi (14.24 km^{2})
  - Land: 5.49 sq mi (14.23 km^{2})
  - Water: 0.0039 sq mi (0.01 km^{2})
- Elevation: 581 ft (177 m)

Population (2020)
  - Total: 17,668
  - Density: 3,214.9/sq mi (1,241.27/km^{2})
- Time zone: UTC-6 (Central (CST))
  - Summer (DST): UTC-5 (CDT)
- FIPS code: 29-16030
- GNIS feature ID: 2393386

Concord is an unincorporated community and census-designated place (CDP) in St. Louis County, Missouri, United States. The population was 17,668 at the 2020 census. It should not be confused with Concord Township, which the CDP shares much land with, but these areas' boundaries are not identical.

== Geography ==
According to the United States Census Bureau, the CDP has a total area of 5.5 square miles (14 km^{2}), all land.

Concord is mostly bounded by highways—by Interstate 255, U.S. Route 67 (locally called Lindbergh Boulevard and co-signed here with U.S. Route 50 and U.S. Route 61), Route 21 (known locally as Tesson Ferry Road), and Route 30 (known locally as Gravois Road). Interstate 270 bisects the CDP's southern node.

=== Adjacent areas ===
- Sappington CDP (west)
- Grantwood Village (north)
- Affton CDP (northeast)
- Lakeshire (northeast)
- Green Park (east)
- Mehlville CDP (east)

== Demographics ==
Historical population
Census	Pop.	Note	%±
1970	21,217		—
1980	20,896		−1.5%
1990	19,859		−5.0%
2000	16,689		−16.0%
2010	16,421		−1.6%
2020	17,668		7.6%
U.S. Decennial Census

=== Racial and ethnic composition ===
Concord CDP, Missouri – Racial and ethnic composition Note: the US Census treats Hispanic/Latino as an ethnic category. This table excludes Latinos from the racial categories and assigns them to a separate category. Hispanics/Latinos may be of any race.
Race / Ethnicity (NH = Non-Hispanic)	Pop 2000	Pop 2010	Pop 2020	% 2000	% 2010	% 2020
White alone (NH)	16,262	15,622	15,723	97.44%	95.13%	88.99%
Black or African American alone (NH)	52	103	156	0.31%	0.63%	0.88%
Native American or Alaska Native alone (NH)	13	18	18	0.08%	0.11%	0.10%
Asian alone (NH)	136	270	535	0.81%	1.64%	3.03%
Native Hawaiian or Pacific Islander alone (NH)	1	4	5	0.01%	0.02%	0.03%
Other race alone (NH)	4	7	48	0.02%	0.04%	0.27%
Mixed race or Multiracial (NH)	80	166	725	0.48%	1.01%	4.10%
Hispanic or Latino (any race)	141	231	458	0.84%	1.41%	2.59%
Total	16,689	16,421	17,668	100.00%	100.00%	100.00%

=== 2020 census ===
As of the 2020 census, Concord had a population of 17,668.

The median age was 44.8 years. 21.6% of residents were under the age of 18 and 24.1% of residents were 65 years of age or older. For every 100 females there were 92.8 males, and for every 100 females age 18 and over there were 88.8 males age 18 and over.

100.0% of residents lived in urban areas, while 0.0% lived in rural areas.

There were 7,283 households in Concord, of which 28.3% had children under the age of 18 living in them. Of all households, 54.1% were married-couple households, 14.0% were households with a male householder and no spouse or partner present, and 27.4% were households with a female householder and no spouse or partner present. About 27.3% of all households were made up of individuals and 15.3% had someone living alone who was 65 years of age or older.

There were 7,542 housing units, of which 3.4% were vacant. The homeowner vacancy rate was 0.6% and the rental vacancy rate was 6.4%.

=== 2000 census ===
As of the census of 2000, there were 16,689 people, 6,926 households, and 5,000 families living in the CDP. The population density was 3,027.0 inhabitants per square mile (1,168.7/km^{2}). There were 7,079 housing units at an average density of 1,283.9 per square mile (495.7/km^{2}). The racial makeup of the CDP was 97.95% White, 0.31% African American, 0.09% Native American, 0.83% Asian, 0.01% Pacific Islander, 0.25% from other races, and 0.57% from two or more races. Hispanic or Latino of any race were 0.84% of the population.

There were 6,926 households, out of which 25.7% had children under the age of 18 living with them, 61.6% were married couples living together, 8.2% had a female householder with no husband present, and 27.8% were non-families. 24.5% of all households were made up of individuals, and 12.1% had someone living alone who was 65 years of age or older. The average household size was 2.41 and the average family size was 2.88.

In the CDP, the population was spread out, with 20.6% under the age of 18, 6.5% from 18 to 24, 23.8% from 25 to 44, 27.9% from 45 to 64, and 21.3% who were 65 years of age or older. The median age was 44 years. For every 100 females, there were 91.5 males. For every 100 females age 18 and over, there were 88.2 males.

The median income for a household in the CDP was $55,275, and the median income for a family was $64,155. Males had a median income of $47,975 versus $31,675 for females. The per capita income for the CDP was $26,933. About 1.1% of families and 1.7% of the population were below the poverty line, including 1.8% of those under age 18 and 1.7% of those age 65 or over.

== ZIP codes ==
Most of Concord lies in the 63128 ZIP code; however, a significant northern portion is assigned to the 63123 ZIP code.

== School districts ==
Concord contains land in the Lindbergh School District in the north and the Mehlville School District in the south, although only a few schools, Mehlville's Washington Middle School and Trautwein Elementary School, are located inside Concord itself (Lindbergh's Concord Elementary is in Sappington.)

All residents of the Lindbergh district are zoned to Lindbergh High School. Residents of the Mehlville district are zoned to Mehlville High School
