= Oakville, Missouri =

- Unincorporated community Census-designated place
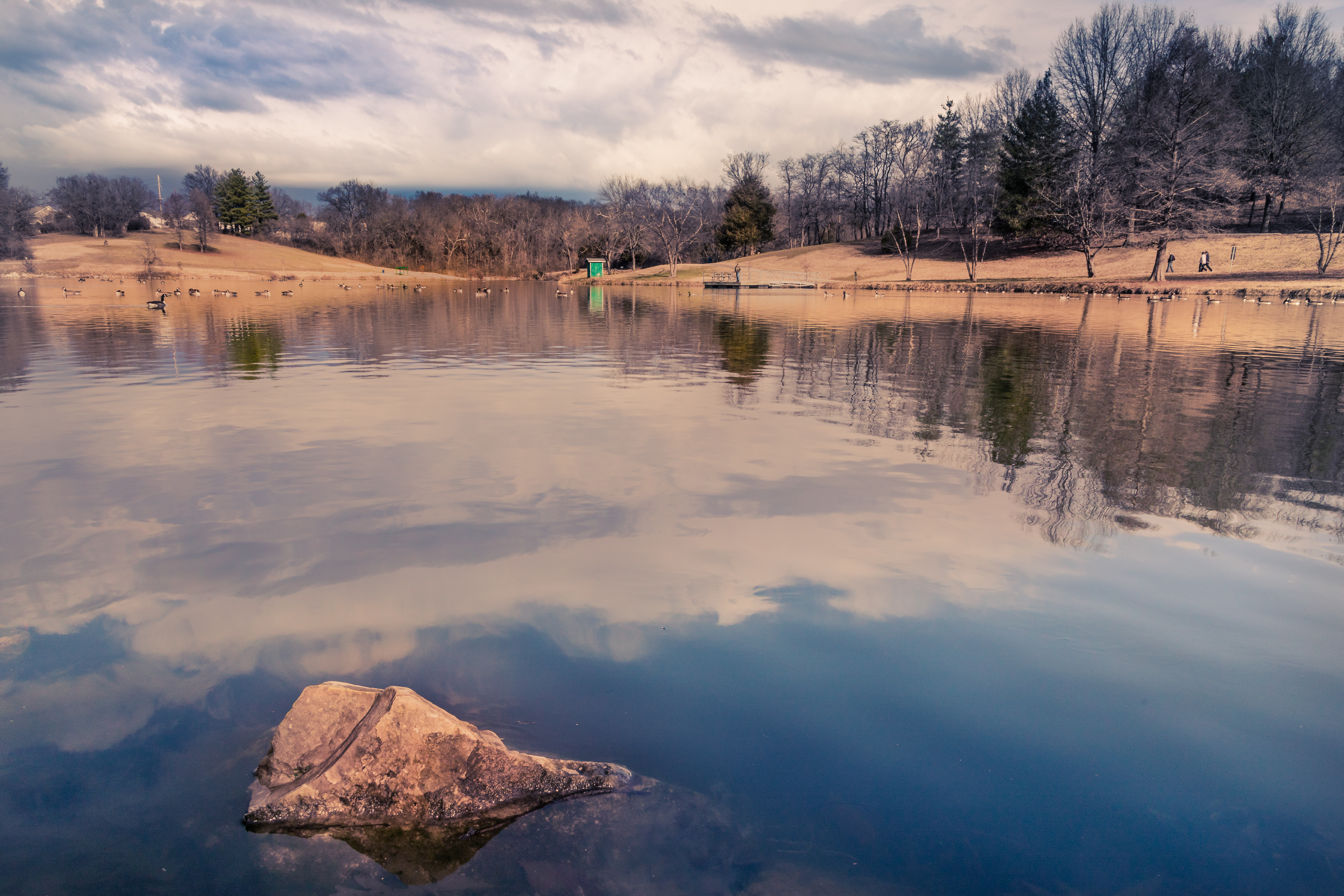
- Bee Tree County Park, Oakville, Missouri

- Location of Oakville, Missouri
- Coordinates: 38°26′52″N 90°19′12″W
- Country: United States
- State: Missouri
- County: St. Louis
- Townships: Oakville, Tesson Ferry

Area
  - Total: 17.67 sq mi (45.77 km^{2})
  - Land: 15.88 sq mi (41.12 km^{2})
  - Water: 1.80 sq mi (4.65 km^{2})
- Elevation: 564 ft (172 m)

Population (2020)
  - Total: 36,301
  - Density: 2,286.3/sq mi (882.74/km^{2})
- Time zone: UTC-6 (Central (CST))
  - Summer (DST): UTC-5 (CDT)
- ZIP code: 63129
- Area code(s): 314/557
- FIPS code: 29-53876
- GNIS feature ID: 2393166

Oakville is an unincorporated community and census-designated place (CDP) in south St. Louis County, Missouri, United States. The population was 36,301 at the 2020 census. Oakville is 18 miles south of the city of St. Louis and borders the Mississippi and Meramec rivers; the area is part of "South County" (south St. Louis County).

== Geography ==
According to the United States Census Bureau, the CDP has a total area of 30.93 square miles (80.11 km^{2}), of which 15.93 square miles (41.26 km^{2}) is land and 1.80 square miles (4.66 km^{2}) is water.

== Demographics ==
Historical population
Year	Pop.	±%
2000	35,309	—
2010	36,143	+2.4%
2020	36,301	+0.4%
Source: U.S. Decennial Census

=== Racial and ethnic composition ===
Oakville CDP, Missouri – Racial and ethnic composition Note: the US Census treats Hispanic/Latino as an ethnic category. This table excludes Latinos from the racial categories and assigns them to a separate category. Hispanics/Latinos may be of any race.
Race / Ethnicity (NH = Non-Hispanic)	Pop 2000	Pop 2010	Pop 2020	% 2000	% 2010	% 2020
White alone (NH)	34,290	34,297	32,580	97.11%	94.89%	89.75%
Black or African American alone (NH)	84	294	598	0.24%	0.81%	1.65%
Native American or Alaska Native alone (NH)	43	33	53	0.12%	0.09%	0.15%
Asian alone (NH)	324	623	711	0.92%	1.72%	1.96%
Native Hawaiian or Pacific Islander alone (NH)	2	5	7	0.01%	0.01%	0.02%
Other race alone (NH)	13	22	97	0.04%	0.06%	0.27%
Mixed race or Multiracial (NH)	188	351	1,368	0.53%	0.97%	3.77%
Hispanic or Latino (any race)	365	518	887	1.03%	1.43%	2.44%
Total	35,309	36,143	36,301	100.00%	100.00%	100.00%

=== 2020 census ===
As of the 2020 census, Oakville had a population of 36,301. The median age was 45.2 years. 20.7% of residents were under the age of 18 and 22.5% of residents were 65 years of age or older. For every 100 females there were 95.3 males, and for every 100 females age 18 and over there were 92.6 males age 18 and over.

99.8% of residents lived in urban areas, while 0.2% lived in rural areas.

There were 14,335 households in Oakville, of which 27.5% had children under the age of 18 living in them. Of all households, 61.0% were married-couple households, 12.9% were households with a male householder and no spouse or partner present, and 21.1% were households with a female householder and no spouse or partner present. About 23.1% of all households were made up of individuals and 11.9% had someone living alone who was 65 years of age or older.

There were 14,734 housing units, of which 2.7% were vacant. The homeowner vacancy rate was 0.6% and the rental vacancy rate was 5.1%.

Racial composition as of the 2020 census
Race	Number	Percent
White	32,785	90.3%
Black or African American	609	1.7%
American Indian and Alaska Native	74	0.2%
Asian	716	2.0%
Native Hawaiian and Other Pacific Islander	7	0.0%
Some other race	192	0.5%
Two or more races	1,918	5.3%
Hispanic or Latino (of any race)	887	2.4%

=== 2010 census ===
As of the census of 2010, there were 36,143 people, 13,788 households, and 10,511 families living in the CDP. The population density was 2,268.9 inhabitants per square mile (876.0/km^{2}). There were 14,314 housing units at an average density of 898.6 per square mile (347.0/km^{2}). The racial makeup of the CDP was 96.0% White, 0.8% African American, 0.1% Native American, 1.8% Asian, 0.3% from other races, and 1.0% from two or more races. Hispanic or Latino of any race were 1.4% of the population.

There were 13,788 households, of which 32.4% had children under the age of 18 living with them, 65.4% were married couples living together, 7.7% had a female householder with no husband present, 3.2% had a male householder with no wife present, and 23.8% were non-families. 19.9% of all households were made up of individuals, and 8% had someone living alone who was 65 years of age or older. The average household size was 2.61 and the average family size was 3.02.

The median age in the CDP was 43.7 years. 22.8% of residents were under the age of 18; 8% were between the ages of 18 and 24; 21.1% were from 25 to 44; 33.9% were from 45 to 64; and 14.3% were 65 years of age or older. The gender makeup of the CDP was 49.0% male and 51.0% female.

=== 2000 census ===
As of the census of 2000, there were 35,309 people, 12,530 households, and 9,923 families living in the CDP. The population density was 2,196.4 inhabitants per square mile (848.0/km^{2}). There were 12,791 housing units at an average density of 795.7 per square mile (307.2/km^{2}). The racial makeup of the CDP was 98.19% White, 0.07% African American, 0.01% Native American, 0.92% Asian, 0.02% Pacific Islander, 0.20% from other races, and 0.60% from two or more races. Hispanic or Latino of any race were 1.03% of the population.

There were 12,530 households, out of which 39.1% had children under the age of 18 living with them, 69.6% were married couples living together, 7.0% had a female householder with no husband present, and 20.8% were non-families. 17.3% of all households were made up of individuals, and 5.8% had someone living alone who was 65 years of age or older. The average household size was 2.81 and the average family size was 3.20.

In the CDP, the population was spread out, with 27.0% under the age of 18, 8.9% from 18 to 24, 26.8% from 25 to 44, 27.6% from 45 to 64, and 9.6% who were 65 years of age or older. The median age was 38 years. For every 100 females, there were 97.2 males. For every 100 females age 18 and over, there were 94.0 males.

The median income for a household in the CDP was $68,248, and the median income for a family was $76,223 (these figures had risen to $73,027 and $87,568 respectively as of a 2007 estimate). Males had a median income of $52,123 versus $33,604 for females. The per capita income for the CDP was $26,750. About 2.0% of families and 2.8% of the population were below the poverty line, including 3.3% of those under age 18 and 4.0% of those age 65 or over.

== Education ==
=== Schools ===
Oakville belongs entirely to the Mehlville School District (R-9) and the St. Louis County Special School District. Oakville High School and Mehlville High School are the two high schools in the Mehlville School District, but only Oakville High School is located in the Oakville area. Oakville Middle School is also located within the Mehlville School district. There are three Catholic grade schools in Oakville: St. Francis of Assisi, Queen of All Saints, and St. Margaret Mary Alacoque.

=== Community colleges ===
St. Louis Community College's South County Education and University Center is located off Meramec Bottom Road at Lemay Ferry Road.

=== Public libraries ===
The St. Louis County Library Cliff Cave Branch is in Oakville CDP.

== Notable people ==
- Pat Maroon - National Hockey League player
- Todd Newton - Gameshow/Podcast host
- Steve Ralston - MLS and USNT soccer player
- Bridgett Riley - boxer and kickboxer
