= Bella Villa, Missouri =

- City
- Seal

- Location of Bella Villa, Missouri
- Coordinates: 38°32′37″N 90°17′08″W
- Country: United States
- State: Missouri
- County: St. Louis
- Township: Lemay
- Incorporated: May 26, 1947

Area
  - Total: 0.13 sq mi (0.33 km^{2})
  - Land: 0.13 sq mi (0.33 km^{2})
  - Water: 0 sq mi (0.00 km^{2})
- Elevation: 456 ft (139 m)

Population (2020)
  - Total: 757
  - Density: 5,903.7/sq mi (2,279.43/km^{2})
- Time zone: UTC-6 (Central (CST))
  - Summer (DST): UTC-5 (CDT)
- ZIP code: 63125
- Area code: 314
- FIPS code: 29-04114
- GNIS feature ID: 2394110
- Website: www.cityofbellavilla-mo.org

Bella Villa is a city in Lemay Township, St. Louis County, Missouri, in the United States. As of the 2020 census, the city population was 757.

== Geography ==
According to the United States Census Bureau, the city has a total area of 0.13 square miles (0.34 km^{2}), all land.

== Demographics ==
Historical population
Census	Pop.	Note	%±
1950	557		—
1960	779		39.9%
1970	1,018		30.7%
1980	758		−25.5%
1990	708		−6.6%
2000	687		−3.0%
2010	729		6.1%
2020	757		3.8%
U.S. Decennial Census

=== 2020 census ===
Bella Villa city, Missouri – Racial and ethnic composition Note: the US Census treats Hispanic/Latino as an ethnic category. This table excludes Latinos from the racial categories and assigns them to a separate category. Hispanics/Latinos may be of any race.
Race / Ethnicity (NH = Non-Hispanic)	Pop 2000	Pop 2010	Pop 2020	% 2000	% 2010	% 2020
White alone (NH)	669	659	647	97.38%	90.40%	85.47%
Black or African American alone (NH)	1	11	15	0.15%	1.51%	1.98%
Native American or Alaska Native alone (NH)	2	2	1	0.29%	0.27%	0.13%
Asian alone (NH)	2	14	18	0.29%	1.92%	2.38%
Native Hawaiian or Pacific Islander alone (NH)	0	0	0	0.00%	0.00%	0.00%
Other race alone (NH)	0	0	1	0.00%	0.00%	0.13%
Mixed race or Multiracial (NH)	3	12	35	0.44%	1.65%	4.62%
Hispanic or Latino (any race)	10	31	40	1.46%	4.25%	5.28%
Total	687	729	757	100.00%	100.00%	100.00%

=== 2010 census ===
As of the census of 2010, there were 729 people, 333 households, and 197 families living in the city. The population density was 5,607.7 inhabitants per square mile (2,165.1/km^{2}). There were 346 housing units at an average density of 2,661.5 per square mile (1,027.6/km^{2}). The racial makeup of the city was 92.6% White, 1.5% African American, 0.3% Native American, 1.9% Asian, 1.6% from other races, and 2.1% from two or more races. Hispanic or Latino of any race were 4.3% of the population.

There were 333 households, of which 26.4% had children under the age of 18 living with them, 46.5% were married couples living together, 9.6% had a female householder with no husband present, 3.0% had a male householder with no wife present, and 40.8% were non-families. 34.5% of all households were made up of individuals, and 12.9% had someone living alone who was 65 years of age or older. The average household size was 2.19 and the average family size was 2.82.

The median age in the city was 41.8 years. 18.5% of residents were under the age of 18; 5.9% were between the ages of 18 and 24; 29.8% were from 25 to 44; 30.3% were from 45 to 64; and 15.5% were 65 years of age or older. The gender makeup of the city was 46.4% male and 53.6% female.

=== 2000 census ===
As of the census of 2000, there were 687 people, 336 households, and 185 families living in the city. The population density was 5,468.3 inhabitants per square mile (2,111.3/km^{2}). There were 351 housing units at an average density of 2,793.8 per square mile (1,078.7/km^{2}). The racial makeup of the city was 98.25% White, 0.15% African American, 0.29% Native American, 0.29% Asian, 0.29% from other races, and 0.73% from two or more races. Hispanic or Latino of any race were 1.46% of the population.

There were 336 households, out of which 17.6% had children under the age of 18 living with them, 41.7% were married couples living together, 10.7% had a female householder with no husband present, and 44.9% were non-families. 39.3% of all households were made up of individuals, and 20.8% had someone living alone who was 65 years of age or older. The average household size was 2.04 and the average family size was 2.68.

In the city, the population was spread out, with 15.4% under the age of 18, 7.3% from 18 to 24, 31.3% from 25 to 44, 24.6% from 45 to 64, and 21.4% who were 65 years of age or older. The median age was 42 years. For every 100 females, there were 89.3 males. For every 100 females age 18 and over, there were 83.3 males.

The median income for a household in the city was $36,827, and the median income for a family was $50,313. Males had a median income of $31,406 versus $28,672 for females. The per capita income for the city was $21,692. About 5.6% of families and 7.2% of the population were below the poverty line, including 7.1% of those under age 18 and 6.5% of those age 65 or over.
