= Mehlville High School =

American high school in Greater St. Louis, Missouri

Location
- 3200 Lemay Ferry Road; Mehlville, Missouri 63125; United States; 38.5126°N 90.3145°W

Information
- School type: Public comprehensive high school
- Motto: "Ensuring high levels of learning for all"
- Founded: 1925; 101 years ago
- School district: Mehlville R-9 School District
- Superintendent: Jeff Haug
- NCES School ID: 292067001115
- Principal: Roseann Bruns
- Executive headteacher: Lucian Biesiadecki
- Acting headteacher: Matthew Phoenix
- Faculty: 102.18
- Grades: 9–12
- Enrollment: 1,388 (2024–25)
- Student to teacher ratio: 13.58
- Campus type: Suburban
- Colors: Green, white, and black
- Fight song: On, Wisconsin!
- Athletics conference: Suburban Conference
- Mascot: Mehlvin the Panther
- Team name: Panthers
- Rival: Oakville Tigers Lindbergh Flyers
- Newspaper: Student Prints
- Yearbook: Reflector
- Feeder schools: Margaret Buerkle Middle School Washington Middle School
- Website: mhs.mehlvilleschooldistrict.com

Mehlville High School is a public comprehensive high school in Mehlville, Missouri, United States. It is part of the Mehlville R-9 School District.

== History ==
=== Early history (1925–1957) ===
The school and surrounding unincorporated community are both named for Charles Mehl, a German-born contractor, whose family moved into a rural area a few miles south of St. Louis, in what is today South St. Louis County. Mehl was given a land-grant in 1846 to acknowledge his service in the Mexican-American War.

Mehlville High School was first established in 1925 after parents demanded local secondary education for their children. Previously, teens in the Mehlville-Oakville area had to commute to Hancock Place or Kirkwood. The school was first housed at the old St. John's School on Will Avenue, across the street from the school's current site. Mehlville's first graduating class (Class of 1930) consisted of just two students. In 1939, the school moved across the street to a small two-story building at 3100 Lemay Ferry Road. It was rumored that the building was constructed on the site of an old gypsy camp. To handle the rapidly growing student body, the current building was built adjacent to the previous one in 1955.

Both of the old school buildings still stand. St. John's School sat dormant for many years, but it was eventually renovated and reopened as MOSAIC in 2017. The second building (now known as the Witzel Learning Center) served as a junior high school from 1955 until 1974, when Margaret Buerkle Middle School was built. After that, it housed the district's Early Childhood program. It is currently home to SCOPE, an alternative education program, and some district offices, including the IT department. The building is set to be demolished in the near future, with SCOPE and the district offices being moved elsewhere off-campus. What will replace the Witzel Learning Center currently remains unknown, but it assumed to be used simply as an open lot for the foreseeable future.

The school's original colors were maroon and gold, but they were changed in 1940 because the old color scheme looked similar to Affton High School's colors and there was concern "it would cause confusion on the court and field" Today's colors are green and white, often accented with black or grey.

=== Renovations and expansion (1957–present) ===
Since the current school building was constructed, it has been renovated on numerous occasions.

The first renovation was in 1957, when the school built a gymnasium and cafeteria.

In 1962, a second gymnasium and home economics rooms were added (Gymnasiums at the time were sex segregated; the Boy's Gymnasium was the older gym and the Girl's Gymnasium was the newer gym).

In 1970 the school built a new library media center and drama center.

Renovations in 1993 added the school's commons area, a two-story addition towards the front of the school that acts as a gathering place for students and events. The first level (the "Lower Commons") includes access to the cafeteria, library media center, and the drama center, as well as the Mehlville School District Hall of Fame. The second level (the "Upper Commons") includes a new entrance to the main gymnasium (Gym A), a trophy hall, and 12 science classrooms with labs.

The front facade of the school was rebuilt in the early 2000s

The William Nottelman auditorium, built adjacent to the school, was opened in 2013

In Early 2023, the school completed the construction of a new baseball stadium with new batting cages and bullpens, as well as renovations to the existing softball field. The old baseball facilities, which held numerous safety issues due to an exposed drain in center field and uneven terrain, was retired and currently sits abandoned, although the junior varsity football team occasionally uses the field for its practices.

Throughout the next few years, the Mehlville School District will use the money from bond measure Proposition S to renovate the school further, including security renovations, improved accessibility for individuals with disabilities, new classrooms, and renovations to the school's football/soccer stadium (including adding new restrooms)

=== Athletics and school culture ===
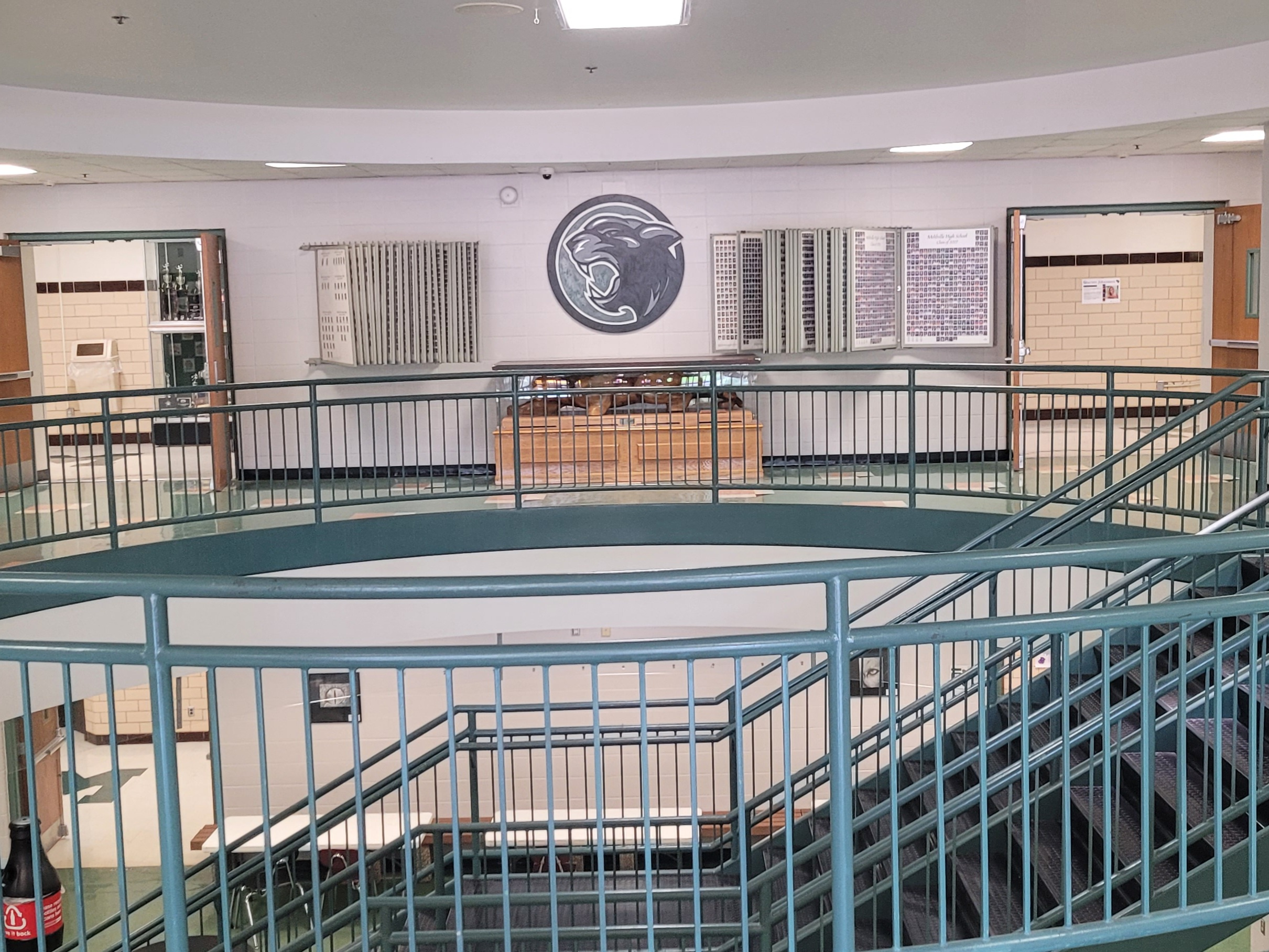
Mehlville High School's Commons, pictured in May 2022

One of the school's most notable achievements was their Class 5A football State Championship in fall 1999. The team had an 13-1 overall record. This is the school's only state championship in football, but the team has been Class 5A runner-ups twice, in 1994 and 2007. All three of these championship games were played at the Trans World/Edward Jones Dome in Downtown St. Louis.

In 2020, the school renamed their football field "Jack Jordan Stadium" in honor of Jack Jordan, who died on April 25 at the age of 79. He worked for the Mehlville School District for 33 years as a teacher, coach, counselor, and principal.

One of the many traditions for seniors at Mehlville High School is the tradition of "painting a paw print." The asphalt path that lead to Jack Jordan Stadium from the school is painted with numerous white paw prints, and at the beginning of the school year, right before football season, each senior is given one of these paw prints to design however they want.

Mehlville's mascot, an anthropomorphic black panther, is commonly seen at sporting events greeting students and cheering on the team along with the Green Pit, Mehlville's student section known for its loud and rowdy antics. In March 2022, this mascot finally got a name: "Mehlvin the Panther". It was chosen through a student poll run by the Mehlville Student Leadership group, and the name "Mehlvin," a play on words of the school's name and the English name Melvin, was the most popular and well received by the student body.

In the school's Upper Commons, there is a wooden panther statue with a time capsule embedded inside its base. The statue and time capsule were both gifted to the school by the graduating Class of 2000. The time capsule will be opened at the class's 25 year reunion in May or June 2025. After the reunion, the graduating Class of 2025 will have the honor of replacing the contents of the time capsule with new items from their time in high school, and then the capsule will be sealed for another quarter century.

== Student body ==
Mehlville has a co-educational student body of 1,440 in 2024, with a student teacher ratio of 14:1. Most students originate from Margaret Buerkle Middle School in Mehlville, with a majority of the remaining students coming from Washington Middle School in Concord. A handful of students are alumni of Bernard Middle School in North Oakville as well. The racial makeup of the school is approximately 72% White, 12% Black, 5% Asian, 5% Hispanic, and 6% mixed-race. 28.3% of the student body is considered a minority. The school graduates approximately 88% of its students every year, slightly below the Missouri state average. A notable percentage (10-20%) of the student body is of Bosnian descent.

Mehlville is a cultural melting pot, influenced heavily by immigration and foreign exchange students. Around thirty different languages are spoken by the student body at home.

== Athletics and activities ==
For the 2013–2014 school year, the school offered 26 activities approved by the Missouri State High School Activities Association (MSHSAA): baseball, boys' and girls' basketball, sideline cheerleading, boys' and girls' cross country, dance team, 11-man football, boys' and girls' golf, Marching Band, Pep Band, scholar bowl, boys' and girls' soccer, softball, speech and debate, boys' and girls' swimming and diving, boys' and girls' tennis, boys' and girls' track and field, boys' and girls' volleyball, water polo, and wrestling.

School-sponsored activities include Art Club, Book Club, Chess Club, Mehlville Media (Journalism), International Club, DECA (Distributive Education Clubs of America), Drama Club, FBLA (Future Business Leaders of America), FCCLA (Family, Career, Community Leaders of America), GSA (Gender and Sexuality Alliance), Mehlville Majorettes (who have won multiple titles at the State, Regional, and National level), National Honor Society, FCA (Fellowship of Christian Athletes), HOSA (Future Health Professionals), Key Club, Knitting Club, KOnnect, Robotics (6744 Robotics Team), National Art Honor Society, Band (Marching, Symphonic, Concert, and Jazz Band's), Panther Den, Panthers on the Go!, Science Club, Science National Honor Society, Speech and Debate, Tabletop Game Club, Student Council, Environmental Sustainability Club, E-Sports, Yearbook, and Color Guard (part of the Marching Band).

Mehlville State Championships:

- Football: 1999
- Men's volleyball: 1988
- Women's soccer: 1982
- Wrestling: 1964
- Men's water polo: 1979, 1980

The school has also produced one girls' swimming and diving individual state champion, two boys' track and field individual state champions, and one boys' track and field relay state champion.

== Notable alumni ==
- Shawn Krause, animator of Pixar Animation Studios
- Dave Loos, retired college basketball coach, most successful coach in Ohio Valley Conference history
- Keon Raymond, former CFL player for the Calgary Stampeders
- Rick tha Rular, comedy hip hop artist
- Mike Trapasso, head coach for UT Arlington Mavericks baseball
- Melvin Williams, former NFL player
