= Mehlville, Missouri =

- Unincorporated community Census-designated place
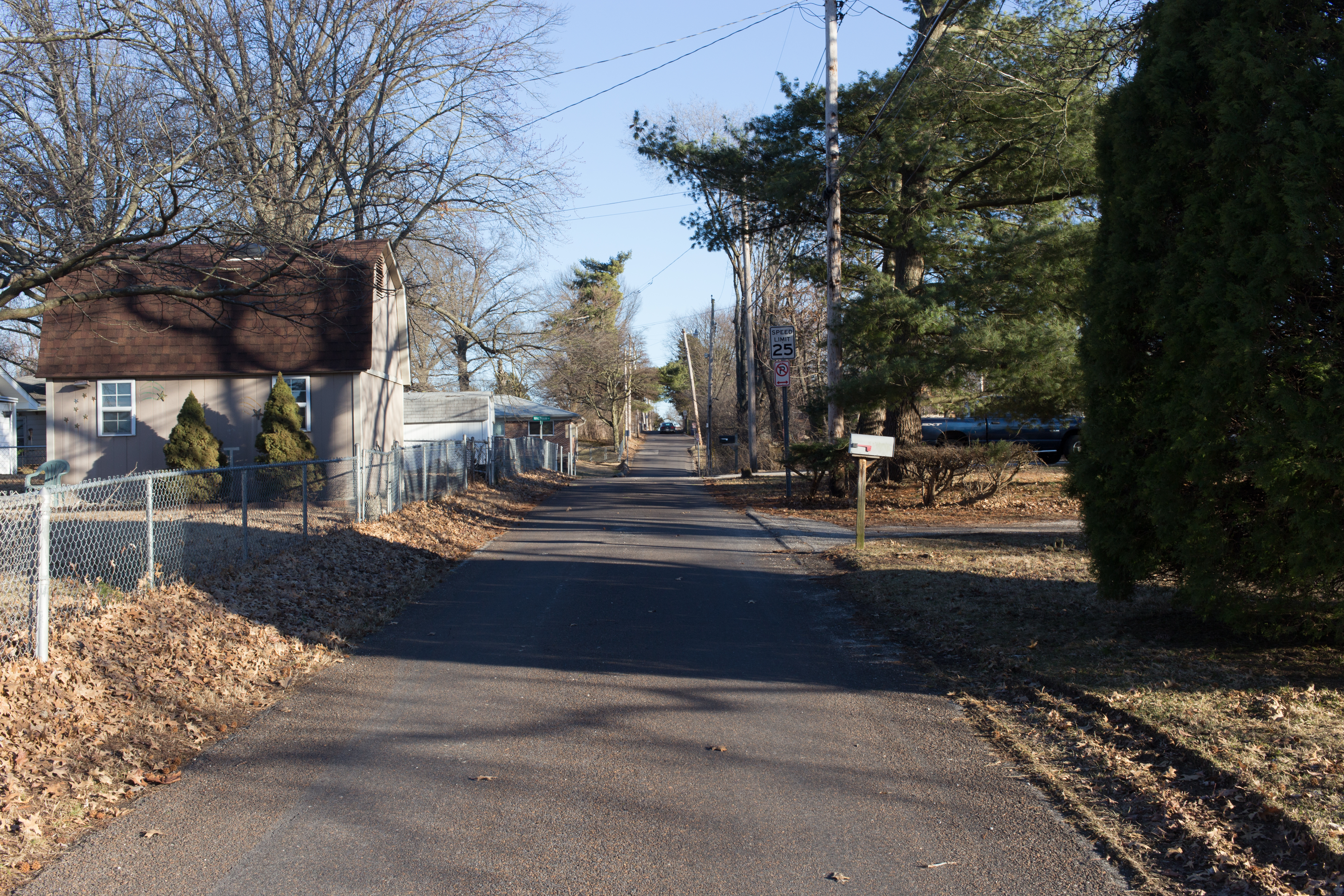
- Jeffersonian Lane, Mehlville, Missouri, February 2019

- Location of Mehlville, Missouri
- Coordinates: 38°30′07″N 90°18′54″W
- Country: United States
- State: Missouri
- County: St. Louis
- Townships: Lemay, Tesson Ferry, Oakville

Area
  - Total: 7.63 sq mi (19.76 km^{2})
  - Land: 7.48 sq mi (19.37 km^{2})
  - Water: 0.15 sq mi (0.40 km^{2})
- Elevation: 597 ft (182 m)

Population (2020)
  - Total: 28,955
  - Density: 3,872.6/sq mi (1,495.22/km^{2})
- Time zone: UTC-6 (Central (CST))
  - Summer (DST): UTC-5 (CDT)
- ZIP codes: 63125, 63128, 63129
- Area code(s): 314/557
- FIPS code: 29-47180
- GNIS feature ID: 2393123

Mehlville is an unincorporated community and census-designated place (CDP) in south St. Louis County, Missouri, United States, an area locally known as "South County". It is an inner-ring suburb of St. Louis, and part of the Greater St. Louis metropolitan area.

== Geography ==
According to the United States Census Bureau, the CDP has a total area of 7.6 square miles (20 km^{2}), of which 7.4 square miles (19 km^{2}) is land and 0.2 square miles (0.52 km^{2}), or 2.77%, is water.

== Demographics ==
Historical population
Year	Pop.	±%
1990	27,557	—
2000	28,822	+4.6%
2010	28,380	−1.5%
2020	28,955	+2.0%
Source: U.S. Decennial Census

=== Racial and ethnic composition ===
Mehlville CDP, Missouri – Racial and ethnic composition Note: the US Census treats Hispanic/Latino as an ethnic category. This table excludes Latinos from the racial categories and assigns them to a separate category. Hispanics/Latinos may be of any race.
Race / Ethnicity (NH = Non-Hispanic)	Pop 2000	Pop 2010	Pop 2020	% 2000	% 2010	% 2020
White alone (NH)	27,056	25,674	24,199	93.87%	90.47%	83.57%
Black or African American alone (NH)	503	845	1,313	1.75%	2.98%	4.53%
Native American or Alaska Native alone (NH)	35	34	32	0.12%	0.12%	0.11%
Asian alone (NH)	501	581	915	1.74%	2.05%	3.16%
Native Hawaiian or Pacific Islander alone (NH)	3	11	5	0.01%	0.04%	0.02%
Other race alone (NH)	20	17	95	0.07%	0.06%	0.33%
Mixed race or Multiracial (NH)	287	393	1,366	1.00%	1.38%	4.72%
Hispanic or Latino (any race)	417	825	1,030	1.45%	2.91%	3.56%
Total	28,822	28,380	28,955	100.00%	100.00%	100.00%

=== 2020 census ===
As of the 2020 census, Mehlville had a population of 28,955. The median age was 42.6 years. 17.8% of residents were under the age of 18 and 21.7% of residents were 65 years of age or older. For every 100 females there were 91.3 males, and for every 100 females age 18 and over there were 87.9 males age 18 and over.

100.0% of residents lived in urban areas, while 0.0% lived in rural areas.

There were 13,271 households in Mehlville, of which 22.4% had children under the age of 18 living in them. Of all households, 39.9% were married-couple households, 20.6% were households with a male householder and no spouse or partner present, and 32.5% were households with a female householder and no spouse or partner present. About 37.1% of all households were made up of individuals and 16.0% had someone living alone who was 65 years of age or older.

There were 13,854 housing units, of which 4.2% were vacant. The homeowner vacancy rate was 0.9% and the rental vacancy rate was 5.3%.

Racial composition as of the 2020 census
Race	Number	Percent
White	24,439	84.4%
Black or African American	1,327	4.6%
American Indian and Alaska Native	59	0.2%
Asian	918	3.2%
Native Hawaiian and Other Pacific Islander	5	0.0%
Some other race	359	1.2%
Two or more races	1,848	6.4%
Hispanic or Latino (of any race)	1,030	3.6%

=== 2000 census ===
At the 2000 census there were 28,822 people, 12,541 households, and 7,775 families living in the CDP. The population density was 3,913.6 inhabitants per square mile (1,511.0/km^{2}). There were 12,982 housing units at an average density of 1,762.8 per square mile (680.6/km^{2}). The racial makeup of the CDP was 97.08% White, 0.75% African American, 0.13% Native American, 1.77% Asian, 0.02% Pacific Islander, 0.34% from other races, and 0.61% from two or more races. Hispanic or Latino of any race were 1.45%.

There were 12,541 households, 25.9% had children under the age of 18 living with them, 48.6% were married couples living together, 10.2% had a female householder with no husband present, and 38.0% were non-families. 32.5% of households were one person and 12.7% were one person aged 65 or older. The average household size was 2.27 and the average family size was 2.90.

The age distribution was 21.2% under the age of 18, 9.4% from 18 to 24, 28.3% from 25 to 44, 23.1% from 45 to 64, and 18.0% 65 or older. The median age was 39 years. For every 100 females, there were 89.2 males. For every 100 females age 18 and over, there were 84.9 males.

The median household income was $43,734 and the median family income was $55,202. Males had a median income of $41,435 versus $27,551 for females. The per capita income for the CDP was $23,125. About 3.7% of families and 5.6% of the population were below the poverty line, including 6.6% of those under age 18 and 5.4% of those age 65 or over.

== School districts ==
The school district for Mehlville is the Mehlville School District (R-9), which consists of one early childhood preschool program, ten elementary schools, four middle schools, and two high schools, Mehlville High School and Oakville High School. The Mehlville School District has approximately 12,000 students currently enrolled. Only Mehlville High School is in the Mehlville area, located on Lemay Ferry Road.

== Notable people ==
Shawn Krause, animator of Pixar Animation Studios.
