= Green Park, Missouri =

- City
- Seal

- Location of Green Park, Missouri
- Coordinates: 38°31′27″N 90°20′12″W
- Country: United States
- State: Missouri
- County: St. Louis
- Township: Concord

Area
  - Total: 1.32 sq mi (3.41 km^{2})
  - Land: 1.31 sq mi (3.39 km^{2})
  - Water: 0.0077 sq mi (0.02 km^{2})
- Elevation: 535 ft (163 m)

Population (2020)
  - Total: 2,705
  - Density: 2,066.6/sq mi (797.91/km^{2})
- Time zone: UTC-6 (Central (CST))
  - Summer (DST): UTC-5 (CDT)
- ZIP code: 63123
- Area code: 314
- FIPS code: 29-29324
- GNIS feature ID: 2394977
- Website: www.cityofgreenpark.com

Green Park is a city in Concord Township, St. Louis County, Missouri, United States. The population was 2,705 at the 2020 census.

== Geography ==
According to the United States Census Bureau, the city has a total area of 1.35 square miles (3.50 km^{2}), all land.

== Demographics ==
Historical population
Census	Pop.	Note	%±
2000	2,666		—
2010	2,622		−1.7%
2020	2,705		3.2%
U.S. Decennial Census

=== Racial and ethnic composition ===
Green Park city, Missouri – Racial and ethnic composition Note: the US Census treats Hispanic/Latino as an ethnic category. This table excludes Latinos from the racial categories and assigns them to a separate category. Hispanics/Latinos may be of any race.
Race / Ethnicity (NH = Non-Hispanic)	Pop 2000	Pop 2010	Pop 2020	% 2000	% 2010	% 2020
White alone (NH)	2,594	2,395	2,341	97.30%	91.34%	86.54%
Black or African American alone (NH)	0	36	46	0.00%	1.37%	1.70%
Native American or Alaska Native alone (NH)	1	1	4	0.04%	0.04%	0.15%
Asian alone (NH)	22	89	120	0.83%	3.39%	4.44%
Native Hawaiian or Pacific Islander alone (NH)	1	1	0	0.04%	0.04%	0.00%
Other race alone (NH)	0	0	8	0.00%	0.00%	0.30%
Mixed race or Multiracial (NH)	16	56	84	0.60%	2.14%	3.11%
Hispanic or Latino (any race)	32	44	102	1.20%	1.68%	3.77%
Total	2,666	2,622	2,705	100.00%	100.00%	100.00%

=== 2020 census ===
As of the 2020 census, Green Park had a population of 2,705. The median age was 46.4 years. 18.5% of residents were under the age of 18 and 25.1% of residents were 65 years of age or older. For every 100 females there were 93.4 males, and for every 100 females age 18 and over there were 90.1 males age 18 and over.

100.0% of residents lived in urban areas, while 0.0% lived in rural areas.

There were 1,043 households in Green Park, of which 28.4% had children under the age of 18 living in them. Of all households, 50.8% were married-couple households, 14.1% were households with a male householder and no spouse or partner present, and 29.0% were households with a female householder and no spouse or partner present. About 27.6% of all households were made up of individuals and 16.2% had someone living alone who was 65 years of age or older.

There were 1,086 housing units, of which 4.0% were vacant. The homeowner vacancy rate was 0.7% and the rental vacancy rate was 6.7%.

=== 2010 census ===
As of the 2010 census, there were 2,622 people, 1,001 households, and 730 families living in the city. The population density was 1,942.2 inhabitants per square mile (749.9/km^{2}). There were 1,034 housing units at an average density of 765.9 per square mile (295.7/km^{2}). The racial makeup of the city was 92.5% White, 1.4% African American, 3.5% Asian, 0.1% Pacific Islander, 0.3% from other races, and 2.3% from two or more races. Hispanic or Latino of any race were 1.7% of the population.

There were 1,001 households, of which 29.4% had children under the age of 18 living with them, 58.0% were married couples living together, 10.0% had a female householder with no husband present, 4.9% had a male householder with no wife present, and 27.1% were non-families. 23.8% of all households were made up of individuals, and 10.9% had someone living alone who was 65 years of age or older. The average household size was 2.48 and the average family size was 2.92.

The median age in the city was 45.1 years. 20.3% of residents were under the age of 18; 6.3% were between the ages of 18 and 24; 23.3% were from 25 to 44; 28.2% were from 45 to 64; and 21.8% were 65 years of age or older. The gender makeup of the city was 47.3% male and 52.7% female.

=== 2000 census ===
As of the 2000 census, there were 2,666 people, 961 households, and 720 families living in the city. The population density was 1,909.0 inhabitants per square mile (737.1/km^{2}). There were 985 housing units at an average density of 705.3 per square mile (272.3/km^{2}). The racial makeup of the city was 97.86% White, 0.04% Native American, 0.83% Asian, 0.08% Pacific Islander, 0.53% from other races, and 0.68% from two or more races. Hispanic or Latino of any race were 1.20% of the population.

There were 961 households, out of which 31.3% had children under the age of 18 living with them, 61.8% were married couples living together, 9.6% had a female householder with no husband present, and 25.0% were non-families. 21.4% of all households were made up of individuals, and 10.0% had someone living alone who was 65 years of age or older. The average household size was 2.54 and the average family size was 2.95.

In the city, the population was spread out, with 21.3% under the age of 18, 6.6% from 18 to 24, 26.3% from 25 to 44, 22.8% from 45 to 64, and 23.0% who were 65 years of age or older. The median age was 42 years. For every 100 females, there were 84.6 males. For every 100 females age 18 and over, there were 79.2 males.

The median income for a household in the city was $49,069, and the median income for a family was $55,431. Males had a median income of $43,021 versus $29,934 for females. The per capita income for the city was $20,414. 3.1% of the population and 0.7% of families were below the poverty line. Out of the total population, none under the age of 18 and 10.3% of those 65 and older were living below the poverty line.

== Education ==
- St. Louis County Library operated the Tesson-Ferry Branch in Green Park. The Tesson-Ferry branch was closed in 2015 and subsequently demolished.
- Green Park is located within the Mehlville School District and Lindbergh School District.
