= Shawn Krause (animator) =

American animator

- Born: Mehlville, St. Louis County, Missouri, United States
- Education: Margaret Buerkle Middle School (1980–1983 (Note: The school's age range from age 11 to 14.)); Mehlville High School (1983–1987 (Note: The school's age range from age 14 to 18.)); University of Missouri (1987–1992) (BFA); California Institute of the Arts (1993–1994)
- Occupation: Animator
- Years active: 1994–present
- Employer(s): Creative Capers Entertainment (1994); Pixar Animation Studios (1994–2020, 2023–present); Spire Animation Studios (2020–2023)
- Organization: Academy of Motion Picture Arts and Sciences (2016–present)
- Known for: Up; Cars 2 Inside Out
- Children: 2
- Relatives: Audrey Kissel (maternal aunt)
- Awards: VES Awards (2016); Kidscreen Awards (2021); Mehlville School District Alumni Hall of Fame (2023)

Shawn Krause is an American animator for Pixar Animation Studios and previously a Creative Director of Animation and Story at Spire Animation Studios.

== Early life and education ==
Shawn Krause was born in Mehlville, St. Louis County, Missouri, as a middle and a second child, as well the second son of Ronald "Ron" Krause and Jacqueline Laverne "Jackie" Krause (née Kissel). Ron was a previous and the second-generation manager of Krause Key & Lock, a prominent key store and locksmith service in St. Louis, that has been established in 1947 by Shawn's paternal grandfather as well the store’s first-generation manager, William "Bill" Krause. The store itself also made its appearance during one of the montages in the end credits of Inside Out, a film in which Shawn worked as one of the supervising animators. He had an older brother, Eric Krause, who is a current and the third-generation manager of the said store, and a younger sister, Candace "Candy" Gehricke (née Krause), who worked as an art teacher in St. Charles, and also an alumna and a former member of a Gamma Phi Beta (ΓΦΒ) sorority of University of Missouri, the same college in which Shawn himself was one of its alumni. His maternal aunt, Audrey Susan Lafser (née Kissel), who was known as Audrey Kissel with her nicknames such as “Pigtails” and “Kiss” was a baseball player who participated as an infielder for Minneapolis Millerettes team in the 1944 season of All-American Girls Professional Baseball League. One of his cousins, Hillary Smith, is a cellist who performed cello for reality shows such as, The Tonight Show Starring Jimmy Fallon, The Today Show, America's Got Talent, and The Ellen DeGeneres Show.

He became interested in animation since his mother took him to watched the re-release of a Disney animated feature, Pinocchio and he also spent his childhood making flip books especially during his elementary school days in the fifth-grade. His influences including Disney veteran animators, Frank Thomas and Ollie Johnston, in which he owned and read the famous book they have created, The Illusion of Life and he also watched the both said animators when they appeared as guest stars at one of the episodes of The Tonight Show Starring Johnny Carson, a show he used to watch and he was also influenced by the works of Bud Luckey (who later worked with him at Pixar) that were shown as segments in many episodes of Sesame Street. He also used to watch classic movies on TV, as well other reality shows like The Mary Tyler Moore Show, as well the compilations of animated shorts by Warner Bros. Cartoons, such as Looney Tunes with his father who was also being a fan of shorts featuring Bugs Bunny via The Bugs Bunny Show.

As a native of Mehlville and also grew up there, he attended the schools of Mehlville School District that was located in his birthplace, such as Margaret Buerkle Middle School and Mehlville High School. After he graduated from the said high school in 1987, he attended the University of Missouri in Columbia, Missouri and graduated with Bachelor's Degree of Fine Art with a Minor in Art History and Archaeology in 1992. A year later, with the help of his paternal grandmother, Lucille Elizabeth "Lucy" Krause (née Watson), who was an artist who have tutored him on drawing, he was sent to attended California Institute of the Arts in Valencia, Santa Clarita, California, where among his teachers including a veteran animator, Larry White, who showed him some of early animated short films made by Pixar such as, The Adventures of André & Wally B., and Luxo Jr., he described this event as a “lightning bolt” that made him become interest in computer animation.

Besides him, his teacher in character design, is a prominent Disney veteran artist, Susan Carol Maciorowski (née Nichols), or known as Sue C. Nichols and he also attended the first story class of Joe Ranft, who later worked with him at Pixar. Some of his classmates were later become fellow animators who also worked at Pixar with him including Ricky Nierva, Sanjay Patel, Mark Walsh, Stephen Gregory, Tasha Wedeen, and Bobby Podesta, also a non-Pixar-related professional character designer, Joe Moshier. He created one of his student films, The Bicycle Thieves, his first year short film that caught the attention of Pete Docter, and it also made it into CalArts Producer's Show. During his second semester, his sessions at that college were temporarily halted due to the 1994 Northridge earthquake. At this time, he never earned a degree of this college due to never finished all the semesters, in which according to one of his interviews, he expressed regret.

== Career ==
After he dropped out from the college in 1994, he started his animation career when he was hired at Creative Capers Entertainment in Altadena, California, where he briefly worked on CD-ROM games based on Disney films, which he was credited for help doing clean up on animations on a Disney's Animated Storybook game based on The Lion King and a Disney's Activity Center game based on Aladdin that were both released in the same year. He later got contacted by Pixar, in which he was later started worked at the studio itself in October 1994 after being hired by Darla K. Anderson, while it was still a small division in hiatus under 100 employees. (Note: according to his foreword in Disney Pixar's Toy Story Manga: 30th Anniversary Edition.) He started worked there on commercials such as storyboarded Chips Ahoy! commercials. Later, Darla offered his role to directed commercials in which he co-directed a Twizzlers commercial (with Jan Pinkava as a director), and directed a commercial of Levi's.

After worked at commercials, he alongside fellow animator Bob Peterson who also had previously storyboarded Chips Ahoy! commercials with him got an offer from the studio itself in which both eventually started worked on the studio's first feature, Toy Story, in which eventually became Shawn's first credited work at the studio as an animator. During the production of the said film, he was invited to the storyboards of what were became a sequence of Green Army Men with one completed animated scene. (Note: according to his foreword in Disney Pixar's Toy Story Manga: 30th Anniversary Edition.) During his first days as one of the animators of the film, his fellow animator, Rex Grignon examined his animation skills through first shots that Shawn animated in daily and eventually approved all of the shots he animated. As the film was finished, he along with the entire studio crew led by Ed Catmull, Steve Jobs, and John Lasseter, attended the earliest test screening of the film in Alhambra Theatre in San Francisco. (Note: according to his foreword in Disney Pixar's Toy Story Manga: 30th Anniversary Edition.) Afterwards, he worked on numerous Pixar projects including feature films, short films, and some of their franchise’s related theme park attractions which he went through learned different kinds of animations. In November 2001, he along with entire staff of Pixar followed Pixar's headquarters being moved from Point Richmond, in California to Emeryville, also in the same state.

His contributions including led the animation teams for three Pixar features such as, Up, Cars 2 and Inside Out. As one of supervising animators of Inside Out, he won on 14th VES Awards in a category of Outstanding Animated Performance in an Animated Feature for animating the feature's main character, Joy. In 2016, he became a member of Academy of Motion Picture Arts and Sciences. In Cars 2, his own car version as well his in-universe counterpart car version (modeled after the real-life 1967 Alfa Romeo Spider 1600 "Duetto" car) existed in purpose to honored his role as one of the film’s supervising animators with the name "Shawn Krash", who briefly appeared as one of the film’s background characters, and his name confirmed on his own die-cast licensed by Mattel, in which all the names of die-cast toys of some of background characters of its franchise were decided by the franchise's creative director, Jay Ward. In August 2020, he left Pixar to Spire Animation Studios where he once hold the title of Creative Director of Animation and Story, and eventually returned to his previous workplace in May 2023. Aside from his career at Pixar, he also experienced volunteership in Verde Valley School in Sedona, Arizona, where he has been a guest instructor since June 2013, in which he led a week-long filmmaking class for select student’s end-of-year called "Project Period" and became a member of Board of Trustees in January 2017.

In 2023, he was awarded as one of inductees of Mehlville School District Alumni Hall of Fame.

As of today, he currently resided in San Francisco Bay Area, California.

== Works ==
=== Filmography ===
==== Commercials ====
- Balloon (brand : Chips Ahoy!) (1995) : storyboard artist (uncredited)
- Circus (brand : Chips Ahoy!) (1995) : storyboard artist (uncredited)
- Christmas Conga (brand : Tower Records) (1995) : director (uncredited)
- Let Me In (brand : Twizzlers) (1996) : co-director (uncredited)
- Shake It (brand : Levi’s) (1996) : director (uncredited)

==== Feature films ====
- Toy Story (1995) : Animation (additional animation (as "Shawn P. Krause")), Layout (additional layout (as "Shawn P. Krause"))
- A Bug's Life (1998) : Animation (animator)
- Toy Story 2 (1999) : Animation (animator)
- Monsters, Inc. (2001) : Animation (character development (Roz, as "Shawn P. Krause"), animator (as "Shawn P. Krause"))
- Finding Nemo (2003) : Animation (animator (as “Shawn P. Krause”)), character development (Bloat, uncredited)
- The Incredibles (2004) : Animation (animator)
- Cars (2006) : Animation (animator)
- Ratatouille (2007) : Thanks To Everyone At Pixar Who Supported This Production (pixar productions)
- Up (2009) : Animation (directing animator)
- Cars 2 (2011) : Supervising Animator
- Brave (2012) : Animation (additional animator)
- Inside Out (2015) : Supervising Animator (Joy)
- The Good Dinosaur (2015) : Animation (animator)
- Finding Dory (2016) : Animation (animator)
- Cars 3 (2017) : Animation (animator)
- Incredibles 2 (2018) : Animation (character development & animation)
- Toy Story 4 (2019) : Pixar Studio Team (custom animation production)
- Soul (2020) : Animation (additional animation)
- Inside Out 2 (2024) : Animation (animator)
- Elio (2025) : Animation (animator)
- Hoppers (2026) : Animation (character development & animation)
- Toy Story 5 (2026) : Animation (animator)

==== Short films ====
- The Bicycle Thieves (Note: A student film he created during he attended California Institute of the Arts.) (1994) : a film by
- Jack-Jack Attack (2005) : animator
- Riley's First Date? (2015) : supervising animator
- Bao (2018) : additional visual development
- Lamp Life (2020) : supervising animator
- Pixar Popcorn (2021) :
  - Soul of the City (2021) : animation & story by
  - Dancing with the Cars (2021) : animation & story by
- Fruit & Nut (2026) : animation

==== Series ====
- Dug Days (2021) :
  - Puppies (2021) : animator
- Dream Productions (2024) :
  - Part 1: The Dream Team (2024) : Animation (additional animation)
  - Part 2: Out of Body (2024) : Animation (additional animation)
  - Part 3: Romance! (2024) : Animation (additional animation)
  - Part 4: A Night to Remember (2024) : Animation (additional animation)

==== Documentaries ====
- A Day in the Life of John Lasseter (2011) : himself (as "Cars 2 Supervising Animator")

=== Video games ===
- Disney’s Animated Storybook (1994) :
  - The Lion King (Windows, Macintosh) (1994) : Creative Capers Entertainment, Inc. (animator)
- Disney’s Activity Center (1994) :
  - Aladdin (Windows, Macintosh) (1994) : animation clean-up
- Cars Race-O-Rama (PlayStation 2, PlayStation 3, Xbox 360, Wii, Nintendo DS, PlayStation Portable) (2009) : Pixar Animation Studios (special thanks)
- Cars 2: The Video Game (PlayStation 3, Xbox 360, Windows, Wii, Nintendo DS, Nintendo 3DS, PlayStation Portable, OS X, iOS) (2011) : Pixar Animation Studios (supervising animator)

=== Theme parks ===
- It's Tough to Be a Bug! (Disney's Animal Kingdom, Disney California Adventure) (1998-2025) : directing animator (uncredited)
- The Seas with Nemo & Friends (Epcot) (2007) : supervising animator (uncredited)
- Finding Nemo Submarine Voyage (Disneyland) (2007) : supervising animator (uncredited), statue poser (Darla statue, uncredited)

=== Bibliography ===
- The Art of Cars 2 (2011) : commentary
- Disney Pixar's Toy Story Manga: 30th Anniversary Edition (2025) : foreword
