= Melvin Williams (American football) =

American football player (born 1979)

No. 96, 71
- Position: Defensive end

Personal information
- Born: February 2, 1979 (age 47); St. Louis, Missouri, U.S.
- Listed height: 6 ft 2 in (1.88 m)
- Listed weight: 269 lb (122 kg)

Career information
- High school: Mehlville (Mehlville, Missouri)
- College: Kansas State (1998–2002)
- NFL draft: 2003: 5th round, 155th overall pick

Career history
- New Orleans Saints (2003–2004); San Francisco 49ers (2004); Miami Dolphins (2004); Washington Redskins (2004–2005); New Orleans VooDoo (2007)

Awards and highlights
- Third-team All-Big 12 (2002)

Career NFL statistics
- Tackles: 16
- Fumble recoveries: 1
- Passes defended: 4
- Stats at Pro Football Reference
- Stats at ArenaFan.com

Melvin Williams (born February 2, 1979) is an American former professional football player who was a defensive end for two seasons in the National Football League (NFL) with the New Orleans Saints and San Francisco 49ers. He was selected by the Saints in the fifth round of the 2003 NFL draft after playing college football for the Kansas State Wildcats. Williams was also a member of the Miami Dolphins, Washington Redskins and New Orleans VooDoo.

== Early life ==
Melvin Williams was born on February 2, 1979, in St. Louis, Missouri. He was a three-year letterman in both football and basketball at Mehlville High School in Mehlville, Missouri. As a junior in 1995, he recorded 68 solo tackles, 48 assisted tackles, and 11 sacks on defense while also catching nine touchdown passes as a tight end on offense. As a senior in 1996, Williams totaled 78 solo tackles, 16 sacks, five forced fumbles, three fumble recoveries, three interceptions, and 18 receptions for 400 yards and eight touchdowns. He earned first-team all-state honors his senior year. He averaged 19.2 points per game and 10.8 rebounds per game his junior season in basketball. He finished his basketball career as the school's all-time leading scorer.

== College career ==
Williams originally signed to play college football for the Kansas State Wildcats of Kansas State University in 1997 but did not enroll until spring 1998. He was redshirted in 1998, and was a four-year letterman from 1999 to 2002. He earned Associated Press third-team All-Big 12 honors his senior year in 2002.

== Professional career ==
Williams was selected by the New Orleans Saints in the fifth round, with the 155th overall pick, of the 2003 NFL draft. He signed with the Saints on June 16, 2003. He played in 14 games, starting two, for the Saints during his rookie year in 2003, recording six solo tackles, six assisted tackles, and one pass breakup. Williams was waived on October 4, 2004.

Williams was claimed off waivers by the San Francisco 49ers on October 5, 2004. He was waived on October 19, re-signed on November 3, and waived again on November 13, 2004. Overall, he played in three games for the 49ers during the 2004 season, totaling three solo tackles, one assisted tackle, and three pass breakups.

Williams was claimed off waivers by the Miami Dolphins on November 15, 2004. He was soon released on November 23, 2004, before appearing in any games.

Williams signed with the Washington Redskins on December 29, 2004, but was released two days later. He re-signed with the Redskins on January 3, 2005. He was placed on injured reserve on August 18, 2005, and spent the entire season there. Williams became a free agent after the 2005 season.

Williams was signed by the New Orleans VooDoo of the Arena Football League on January 9, 2007. He was placed on injured reserve on February 16. He was activated on March 30, 2007. Williams played in nine games for the VooDoo during the 2007 season, recording five solo tackles, one assisted tackle, one forced fumble, three fumble recoveries, and one blocked kick.

== Personal life ==
Williams' brother, Turelle, also played football at Kansas State.
