= Lakeshire, Missouri =

- City
- Motto: "The Beautiful City of Lakeshire"
- Location of Lakeshire, Missouri
- Coordinates: 38°32′24″N 90°20′18″W
- Country: United States
- State: Missouri
- County: St. Louis
- Township: Concord

Government
  - Type: Mayor-council city

Area
  - Total: 0.22 sq mi (0.58 km^{2})
  - Land: 0.22 sq mi (0.58 km^{2})
  - Water: 0 sq mi (0.00 km^{2})
- Elevation: 532 ft (162 m)

Population (2020)
  - Total: 1,554
  - Density: 6,937.7/sq mi (2,678.66/km^{2})
- Time zone: UTC-6 (Central (CST))
  - Summer (DST): UTC-5 (CDT)
- ZIP code: 63123
- Area code: 314
- FIPS code: 29-40088
- GNIS feature ID: 2395611
- Website: lakeshiremo.gov

Lakeshire is a city in Concord Township, St. Louis County, Missouri, Missouri, United States. The population was 1,554 at the 2020 census.

== Geography ==
According to the United States Census Bureau, the city has a total area of 0.21 square miles (0.54 km^{2}), all land.

== Demographics ==
Historical population
| Census | Pop. | Note | %± |
|---|---|---|---|
| 1950 | 295 | | — |
| 1960 | 487 | | 65.1% |
| 1970 | 1,186 | | 143.5% |
| 1980 | 1,593 | | 34.3% |
| 1990 | 1,467 | | −7.9% |
| 2000 | 1,375 | | −6.3% |
| 2010 | 1,432 | | 4.1% |
| 2020 | 1,554 | | 8.5% |
U.S. Decennial Census

=== Racial and ethnic composition ===
Lakeshire city, Missouri – Racial and ethnic composition Note: the US Census treats Hispanic/Latino as an ethnic category. This table excludes Latinos from the racial categories and assigns them to a separate category. Hispanics/Latinos may be of any race.
| Race / Ethnicity (NH = Non-Hispanic) | Pop 2000 | Pop 2010 | Pop 2020 | % 2000 | % 2010 | % 2020 |
|---|---|---|---|---|---|---|
| White alone (NH) | 1,338 | 1,314 | 1,340 | 97.31% | 91.76% | 86.23% |
| Black or African American alone (NH) | 5 | 41 | 52 | 0.36% | 2.86% | 3.35% |
| Native American or Alaska Native alone (NH) | 1 | 3 | 6 | 0.07% | 0.21% | 0.39% |
| Asian alone (NH) | 6 | 7 | 20 | 0.44% | 0.49% | 1.29% |
| Native Hawaiian or Pacific Islander alone (NH) | 0 | 1 | 0 | 0.00% | 0.07% | 0.00% |
| Other race alone (NH) | 0 | 0 | 9 | 0.00% | 0.00% | 0.58% |
| Mixed race or Multiracial (NH) | 8 | 19 | 85 | 0.58% | 1.33% | 5.47% |
| Hispanic or Latino (any race) | 17 | 47 | 42 | 1.24% | 3.28% | 2.70% |
| Total | 1,375 | 1,432 | 1,554 | 100.00% | 100.00% | 100.00% |

=== 2020 census ===
As of the 2020 census, Lakeshire had a population of 1,554. The median age was 38.1 years. 21.9% of residents were under the age of 18 and 16.2% were 65 years of age or older. For every 100 females, there were 88.8 males, and for every 100 females age 18 and over, there were 87.8 males.

100.0% of residents lived in urban areas, while 0.0% lived in rural areas.

There were 750 households, of which 28.8% had children under the age of 18 living in them. Of all households, 31.6% were married-couple households, 25.1% were households with a male householder and no spouse or partner present, and 35.6% were households with a female householder and no spouse or partner present. About 39.6% of all households were made up of individuals, and 15.2% had someone living alone who was 65 years of age or older.

There were 809 housing units, of which 7.3% were vacant. The homeowner vacancy rate was 0.0% and the rental vacancy rate was 6.4%.

=== 2010 census ===
As of the census of 2010, there were 1,432 people, 1,626 households, and 2,768 families living in the city. The population density was 2,024.1 inhabitants per square mile (781.5/km^{2}). There were 808 housing units at an average density of 3,847.6 per square mile (1,485.6/km^{2}). The racial makeup of the city was 94.7% White, 1.9% African American, 0.2% Native American, 0.5% Asian, 0.1% Pacific Islander, 1.1% from other races, and 1.5% from two or more races. Hispanic or Latino of any race were 3.3% of the population.

There were 1,626 households, of which 24.6% had children under the age of 18 living with them, 28.5% were married couples living together, 13.2% had a female householder with no husband present, 6.0% had a male householder with no wife present, and 52.4% were non-families. 45.9% of all households were made up of individuals, and 13.5% had someone living alone who was 65 years of age or older. The average household size was 2.87 and the average family size was 3.71.

The median age in the city was 34.8 years. 30.1% of residents were under the age of 18; 13.8% were between the ages of 18 and 24; 37.5% were from 25 to 44; 14.6% were from 45 to 64; and 4% were 65 years of age or older. The gender makeup of the city was 49.7 male and 50.3 female.

=== 2000 census ===
As of the census of 2000, there were 3,874 people, 1,898 households, and 821 families living in the city. The population density was 2,160.0 inhabitants per square mile (834.0/km^{2}). There were 797 housing units at an average density of 3,730.8 per square mile (1,440.5/km^{2}). The racial makeup of the city was 98.47% White, 0.36% African American, 0.07% Native American, 0.44% Asian, and 0.65% from two or more races. Hispanic or Latino of any race were 1.24% of the population.

There were 2,023 households, out of which 17.8% had children under the age of 18 living with them, 27.6% were married couples living together, 10.5% had a female householder with no husband present, and 58.5% were non-families. 52.1% of all households were made up of individuals, and 16.3% had someone living alone who was 65 years of age or older. The average household size was 1.79 and the average family size was 2.67.

In the city, the population was spread out, with 16.9% under the age of 18, 9.7% from 18 to 24, 32.3% from 25 to 44, 23.8% from 45 to 64, and 17.3% who were 65 years of age or older. The median age was 40 years. For every 100 females, there were 74.5 males. For every 100 females age 18 and over, there were 70.9 males.

The median income for a household in the city was $34,970, and the median income for a family was $43,393. Males had a median income of $35,938 versus $28,385 for females. The per capita income for the city was $26,269. About 2.8% of families and 3.9% of the population were below the poverty line, including 2.1% of those under age 18 and 6.5% of those age 65 or over.

== Transportation ==
=== Bus ===
Bus service in Lakeshire is provided by Metro. Bus service connects Lakeshire to other communities and downtown St. Louis.

=== Road ===
Gravois Road (Missouri Route 30) runs through Lakeshire west-east, and Tesson Ferry Road (Missouri Route 21) runs north–south through central Lakeshire.
