= Audrey Kissel =

American baseball player

- Second base
- Born: February 27, 1926; St. Louis, Missouri, U.S.
- Died: March 19, 2017 (aged 91); St. Louis, Missouri, U.S.
- Batted: Right Threw: Right

Teams
- Minneapolis Millerettes (1944)

Career highlights and awards
- Women in Baseball – AAGPBL Permanent Display at the Baseball Hall of Fame and Museum (since 1988)

Audrey Susan Kissel [Lafser] (February 27, 1926 – March 19, 2017) was an American infielder who played in the All-American Girls Professional Baseball League (AAGPBL). She batted and threw right handed.

Audrey Kissel played the 1944 season with the Minneapolis Millerettes, but she did not return the next year and opted for married life instead.

Born in St. Louis, Missouri, Audrey was one of six siblings born to John and Alma Kissel. Audrey learned to play baseball from her three brothers. She attended Hancock High School in St. Louis, where she played basketball, softball and volleyball, and captained all of those teams.

Audrey then played in a preparatory baseball league until she was 18, and was ready to play in the All-American League. 'Kiss', as her teammates dubbed her, would eventually play second base for the Millerettes. Moreover, the press called her 'Pigtails' because of the way she wore her hair.

A lively fielder and speedy runner, Kissel joined an infield that included Vivian Kellogg (1B), Betty Trezza (SS) and Marge Callaghan (3B). She hit .189 (68-for-360) and stole 47 bases in 102 games, collecting a double, three triples and one home run, while scoring 47 runs with 19 RBI. As a fielder, she hauled in 261 putouts with 182 assists and turned 20 double plays, while committing 37 errors in 480 total chances for a .923 fielding average.

During the off-season, Kissel was notified that her boyfriend, a sailor in the US Navy, had been listed as killed in action. Nevertheless, the news was denied later by government authorities, and afterward, he returned home to her before she signed a new contract to play in the league.

Audrey married Frederick Lafser in 1945 and they had five children. A year after being married, she played for the Parichy Bloomer Girls of the National Girls Baseball League based in Chicago.

In 1988 she was inaugurated into the Baseball Hall of Fame and Museum at Cooperstown, New York, that honored those who were part of the All-American Girls Professional Baseball League. Audrey, along with the rest of the girls and the league staff, is included at the display/exhibit. In 1996, she was inducted into the Hancock High School Hall of Fame for her time in the All-American Girls Professional Baseball League. Additionally, each year the school presents the Audrey Kissel/Lafser Athletic Award which is named in her honor.

On March 19, 2017, after living a full life, Audrey Kissel Lafser died in St. Louis, Missouri, at the age of 91.

== Personal life ==
One of her relatives, Jacqueline Laverne Krause (née Kissel) married Ronald "Ron" Krause, a second-generation manager of Krause Key & Lock, a locksmith service and key store located in St. Louis. Together they have 3 children including Audrey’s nephews as well his first son, Eric Krause who served as the said store’s third-generation and current manager, and his second son, Shawn Krause who known for his career as an animator in Pixar Animation Studios.
