= Witzel Alt Academy =

SCOPE/SSLCMS

Location
- 3100 Lemay Ferry Road; Mehlville, Missouri 63125; United States
- Coordinates: 38.5126°N 90.3145°W

Information
- School type: Alternative
- School district: Mehlville School District
- Superintendent: Chris Gaines
- Principal: Scott McMullen
- Faculty: 7
- Grades: 9–12
- Campus: Suburban
- Colors: Indigo, Gold, Black
- Website: https://scope.mehlvilleschooldistrict.com/

The South County Opportunity for the Purpose of Education (SCOPE) program is an alternative High School program, housed at the Witzel Learning Center in Mehlville, St. Louis County, Missouri. It is part of the Mehlville School District.
