= Lemay, Missouri =

- Unincorporated community Census-designated place
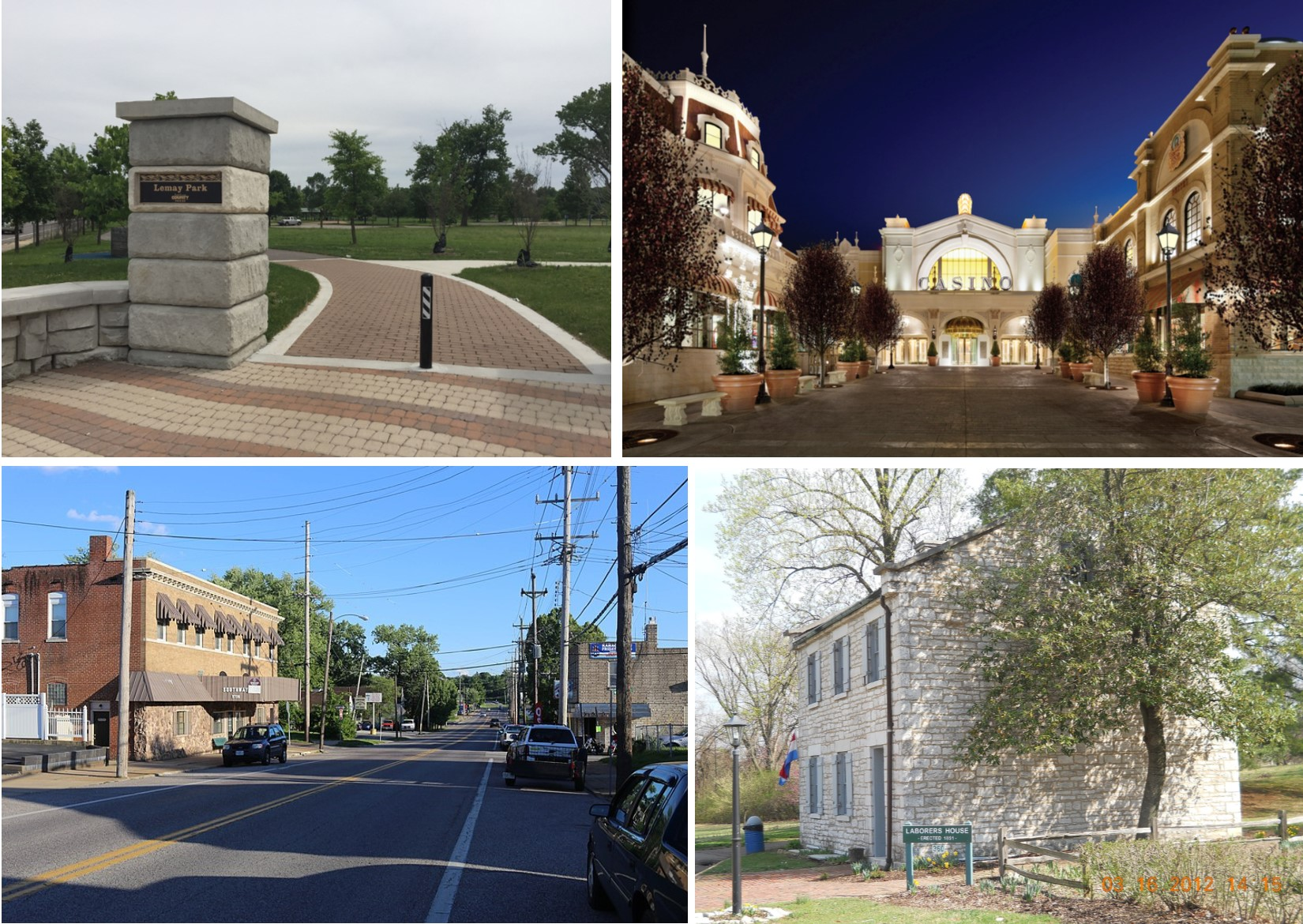
- From top left: Lemay Park, River City Casino, South Broadway, Jefferson Barracks Historic District

- Location of Lemay, Missouri
- Coordinates: 38°31′57″N 90°17′04″W
- Country: United States
- State: Missouri
- County: St. Louis
- Township: Lemay

Area
  - Total: 4.31 sq mi (11.15 km^{2})
  - Land: 4.09 sq mi (10.59 km^{2})
  - Water: 0.22 sq mi (0.56 km^{2})
- Elevation: 499 ft (152 m)

Population (2020)
  - Total: 17,117
  - Density: 4,184.8/sq mi (1,615.76/km^{2})
- Time zone: UTC-6 (Central (CST))
  - Summer (DST): UTC-5 (CDT)
- ZIP code: 63125
- Area code(s): 314/557
- FIPS code: 29-41438
- GNIS feature ID: 2393097

Lemay is an unincorporated community and census-designated place (CDP) in Lemay Township, St. Louis County, Missouri, United States. The population was 17,117 at the 2020 census.

== History ==
Lemay was named after Francois Lemai, who operated a ferry boat across the Meramec River in the early 19th century.

== Geography ==
According to the United States Census Bureau, the CDP has a total area of 4.5 square miles (12 km^{2}), of which 4.3 square miles (11 km^{2}) is land and 0.2 square miles (0.52 km^{2}), or 4.19%, is water.

== Demographics ==
Historical population
Census	Pop.	Note	%±
2000	17,215		—
2010	16,645		−3.3%
2020	17,117		2.8%
U.S. Decennial Census

=== Racial and ethnic composition ===
Lemay CDP, Missouri – Racial and ethnic composition Note: the US Census treats Hispanic/Latino as an ethnic category. This table excludes Latinos from the racial categories and assigns them to a separate category. Hispanics/Latinos may be of any race.
Race / Ethnicity (NH = Non-Hispanic)	Pop 2000	Pop 2010	Pop 2020	% 2000	% 2010	% 2020
White alone (NH)	16,415	15,255	13,655	95.35%	91.65%	79.77%
Black or African American alone (NH)	175	284	837	1.02%	1.71%	4.89%
Native American or Alaska Native alone (NH)	46	43	51	0.27%	0.26%	0.30%
Asian alone (NH)	89	278	671	0.52%	1.67%	3.92%
Native Hawaiian or Pacific Islander alone (NH)	2	6	4	0.01%	0.04%	0.02%
Other race alone (NH)	2	7	55	0.01%	0.04%	0.32%
Mixed race or Multiracial (NH)	137	255	998	0.80%	1.53%	5.83%
Hispanic or Latino (any race)	349	517	846	2.03%	3.11%	4.94%
Total	17,215	16,645	17,117	100.00%	100.00%	100.00%

=== 2020 census ===
As of the 2020 census, Lemay had a population of 17,117. The median age was 40.6 years. 20.1% of residents were under the age of 18 and 17.6% of residents were 65 years of age or older. For every 100 females there were 93.6 males, and for every 100 females age 18 and over there were 90.8 males age 18 and over.

100.0% of residents lived in urban areas, while 0.0% lived in rural areas.

There were 7,077 households in Lemay, of which 26.5% had children under the age of 18 living in them. Of all households, 37.3% were married-couple households, 22.8% were households with a male householder and no spouse or partner present, and 31.0% were households with a female householder and no spouse or partner present. About 33.3% of all households were made up of individuals and 13.4% had someone living alone who was 65 years of age or older.

There were 7,640 housing units, of which 7.4% were vacant. The homeowner vacancy rate was 2.3% and the rental vacancy rate was 6.5%.

=== 2000 census ===
At the 2000 census there were 17,215 people, 7,186 households, and 4,390 families living in the CDP. The population density was 3,959.0 inhabitants per square mile (1,528.6/km^{2}). There were 7,580 housing units at an average density of 1,743.2 per square mile (673.1/km^{2}). The racial makeup of the CDP was 98.51% White, 0.02% African American, 0.007% Native American, 0.53% Asian, 0.01% Pacific Islander, 0.66% from other races, and 0.96% from two or more races. Hispanic or Latino of any race were 1.03%. Of the 7,186 households 26.5% had children under the age of 18 living with them, 43.6% were married couples living together, 12.6% had a female householder with no husband present, and 38.9% were non-families. 34.3% of households were one person and 16.8% were one person aged 65 or older. The average household size is 2.33 and the average family size was 2.99.

The age distribution was 22.8% under the age of 18, 7.7% from 18 to 24, 27.9% from 25 to 44, 21.4% from 45 to 64, and 20.1% 65 or older. The median age was 39 years. For every 100 females, there were 89.8 males. For every 100 females age 18 and over, there were 84.0 males.

The median household income was $34,559 and the median family income was $41,128. Males had a median income of $31,886 versus $25,388 for females. The per capita income for the CDP was $18,730. About 7.1% of families and 10.4% of the population were below the poverty line, including 13.2% of those under the age of 18 and 11.3% of those ages 65 and older.

== Schools ==
Hancock is the primary school district in Lemay. Hancock enrolls approximately 1600 students.
