= Jackie Billet =

American soccer player (born 1974)

Personal information
- Full name: Jacqueline Billet
- Date of birth: January 23, 1974 (age 52)
- Place of birth: United States
- Height: 5 ft 4 in (1.63 m)
- Position: Midfielder

Youth career
- –1992: Oakville Tigers
- 1991: J.B. Marine S.C.

College career
Years	Team	Apps	(Gls)
1992–1995	Wisconsin Badgers	?	(26)

International career
1992	United States	1	(0)

Managerial career
- 1997–2001: Illinois State Redbirds (assistant)

Jacqueline Billet (born January 23, 1974) is an American former soccer player who played as a midfielder, making one appearance for the United States women's national team.

== Career ==
In high school, Billet played for the Oakville Tigers, where she had a team record of 25 assists in a season and was an All-Metro player in 1991. In college, she played for the Wisconsin Badgers from 1992 to 1995, where she was a letter-winner. In total, she scored 26 goals and registered 20 assists. She was selected for the NSCAA All-Region first team in 1992, 1993, and 1994, as well as the third team in 1995. She was also included in the All-Big Ten Conference first team in 1994. In 1996, she was selected as part of the West Squad for the Umbro College All-Star Soccer Classic, and in 2008 was inducted into the Oakville High School Hall of Fame as a part of the school's 1991 women's championship-winning soccer team.

Billet made her only international appearance for the United States on August 16, 1992 in a friendly match against Norway, which finished as a 2–4 loss.

From 1997 to 2001, Billet served as an assistant coach at Illinois State Redbirds.

== Career statistics ==
=== International ===
United States
Year	Apps	Goals
1992	1	0
Total	1	0
