= Oakville High School =

American high school in St. Louis County, Missouri

Location
- 5557 Milburn Road; Oakville, Missouri 63129; United States; 38.4722°N 90.31987°W

Information
- Type: Public comprehensive high school
- Motto: "Because of what we do, our students will be prepared for the future."
- Established: 1970; 56 years ago
- School district: Mehlville School District
- Superintendent: Chris Gaines
- NCES School ID: 292067001118
- Principal: Brian Brennan
- Teaching staff: 113.30 (on an FTE basis)
- Grades: 9–12
- Enrollment: 1,818 (2023–24)
- Student to teacher ratio: 16.05
- Colors: Black and gold
- Fight song: Every True Son/Fight, Tigers!
- Athletics conference: Suburban Conference
- Nickname: Tigers
- Rival: Mehlville Panthers
- Feeder schools: Bernard Middle School Oakville Middle School
- Website: ohs.mehlvilleschooldistrict.com

Oakville High School (formerly Oakville Senior High School) is a public comprehensive high school in Oakville, Missouri that is part of the Mehlville R-9 School District.

== History ==
The school was developed in the 1970s. At that time the district had high enrollments and severe overcrowding at Mehlville High School, mainly due to a major population increase in the Oakville area. The temporary solution was establishing a ninth-grade center; it was housed at the district's Jefferson Barracks Building near the Jefferson Barracks Military Post, and began offering classes in September 1970.

A second four-year high school was planned to alleviate the overcrowding so the ninth-grade center could move to a new building in Oakville in the fall of 1973 and be formally established as Oakville Senior High School.

Two weeks before the beginning of the 1973–74 school year electric panels were uncovered and the gym floor was not fully installed. The building opened on time, not fully finished.

Oakville High School was built on the top of a hill. After sinkholes in the school's back lot were fixed, a football field was built on campus. The stadium would later be named "Roger E. Estes Field" after the Athletics Director.

The school's colors are black and gold and the school mascot is the Tiger. The school uses similar branding to the University of Missouri Tigers, most notably with Oakville using the Missouri Tigers logo to represent them in athletics.

== Student body ==
Oakville has a co-educational student body of 1,780 in 2024, with a student teacher ratio of 16:1. Most students come from Bernard Middle School and Oakville Middle School, with a handful coming from Washington Middle School and Margaret Buerkle Middle School. The racial makeup of the school is approximately 83% White, 5% Black, 4% Asian, 3% Hispanic, and 4% mixed-race. The school graduates 92% of its students, slightly below the Missouri state average.

== Athletics ==
For the 2013–14 school year, the school offered 27 activities approved by the Missouri State High School Activities Association (MSHSAA): baseball, boys and girls basketball, sideline cheerleading, boys and girls cross country, dance team, field hockey, football, boys and girls golf, music activities, scholar bowl, boys and girls soccer, softball, speech and debate, boys and girls swimming and diving, boys and girls tennis, boys and girls track and field, boys and girls volleyball, water polo, and wrestling. In addition to its current activities, Oakville students have won several state championships, including:

- Girls Water Polo: 2022
- Boys soccer: 1976, 2000
- Girls soccer: 1981, 1991
- Girls track and field: 1994
- Girls softball: 2010
- Boys Volleyball: 2011
- Wrestling: 1998

== Notable alumni ==
- Jackie Billet, Former U.S. international soccer player
- Chase Bradley, NHL player for the Colorado Avalanche
- Patrick (Pat) Maroon, NHL player for the Minnesota Wild
- Steve Ralston, Former MLS and USNT soccer player
