= Patrick Maroon =

American ice hockey player (born 1988)

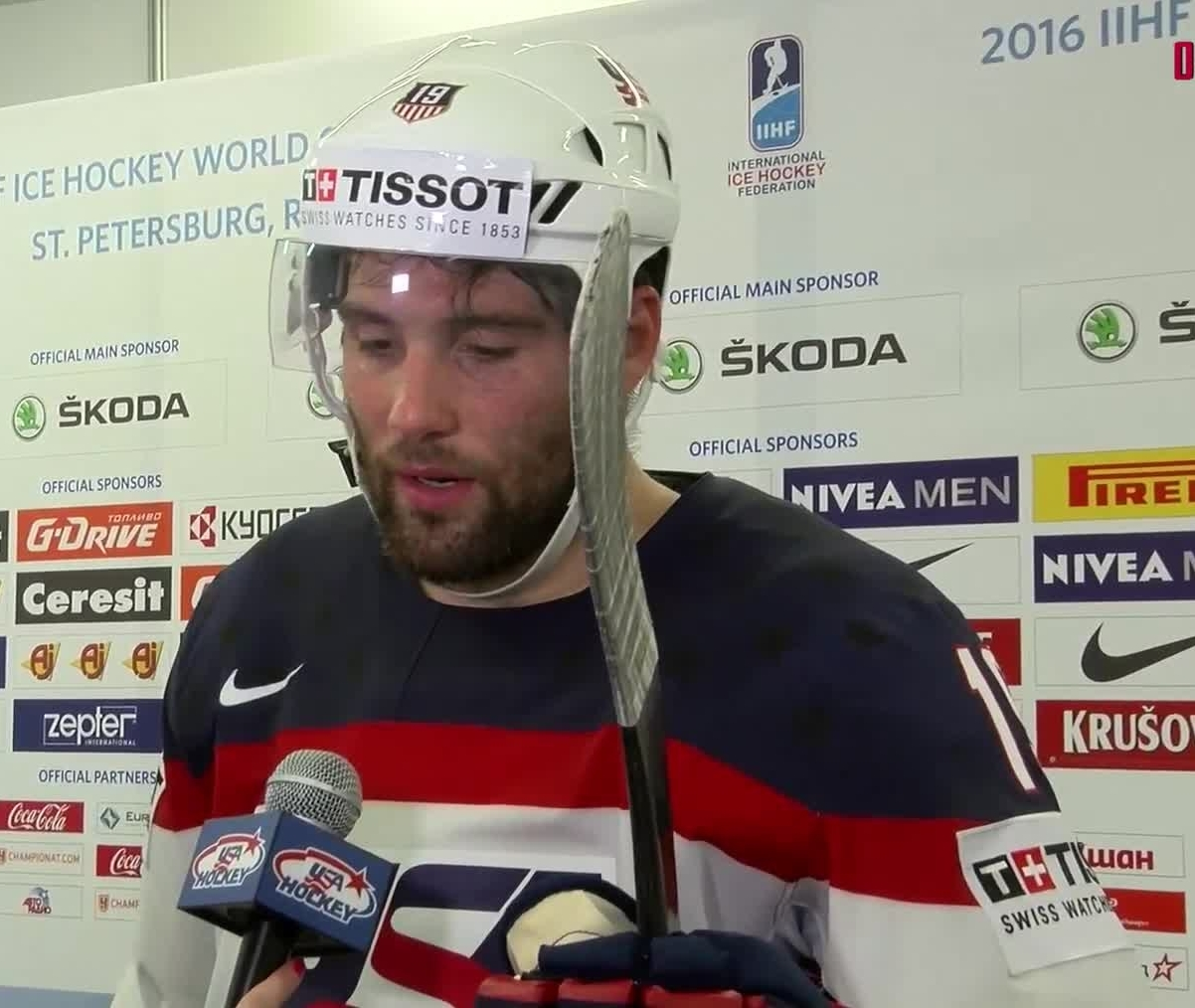
- Maroon with the United States hockey team in 2016
- Born: April 23, 1988 (age 38) St. Louis, Missouri, U.S.
- Height: 6 ft 3 in (191 cm)
- Weight: 234 lb (106 kg; 16 st 10 lb)
- Position: Left wing
- Shot: Left
- Played for: Anaheim Ducks; Edmonton Oilers; New Jersey Devils; St. Louis Blues; Tampa Bay Lightning; Minnesota Wild; Boston Bruins; Chicago Blackhawks
- National team: United States
- NHL draft: 161st overall, 2007; Philadelphia Flyers
- Playing career: 2008–2025

Patrick Maroon (born April 23, 1988) is an American former professional ice hockey player who was a left winger in the National Hockey League (NHL). Nicknamed "Big Rig", Maroon played for the Anaheim Ducks, Edmonton Oilers, New Jersey Devils, St. Louis Blues, Tampa Bay Lightning, Minnesota Wild, Boston Bruins and Chicago Blackhawks. Maroon is a three-time Stanley Cup champion, winning in three consecutive seasons (with the Blues in 2019, and the Lightning in 2020 and 2021).

Growing up in St. Louis, Maroon attended Oakville High School where he was recruited to play in the North American Hockey League (NAHL) by Kelly Chase and Al MacInnis. Following two standout seasons with the Texarkana Bandits, he was drafted 161st overall by the Philadelphia Flyers in the 2007 NHL entry draft. He spent three years within their organization before being traded to the Anaheim Ducks and subsequently making his NHL debut in the 2011–12 season.

Maroon played three seasons at the NHL level with the Ducks where he made an impact during their 2015 Stanley Cup playoffs run. Due to inconsistency, he was traded to the Edmonton Oilers and New Jersey Devils before landing with his hometown St. Louis Blues in 2018.

In his only season with the Blues, he helped them win the Stanley Cup for the first time in franchise history. He would win the Stanley Cup twice more in the next two years with the Lightning, becoming one of twelve players in NHL history to win back-to-back Stanley Cups on different teams, and the first since Cory Stillman in 2006. In 2021, Maroon became the first player to win three consecutive Stanley Cups since several members of the New York Islanders did so from 1980 to 1983.

== Early life ==
Maroon was born on April 23, 1988, in St. Louis, Missouri, to parents Patti and Phil Maroon. His father formerly played Division I soccer at St. Louis University and wished to encourage his sons to play the sport. He grew up the youngest of four siblings, two brothers, and one sister. His father owned season tickets to the St. Louis Blues and he would alternate going to games with his brother Phil or one would sit on their father's lap. When reflecting on his childhood, Maroon said, "My family has been the biggest influence on my career...my parents have always been so dedicated and my brothers were always into the game, and helped me along."

Growing up in St. Louis, Maroon attended Rogers Elementary and Oakville Middle School. He attended Oakville High School in St. Louis County, Missouri, but left before graduating to pursue junior-level hockey. He was not pictured—or even listed as "not pictured"—in the 2005 or 2006 Oakville High School yearbooks, suggesting he was no longer enrolled after his sophomore year. However, he does appear in a team photo for the Oakville ice hockey club during his sophomore year.

By the 2005–2006 season, Maroon was playing for the Texarkana Bandits of the North American Hockey League (NAHL), marking the start of his junior hockey career.

He played minor ice hockey for the St. Louis Amateur Blues from 2003 until 2005, where he was nicknamed "Fat Pat" due to his size, 6 ft 1 in (1.85 m) and 260 lb (120 kg). In order to improve his playmaking ability, Maroon would stickhandle a golf ball in his garage for hours and skate in roller rinks.

As a youth, Maroon also competed in the 2002 Quebec International Pee-Wee Hockey Tournament with the St. Louis Blues minor ice hockey team. In 2004, Maroon was drafted in the 11th round of the Ontario Hockey League (OHL) draft by the London Knights but was dismissed from their training camp due to his weight.

When he entered high school with his older brother Justin, Maroon earned a spot on the varsity team as a freshman.

== Playing career ==
=== Early career ===
While playing high school hockey, Maroon caught the attention of Kelly Chase and Al MacInnis who had recently purchased a North American Hockey League (NAHL) team, the Texarkana Bandits. After meeting with his parents, Maroon joined their team for one season and recorded 60 points in 57 games. He was subsequently named to the NAHL's All-Rookie Team. As the team was in its early stages, Maroon and other rookies would build the rink, paint the ice, and put up boards, as well as cover the ice if the rodeo was in town. In spite of his success, he still went undrafted in the 2006 NHL entry draft and Chase and MacInnis encouraged him to work out every day. This resulted in him losing 30 pounds over the summer and increasing his offensive output to 95 points in 57 games during the 2006–07 season. In the same season, the team moved to St. Louis and won their first Robertson Cup National Championship title. During their playoff berth, Maroon recorded 23 points in 12 playoff games and set the league record for most points in a single postseason. Maroon subsequently became the first Bandits player to win the NAHL's MVP award and was drafted by the Philadelphia Flyers in the sixth round, 161st overall, in the 2007 NHL entry draft. He had been unaware he had been drafted until his father saw his name on ESPN while watching Maroon at a roller hockey tournament. Prior to his selection, Maroon was ranked by the NHL Central Scouting Bureau as a "B" prospect, meaning he was expected to be drafted in the later rounds.

Following the draft, Maroon was assigned to major junior ice hockey team, the London Knights of the OHL, who had drafted him in the 2004 OHL Selection Draft. Maroon had been invited to the Flyers' rookie and main training camps but was reassigned to the Knights after one exhibition game with their American Hockey League (AHL) affiliate. Although he had previously agreed to play NCAA ice hockey with Ferris State University, Mark and Dale Hunter convinced him to play in the OHL. When speaking about his decision, Maroon said "I am really excited about coming to London and playing for the Knights. I think it is a great place for me to develop to be a hockey player." Due to his consistent weight struggles, the Knights hired Maroon a personal trainer during the season and he dropped to 217 pounds. In his first, and only, season with the team Maroon was named to the Western Conference All-Star Team and earned team MVP. He ended the season leading the team with 90 points in 64 games and one assist in five playoff games before joining the Flyers' AHL affiliate the Philadelphia Phantoms. He played one game with the Phantoms as they closed out their 2007–08 season.

Maroon began his first full professional season during the 2008–09 AHL season with the Phantoms after being assigned to the AHL following the Flyers' training camp. He ranked fourth on the team with 54 points in 80 games and recorded a team-high three points in four playoff games. The following year, the Phantoms were the only team in the league to record under 200 goals, of which Maroon contributed 11. His season lacked consistency due to injuries but he managed to set a new career-high in assists with 33.

During the summer of 2010, Maroon led the United States men's national inline hockey team to a gold medal performance at the 2010 IIHF InLine Hockey World Championship. He had been allowed on the team without trying out due to his infamous play at the AHL level. He scored 7 goals and 14 points in 6 games at the in-line worlds including a goal and an assist in the gold medal game in Karlstad, Sweden, against the Czech Republic. When he returned to the AHL, the coaching staff was unhappy with his conditioning and released him from the team. Head coach Greg Gilbert told the media that "he wasn't committed to himself...in Patrick's case, I don't really think he knew how to train and play at that level." His agent tried arranging for him to play in the ECHL or with a Swiss team but the Flyers wouldn't release his rights. For two months, he skated with the Montclair State University Red Hawks Men's Hockey team to stay in shape. He considered enrolling in college but was then informed he had been traded. On November 21, 2010, Philadelphia traded Maroon and David Laliberté to the Anaheim Ducks in exchange for forward Rob Bordson and defenseman Danny Syvret.

=== Professional (2011–present) ===
==== Anaheim Ducks (2011–2016) ====
Shortly after the trade, Maroon was assigned to Anaheim's AHL affiliate, the Syracuse Crunch. Upon his arrival in Syracuse, coach Mark Holick told him, "I traded my best player for you. I don't know what you did in Philly, but I hope you can play." He scored 11 minutes 10 seconds into his first game with the Crunch, and ended the season with 21 goals and 48 points in 57 games. Maroon credited his success to his off-season training and the Crunch's coaching staff. As a result of his successful season, he was invited to the Ducks' training camp prior to the 2011–12 season but was sent on waivers back to the Crunch. After scoring three points in the Crunch's home opener against his former team, the Ducks recalled him to the NHL level for his debut. He made his debut on October 25 against the Chicago Blackhawks, playing 15:19 minutes of ice time. He played two more games for the team alongside Corey Perry and Ryan Getzlaf before being returned to the AHL. Upon reuniting with the Crunch, Maroon eclipsed 200 AHL points and recorded a hat trick in a 6–3 win over the Norfolk Admirals. He was subsequently signed to a contract extension with the Ducks through the 2012–13 season.

The 2012–13 season was shortened due to a lockout but when the Ducks returned to play, Maroon was placed on a line with Mathieu Perreault and Teemu Selanne. Speaking of the experience, Maroon said "hugging Teemu Selanne, scoring goals, you'll never forget those moments...Those are the moments I can tell Anthony, tell my future kids, that I played with the best players in the world." He played the majority of the season in the AHL but scored two goals in 11 games with the Ducks during call ups throughout the season. On March 21, 2013, the Ducks signed Maroon to a two-year contract extension. The 2013–14 season was Maroon's first full NHL season, during which he appeared in 62 games, scoring 11 goals to go with 18 assists. Although he had a year left on his contract, the Ducks signed him to a three-year contract extension on August 2, 2014.

In the final year of his second contract, Maroon appeared in 71 games, only missing a few due to injury. He missed four weeks at the beginning of the season due to a sprained MCL which he suffered during a game against the Buffalo Sabres. Upon returning to the lineup, Maroon would appear in 71 games, scoring a career high 9 goals with 25 assists. His offensive game came alive in the 2015 Stanley Cup playoffs, scoring eight goals in 16 games while playing on the Ducks' top line. Maroon was one of the Ducks' most consistent players during their series, finishing third on the team in goals and power play points as well as limited his penalty minutes.

In the 2015–16 season, Maroon found himself playing with the fourth line for the Ducks at the beginning of the season. At times his play was exemplary and other times he often saw his ice time drop to below ten minutes a game. He was reunited with Corey Perry and found his scoring touch, picking up consecutive points in consecutive games, while scoring just 4 goals and 13 points in 56 games. In spite of his low offensive output, he traveled with Perry and his wife to Pelican Hill Resort on trade deadline day where he was then informed by his mother that he had been traded to Edmonton.

==== Edmonton Oilers (2016–2018) ====
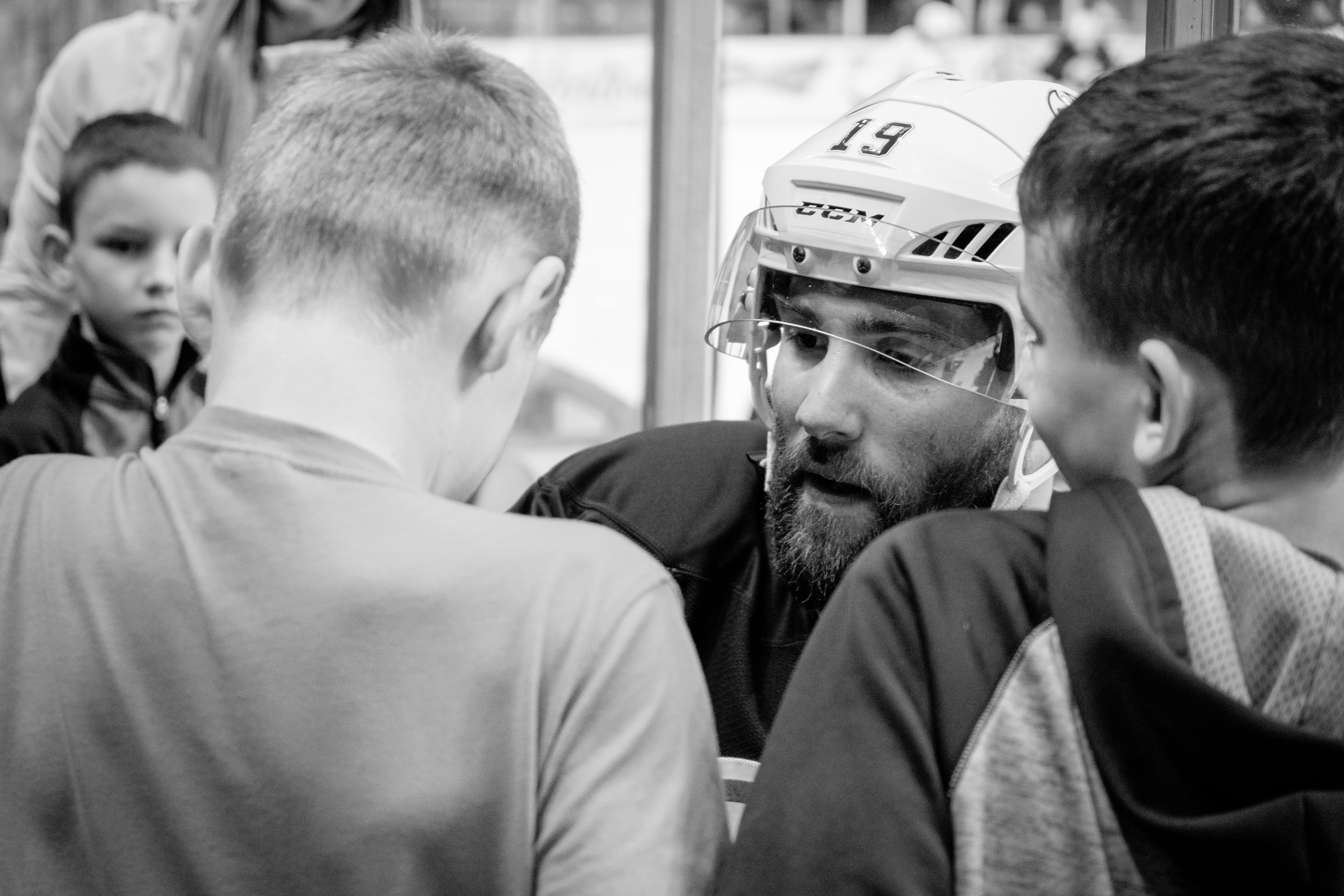
Maroon signing autographs during his time with the Oilers

On February 29, 2016, Maroon was traded to the Edmonton Oilers in exchange for Martin Gernát and a fourth-round pick in the 2016 NHL entry draft. He made his Oilers debut on March 3 against the Philadelphia Flyers, where he scored his fifth goal of the season during the second period to bring their lead to three. After scoring against his old organization, Maroon said "it all hit me...it brought me back to my time in Philly, when I didn't know how to train, I was out of shape, my dark days. And then now, like, holy f---, this is really happening." His style of play earned him time on the wing of Connor McDavid who he said played differently than his former Ducks teammates. "With Connor, you have great speed in the neutral zone and I just try to play big on the boards, chip the puck out and make sure he gets it. He skates with speed, and Ebs has got really good skill and a good shot. It’s been good. They’re two different experiences, but it’s been good for me." As the Oilers failed to qualify for the 2016 Stanley Cup playoffs, Maroon, Oilers GM Peter Chiarelli and head coach Todd McLellan discussed their expectations of Maroon for his offseason conditioning. During the offseason, Maroon returned home to St. Louis where he made a change to his lifestyle and training habits. The Oilers Head Strength and Conditioning Coach Chad Drummond teamed him up with a nutritionist who helped him manage his portion controls and eating habits. As a result, he dropped roughly 15 pounds and 3% body fat in the off-season.

On April 11, 2016, Maroon was named to Team USA's 2016 IIHF World Championship roster alongside teammate Matt Hendricks. He became the first United States player to represent his country at both an inline and ice hockey world championship. In his debut game with the United States men's national ice hockey team, Maroon scored their first and only goal in an eventual 5–1 loss to Canada. His goal came less than five minutes into the first period off an assist from Kyle Connor. He would end the tournament collecting two more points as Team USA failed to medal. When Maroon returned to the Oilers for their 2016 training camp, McLellan was pleased with Maroon's offseason condition. During a preseason game against the Vancouver Canucks, Maroon was checked hard into a corner and was forced to leave the game early. In spite of this, he returned to the Oilers lineup for their preseason game against the Anaheim Ducks on October 5 where he recorded one assist and his first goal of the preseason. Following the exhibition games, the Oilers opened their 2016–17 season playing in their new arena, Rogers Place. In the Oilers first home game on October 12, Maroon scored the first goal in the Rogers Place arena in a 7–4 victory over the Calgary Flames.

Maroon continued to play the remainder of the 2016–17 season with the Oilers alongside Connor McDavid where they recorded a combined Corsi percentage above 50 percent. During the offseason, the Oilers had signed Milan Lucic to play with McDavid but Maroon was deemed to be a better fit. On January 5, 2017, Maroon scored his first career NHL hat-trick in a 4–3 win over the Boston Bruins, breaking the Oilers losing record against Boston which began in November 1996. He ended the season with a new career high 27 total goals and 15 assists, the best for any NHL player born and raised in St. Louis. McDavid, who ended the season with 100 points, assisted on 14 of Maroon's 27 goals. In March, Maroon was named the Oilers nominee for the Bill Masterton Memorial Trophy, given to a player who "best exemplifies the qualities of perseverance, sportsmanship, and dedication to ice hockey." With his assistance, the Oilers qualified for the 2017 Stanley Cup playoffs where they faced off against the San Jose Sharks in Round 1. He scored his first goal of the playoffs in game five to lift the Oilers 4–3 over the Sharks and lead the series 3–2. Upon winning their first series against the Sharks, Maroon and the Oilers began the Western Conference Second Round against the Anaheim Ducks. In game two of the series, Maroon scored his first career goal against his former team to lift the Oilers in a 2–1 win. The Ducks would come back to win the series in seven games and Maroon recorded eight points in 13 games.

Following his career-best season, Maroon returned to the Oilers for the 2017–18 season determined to continue his high scoring play on McDavid's wing. Both McDavid and winger Leon Draisaitl had signed contracts to remain with the Oilers during the offseason while Maroon remained unsigned on his final year of his contract. During training camp, Maroon continued to play with McDavid and Draisaitl on the Oilers top line. On January 3, 2018, Maroon was suspended for two games for interfering against Los Angeles Kings defenseman Drew Doughty. Following the game, Doughty publicly stated that he felt no ill will towards Maroon and acknowledged that "he’s just trying to finish a hit. I don’t know that he meant to try and hurt me. I forgive him." He later missed another game against the Los Angeles Kings in February due to a lower body injury. At the time of his injury, he had recorded 14 goals and 16 assists in 57 games. Maroon acknowledged that as an upcoming unrestricted free-agent in July, there was a high likelihood of him being traded before the season ended. He said, "you know the situation I’m in...but I’m an Edmonton Oiler, I want to stay here. I love this city, the fans, this group of guys. I think my teammates know that."

==== New Jersey Devils (2018) ====
On February 25, 2018, Maroon was traded to the New Jersey Devils in exchange for J. D. Dudek and a third-round pick in the 2019 NHL entry draft. He was displeased with the trade and said "I didn't really want to get traded out of Edmonton...I actually loved it there. I actually liked it. The fans are great. I liked it. You know what the most important thing was? The guys were great. Unbelievable guys. You could not have found a better group of guys. But obviously I got traded for a reason. We weren't winning." He made an immediate impact on the team, recording eight points in his first 12 games and earned praise from his teammates on his playmaking ability. Center Travis Zajac spoke highly of Maroon saying, "we're a high-skill, fast team, but you add a player like Patty who can grind away and protect the puck, and bring pucks to the net, go to the net, it adds another threat for us, and it's been a good addition." He ended the season with 13 points in 16 games as he underwent surgery during the offseason to repair a herniated disc in his back.

==== St. Louis Blues (2018–2019) ====
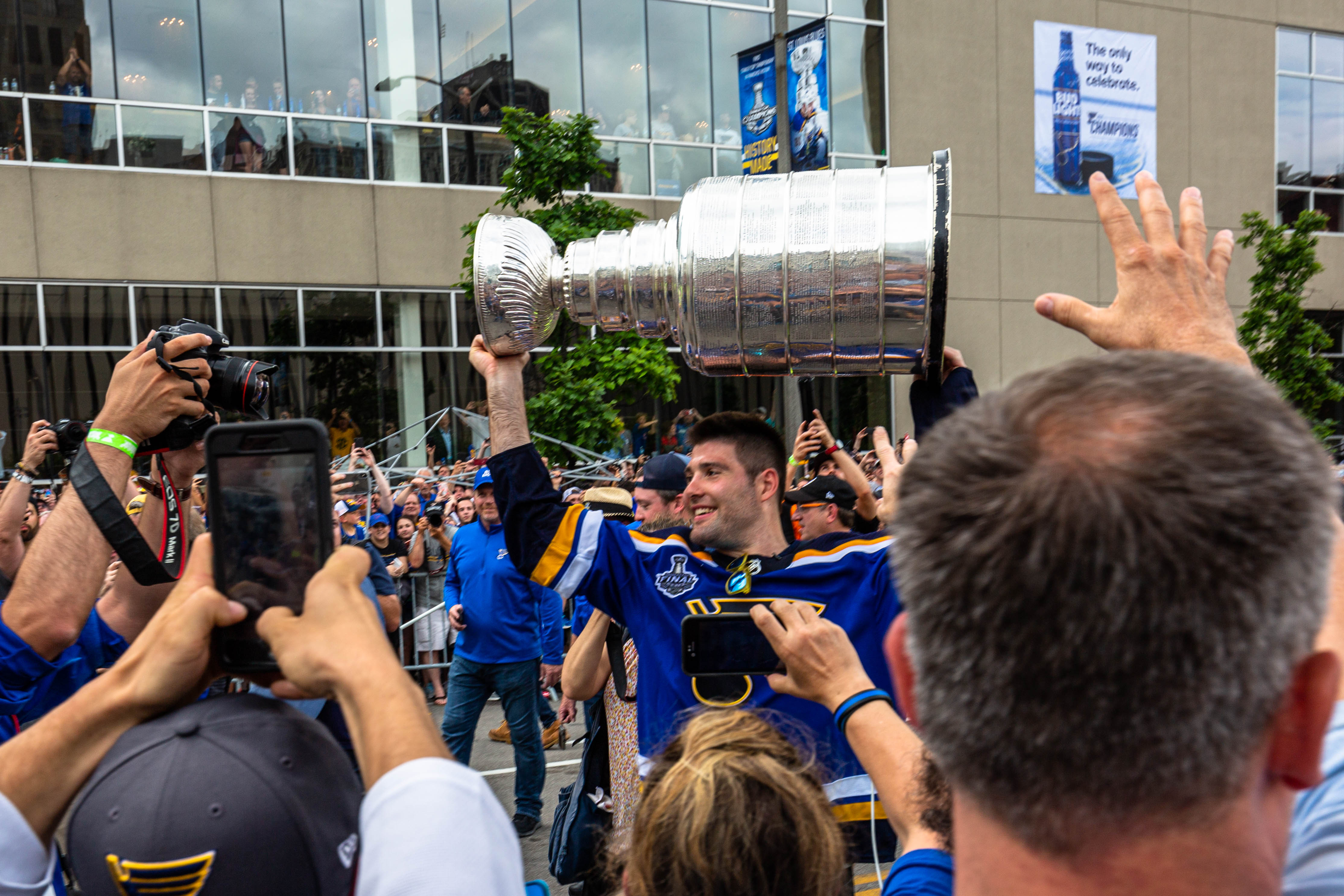
Maroon with the Stanley Cup during the St. Louis Blues' championship parade following the 2019 Stanley Cup Final

Due to his success with the Devils and Oilers, Maroon expected to be selected quickly as a free agent. Yet, after a week passed and he had only met with the St. Louis Blues, Maroon switched agents. His newest agent tried to bring him another deal with New Jersey but Maroon chose to return home and be closer to his son. On July 10, 2018, Maroon signed a one-year, $1.75 million contract with his hometown St. Louis Blues. In 74 regular season games, Maroon scored 10 goals to go with 18 assists for 28 points.

The Blues qualified for the 2019 Stanley Cup playoffs as the third seed from the Central Division, capping a turnaround in a campaign that saw them in last place in the NHL as late as January 2019. As the Blues geared up to face the Winnipeg Jets in the first round of the playoffs, Maroon's grandfather died. Maroon returned to play with the team for game one and later said he felt his grandfather's presence while assisting on the game-winning goal. He helped the team eliminate the Jets in six games and faced off against the Dallas Stars in the second round. Their series was tied 3–3 and they entered game seven facing elimination. During the game, Maroon scored the game-winning goal in double overtime to give the Blues a 4–3 series win. Following the win, the Blues defeated the San Jose Sharks in the Western Conference Final to face the Bruins in the Stanley Cup Final. On June 12, Maroon and the Blues won the Stanley Cup for the first time in franchise history, defeating the Bruins in seven games. He finished the playoffs with seven points.

==== Tampa Bay Lightning (2019–2023) ====
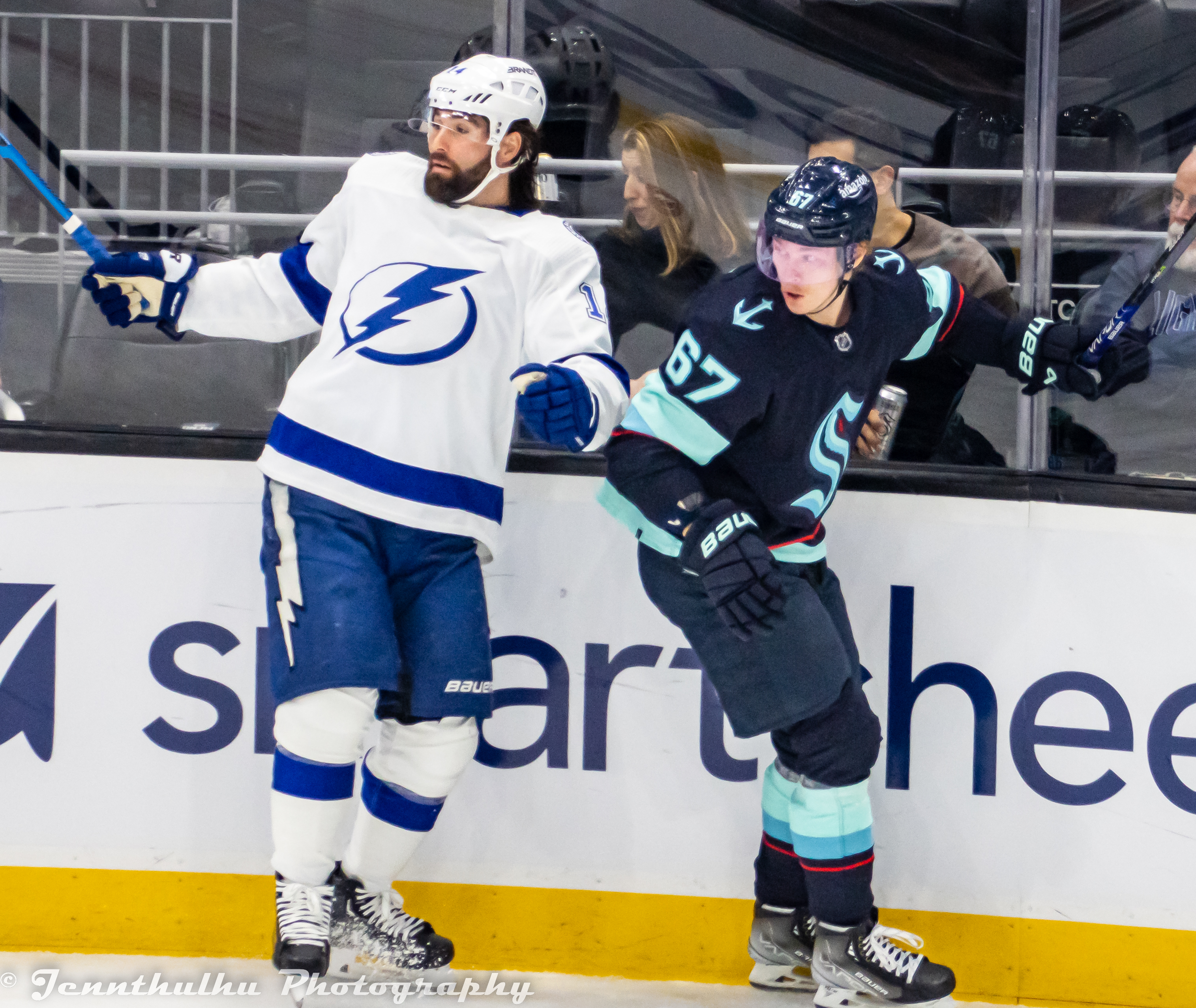
Maroon (left) and Morgan Geekie during a game in January 2023

During the 2019 offseason, Tampa Bay Lightning head coach Jon Cooper pursued Maroon in order to sign him with the team to fill the void of the premature retirement of Ryan Callahan and since Cooper had previously coached Maroon while he played in the North American Hockey League. On August 24, 2019, Maroon signed a one-year, $900,000 contract with the Lightning and changed his jersey number to 14. He played the entirety of the 2019–20 season, which was cut short due to the COVID-19 pandemic. During the pause in play, Maroon used inline skating to remain in shape. He was named to the Lightning's return to play roster for the Stanley Cup Qualifiers on July 26, 2020. On September 28, 2020, after the Lightning won the Stanley Cup, Maroon became the third player in the post-expansion era to win consecutive Stanley Cups with different teams, following Claude Lemieux and Cory Stillman.

Following the Lightnings' Stanley Cup win, Maroon signed a two-year, $1.8 million contract to remain with the Lightning on October 29, 2020. On July 7, 2021, the Tampa Bay Lightning won their franchise's third Stanley Cup, and Maroon won his third straight Stanley Cup. He subsequently is the first player to go three-for-three in different uniforms since the expansion era began in 1967 and expanded the league beyond six teams.

By February 2022, Maroon was re-signed to a two-year contract extension. He would go on to end the 2021–22 season with 11 goals and 16 assists for 27 points in 81 games played. During the 2022 playoffs, Maroon and the Lightning would go on to reach the Stanley Cup Final for a third consecutive season (fourth consecutive season and time altogether for Maroon himself), where the Lightning would lose in six games to the Colorado Avalanche.

Maroon would record five goals and nine assists for 14 points in 80 games in the 2022–23 season, while also leading the league in penalty minutes (150). Playing the Toronto Maple Leafs in the first round of the playoffs for a second consecutive year, Maroon and the Lightning would go on to lose the series in six games. He finished the 2023 playoffs goalless and with only one assist and point in all six games played.

==== Minnesota Wild (2023–2024) ====
On July 2, 2023, Maroon's four-year tenure with the Tampa Bay Lightning concluded when he was traded due to salary cap considerations, along with Maxim Čajkovič, to the Minnesota Wild in exchange for a seventh-round pick in 2024.

Maroon suffered an injury on January 27, 2024 against the Anaheim Ducks, and was placed on injured reserve a few days later on February 5. Just a couple days later, on February 7, 2024, the Wild announced that Maroon had undergone back surgery and would miss 4–6 weeks. At the time, Maroon had played in all of the Wild's games before his injury, registering four goals and 12 assists.

==== Boston Bruins (2024) ====
On March 8, 2024, Maroon was traded to the Boston Bruins for Luke Toporowski and a conditional 2026 sixth-round pick.

Still recovering from his back surgery, the Bruins placed Maroon on long term injured reserve (LTIR) just after being acquired. On April 13, 2024, Maroon was activated off the LTIR, and made his Bruins debut later that day against the Pittsburgh Penguins. Maroon would score his first point as a Bruin in game one of the opening round against the Toronto Maple Leafs, an assist on a goal by John Beecher.

==== Chicago Blackhawks and retirement (2024–2025) ====
As a free agent from the Bruins, Maroon moved to his eighth and final NHL outfit after securing a one-year, $1.3 million contract with the Chicago Blackhawks on July 1, 2024.

On March 22, 2025, Maroon announced in a pregame television interview before a game in his hometown St. Louis that he would be retiring at the end of the season. Maroon subsequently played his final NHL game in the Blackhawks' last home game of the season on April 13, forgoing the Blackhawks' two remaining road games. Maroon, alongside fellow retiree Alec Martinez, received a video tribute and standing ovation during the game, as well as a handshake line from the visiting Winnipeg Jets.

== Post-playing career ==
=== Coaching ===
On August 15, 2025, Maroon was named an assistant coach for the Muskegon Lumberjacks of the United States Hockey League.

== Personal life ==
Maroon is married to Francesca Vangel, another St. Louis native whose family runs a restaurant called Charlie Gitto's. During the COVID-19 pandemic in Missouri, they distributed food from the restaurant to the Clayton Missouri Police Department and the City of Clayton Fire Department. Maroon has a son from a previous relationship.

On November 30, 2022, after Bruins commentator Jack Edwards remarked about his weight during a game broadcast, Maroon donated $2,000 to a Tampa Bay charity to support those struggling with mental health and body image.

== Career statistics ==
=== Regular season and playoffs ===
Bold indicates led league

			Regular season					Playoffs
Season	Team	League	GP	G	A	Pts	PIM	GP	G	A	Pts	PIM
2004–05	St. Louis Amateur Blues	18U AAA	30	10	15	25	20	—	—	—	—	—
2005–06	Texarkana Bandits	NAHL	57	23	37	60	61	—	—	—	—	—
2006–07	St. Louis Bandits	NAHL	57	40	55	**95**	152	—	—	—	—	—
2007–08	London Knights	OHL	64	35	55	90	57	5	0	1	1	10
2007–08	Philadelphia Phantoms	AHL	1	0	0	0	0	—	—	—	—	—
2008–09	Philadelphia Phantoms	AHL	80	23	31	54	62	4	1	2	3	13
2009–10	Adirondack Phantoms	AHL	67	11	33	44	125	—	—	—	—	—
2010–11	Adirondack Phantoms	AHL	9	5	3	8	30	—	—	—	—	—
2010–11	Syracuse Crunch	AHL	57	21	27	48	68	—	—	—	—	—
2011–12	Syracuse Crunch	AHL	75	32	42	74	120	4	0	0	0	4
2011–12	Anaheim Ducks	NHL	2	0	0	0	2	—	—	—	—	—
2012–13	Norfolk Admirals	AHL	64	26	24	50	139	—	—	—	—	—
2012–13	Anaheim Ducks	NHL	13	2	1	3	10	—	—	—	—	—
2013–14	Anaheim Ducks	NHL	62	11	18	29	101	13	2	5	7	38
2014–15	Anaheim Ducks	NHL	71	9	25	34	82	16	7	4	11	6
2015–16	Anaheim Ducks	NHL	56	4	9	13	54	—	—	—	—	—
2015–16	Edmonton Oilers	NHL	16	8	6	14	34	—	—	—	—	—
2016–17	Edmonton Oilers	NHL	81	27	15	42	95	13	3	5	8	28
2017–18	Edmonton Oilers	NHL	57	14	16	30	60	—	—	—	—	—
2017–18	New Jersey Devils	NHL	16	3	10	13	11	5	1	0	1	0
2018–19	St. Louis Blues	NHL	74	10	18	28	64	26	3	4	7	8
2019–20	Tampa Bay Lightning	NHL	64	9	14	23	71	25	1	5	6	32
2020–21	Tampa Bay Lightning	NHL	55	4	14	18	60	23	2	2	4	37
2021–22	Tampa Bay Lightning	NHL	81	11	16	27	134	23	4	2	6	32
2022–23	Tampa Bay Lightning	NHL	80	5	9	14	**150**	6	0	1	1	16
2023–24	Minnesota Wild	NHL	49	4	12	16	60	—	—	—	—	—
2023–24	Boston Bruins	NHL	2	0	0	0	0	13	0	2	2	18
2024–25	Chicago Blackhawks	NHL	68	5	14	19	97	—	—	—	—	—
NHL totals			848	126	197	323	1,087	163	23	30	53	215

=== International ===
Year	Team	Event	Result	GP	G	A	Pts	PIM
2016	United States	WC	4th	10	1	2	3	12
Senior totals				10	1	2	3	12

== Awards and honors ==
Award	Year	Ref
NAHL
All-Rookie First Team	2006	
First All-Star Team	2007	
MVP	2007	
NHL
Stanley Cup champion	2019, 2020, 2021	
