= Mehlville School District =

School district in Missouri

Address
- 3120 Lemay Ferry Road Mehlville, Oakville, Lemay, and Concord Saint Louis, MO, 63125-4416; United States
- Coordinates: 38.514157°N 90.314737°W

District information
- Motto: "Individually Focused. Committed to All."
- Grades: Pre-Kindergarten to 12th Grade
- Established: 1930; 95 years ago
- Superintendent: Dr Jeff Haug
- Accreditation: Missouri State Board of Education
- Schools: 19

Students and staff
- Students: 11,201students
- Teachers: 715
- Staff: 545
- Student–teacher ratio: 19:1

Other information
- Website: www.mehlvilleschooldistrict.com

The Mehlville School District, officially the Mehlville R-9 School District or Mehlville R-IX School District, is a public school district based in south St. Louis County, Missouri. It serves the unincorporated, census-designated communities of Mehlville, Oakville, Concord, and Lemay. Its offices are presently located on Mehlville High School's campus, with plans to eventually move into a vacant office building just north of the campus.

The district formally began with the first graduating class of Mehlville Senior High School in 1930. The district as we know it today first consisted of smaller, independent educational entities working under a feeder school system.

In the 1950s and 60s, the state government of Missouri began to combine the thousands of small, rural schools into larger districts. So, in October 1951, the Mehlville, Oakville, Point and Washington districts consolidated their schools into a single, reorganized school district, which became the modern Mehlville R-9 School District. Years later, the district dropped the R-9 title from its name, becoming the Mehlville School District. The state Department of Education, however, continues to refer to the district as "Mehlville R-9." or "Mehlville R-IX."

After a rapid increase in enrollment of elementary and secondary students as a result of the increase of the area's population, bus transportation was introduced in 1951, and the district was forced to construct more educational facilities to meet the growing enrollment. Schools like Bierbaum and the old Bernard Elementary were built for this exact purpose.

In 1956, the district received the official title to 45 acres formerly part of the Veterans Administration Hospital Reservation at Jefferson Barracks; the land is now home to Beasley Elementary.

On May 11, 1964, the district voted to annex the Jefferson Barracks School District, acquiring what is now known as the Jefferson Barracks Building and numerous smaller facilities.

In the mid-to-late 1960s, the district continued to expand, constructing Trautwein and Wohlwend Elementary in 1964 and 1969, respectively.

Oakville Senior High School was established in 1970 due to overcrowding at Mehlville High School.

== Schools ==
It operates the following schools:

=== Early childhood ===
- Mehlville Early Childhood Education, located at John Cary Early Childhood Center in Mehlville and several elementary schools
- Early Childhood Special Education
- Parents As Teachers

=== Elementary schools ===
All MSDR9 elementary schools teach kids from Kindergarten (5-6 y/o) to 5th Grade (10-11 y/o)

==== Beasley Elementary School ====
Beasley was built in the 1960s on grounds that were originally part of the Veterans Administration Hospital at Jefferson Barracks, located in an unincorporated area near southeast Mehlville. The student population is about 300 students. The school mascot is the Jaguar. The school feeds into 2 middle schools; 70% go on to Bernard Middle, and 30% of students go on to Margaret Buerkle Middle.

==== Bierbaum Elementary School ====
Bierbaum was built in 1962 and was named after Kermit Bierbaum, a former Mehlville superintendent. The school, located in West Mehlville, is the largest elementary facility in the district with 539 students and feeds into Margaret Buerkle Middle School. The school's mascot is the Buffalo.

==== Blades Elementary School ====
Blades Elementary opened in 1972 in west Oakville, and has a student population of 409. The school mascot is the Bobcat. The school feeds into Bernard Middle and Washington Middle

==== Forder Elementary School ====
Forder Elementary is the only Mehlville School District facility located in Lemay, being first established in the 1930s. The school mascot is the Falcon. 361 students attend Forder, which feeds into Margaret Buerkle Middle.

==== Hagemann Elementary School ====
The modern Hagemann Elementary was built in 1994, but the foundations for the original school were laid as early as 1898. Located in an unincorporated area near Concord, the school mascot is the Hawk, and its 375 students will eventually go on to Washington Middle.

==== Oakville Elementary School ====
Oakville Elementary started as a 3-story building built in 1930. It was originally part of the Oakville School District before it was acquired by the Mehlville School District. The school feeds into Bernard Middle, and the student population is 368. The school mascot is the Lion

==== Point Elementary School ====
Point dates back to 1840, when Mrs. Katherine Burg dedicated a room in her Oakville farmhouse as a classroom. Despite the fact that the school has been rebuilt numerous times, it is said that the bell at the front of the school is preserved from the original building. Around 400 students attend Point. The school mascot is the Eagle, and it feeds into Oakville Middle.

==== Rogers Elementary School ====
Rogers Elementary, located in south Oakville near the confluence of the Mississippi and Meramec Rivers, opened in the fall of 1991 and was named for Dr. Robert E. Rogers, a former superintendent. The school mascot is the Bear, and the 432 students who attend Rogers will go on to Oakville Middle School.

==== Trautwein Elementary School ====
Trautwein opened in 1964. The school is located in Concord, adjacent to Washington Middle, and is home to 382 students. It is named after Henry Trautwein, a former teacher and principal. The school mascot is the Tiger, and the school feeds into the neighboring Washington Middle

==== Wohlwend Elementary School ====
Wohlwend was built in 1969. It is located in Oakville, adjacent to Oakville Middle, and was named after former State Representative Clarence J. Wohlwend. 419 students attend Wohlwend. The school mascot is the Wildcat, and it feeds into both Bernard Middle and Oakville Middle

==== MOSAIC ====
MOSAIC, often referred to as Mosaic Elementary School, is the newest school in the district. It is located in Mehlville and opened in 2017, though the building where it is housed opened back in the 19th century as St. John's School, and would later become the first building to house Mehlville High School. MOSAIC is an acronym for Mehlville and Oakville Students Achieve, Imagine and Create. The school offers "a unique learning experience that allows for increased student choice and personalized learning." The district provides bus transportation from each of the other elementaries to MOSAIC after the busses drop off the students at the schools. Due to this, it is the latest-starting school in the district. The school has a student population of around 250, making it by far the smallest "elementary school" in the district. Students come from all over the district, and because the school has no bus routes, it has no set middle school that MOSAIC feeds into. Students and their parents effectively get to choose which middle school they want to go to, based on where they live in the district and/or based on personal choice.

=== Middle schools ===
Middle schools in the Mehlville R-9 School District teach kids from 6th grade (11-12 y/o) to 8th grade (13-14 y/o).

The middle schools also host Academy, a personalized learning program based on STEM/STEAM principles. Academy is primarily designed for students who went through the MOSAIC program at Mosaic Elementary.

==== Bernard Middle School ====
Bernard is the newest middle school in the district, opening in 2003. It is located in North Oakville on the same property that once was home to Bernard Elementary School. Both schools are named after Emil Bernard, the first superintendent of the district. The school's mascot is the Patriot, and about 700 students attend, originating from 4 different elementary schools. Bernard feeds into both high schools; 70% will attend Oakville High School and 30% will attend Mehlville High School.

==== Margaret Buerkle Middle School ====
Margaret Buerkle Middle School opened in the fall of 1975. The school is located in Mehlville, and is named after former teacher and administrator Margaret Buerkle. 637 students attend MBMS, originating from 3 different elementary schools. The school's mascot is the Bobcat and it feeds into Mehlville High School.

==== Oakville Middle School ====
Oakville Middle School opened in 1962 and shares a campus with Wohlwend Elementary. About 700 students attend the school, originating from 3 different elementary schools. The school's mascot is the Spartan, and the school feeds until Oakville High School. Currently, Oakville Middle's eight grade academy is closed because not enough students signed up.

==== Washington Middle School ====
Washington Middle School, located in Concord, opened in 1951. It is the oldest middle school in the district and shares a campus with Trautwein Elementary. 458 students are currently enrolled, originating from 2 elementary schools, making Washington the smallest of the four middle schools in terms of student population. Their mascot is the Eagle, and the school feeds into Mehlville High School.

=== High schools ===
High schools teach kids from 9th Grade (14-15 y/o) to 12th grade (17-18 y/o)

Mehlville High School began the FLEX program in the 2022–23 school year, a similar experience to the academy program at the middle schools.

- Mehlville High School
- Oakville High School
- SCOPE/SSLCMS (Alternative School)

== Notes ==
- Schrappen, Colleen (April 18, 2005). "Class sizes in Mehlville District will increase Seven positions are being eliminated". St. Louis Post-Dispatch.
- Bell, Kim (November 3, 1988). "$8.5 million bond issue sought District would use money for more space, specialized rooms". St. Louis Post-Dispatch.
- Bell, Kim (June 8, 1988). "Bond issue fails in Mehlville District". St. Louis Post-Dispatch.
