= Oakville Township, St. Louis County, Missouri =

Township in St. Louis County, Missouri, U.S.

Coordinates: 38°26′57″N 90°19′0″W

Oakville Township is a township in St. Louis County, in the U.S. state of Missouri. Its population was 36,828 as of the 2010 census.
