= Tesson Ferry Township, St. Louis County, Missouri =

Township in the US state of Missouri

Coordinates: 38°29′34″N 90°22′38″W

Tesson Ferry Township is a township in St. Louis County, in the U.S. state of Missouri. Its population was 38,546 as of the 2010 census.
