= Concord Township, St. Louis County, Missouri =

Township in St. Louis County, Missouri, U.S.

Coordinates: 38°31′59″N 90°20′34″W

Concord Township is a township in St. Louis County, in the U.S. state of Missouri. Its population was 36,693 as of the 2010 census.
