= Lemay Township, St. Louis County, Missouri =

Township in St. Louis County, Missouri

Coordinates: 38°31′5″N 90°17′40″W

Lemay Township is a township in St. Louis County, in the U.S. state of Missouri. Its population was 34,736 as of the 2010 census.
