= Nkeiru Okoye =

American composer and musician

Nkeiru Okoye // (born July 18, 1972) is an American composer and musician. She has composed many works based on American history, including Harriet Tubman: When I Crossed That Line to Freedom, Invitation to a Die-In and "The Journey of Phillis Wheatley".

== Biography ==
Nkeiru Okoye was born on July 18, 1972, and grew up in New York. Her mother is African American and her father was Nigerian, a member of the Igbo ethnic group. During her childhood, she spent time in both the United States and Nigeria. Okoye learned to play piano at age 8 and began writing music at age 13. Okoye went to the Preparatory Division of the Manhattan School of Music. When her parents separated, Okoye and her older sister lived with their mother on Long Island. She attended Oberlin Conservatory of Music for her undergraduate work, graduating in 1993. She then went on to Rutgers University to study with her mentor, Noel Da Costa. For a premiere at Rutgers in 1999, she conducted her composition, "The Creation", with Danny Glover narrating key parts of the work.

== Work ==
Okoye penned Voices Shouting Out in 2002. It was commissioned by Maestro Wes Kenney and the Virginia Symphony Orchestra.

In 2005, Okoye collaborated with Carolivia Herron to write a narrated work for orchestra based on the life of Phillis Wheatley called The Journey of Phillis Wheatle. Okoye used some Ghanaian influence in the work.

In 2014, Okoye's Harriet Tubman: When I Crossed That Line to Freedom was premiered by American Opera Projects. The opera looks at the life of enslaved Africans living in plantations in the South, Harriet Tubman and the music of the time period. Okoye received a grant from the National Endowment for the Arts to help her complete the work. Her opera not only highlights the life of Tubman, but also of others such as William Still and Samuel Green. Okoye said about choosing Tubman as a subject: "I wanted to write an opera about a woman who did great things and survived." The opera includes her 2006 stand-alone song cycle, "Songs of Harriet Tubman".

Her work, Invitation to a Die-In (2017) was commissioned and premiered by conductor Ng Tian Hui and the Mount Holyoke Symphony Orchestra. A second performance was with the University City Symphony Orchestra in 2018. Invitation to a Die-In was a commission in memory of Trayvon Martin and other young black men who have lost their lives to violence. The text for Invitation was written by David Cote and the performance of the work includes percussion imitating gunshots and members of the orchestra falling over as if they had been hit.

For the 250th anniversary of the founding of Charlotte, North Carolina, the Charlotte Symphony Orchestra commissioned Okoye to write an orchestral work to commemorate the city's history. The piece, reflecting the diversity of the history of the city, is 12 minutes long and called Charlotte Mecklenburg. Charlotte Mecklenburg also holds a reference to a victim of police violence, with the percussion section of the work referencing Keith Lamont Scott. Find more on her work through the Theodore Presser.

She is currently on the Board of Advisors for Composers Now!.

=== Awards ===
In 2020, Okoye was the inaugural recipient of the Florence Price Award for Composition. Okoye was named a Guggenheim Fellow in 2021 for her works in musical composition. Okoye was named composer of the month in February 2024.
