= Leon Burke III =

American singer

- Occupations: Musician, singer, and conductor

Leon Burke III

Leon Burke III is an American musician, singer, and conductor from St. Louis, Missouri. He began his musical studies at age 12 and by age 16 was conducting orchestras.

== Personal life ==
Leon Burke III is a native St. Louisan, where he attended Mc Bride High School and John Burroughs School. He holds music degrees from the Oberlin Conservatory and the University of Kansas. Burke studied as a Fulbright Fellow in Paraguay.

Burke writes: "I was born in St. Louis into a family of teachers. My aunt was the first black woman to earn a doctorate from St. Louis University. She was a major influence in my life and introduced me to Martin Luther King Jr. when I was young. I began to dedicate my life to music when I began my music studies at age 12. My instruments were piano and organ but I also sang."

== Professional life ==
Burke is the music director and conductor of the University City Symphony Orchestra and assistant conductor of the Saint Louis Symphony Chorus. He conducts the Cadenza Orchestra of the Saint Charles County Youth Orchestra Program and is the music director of the Belleville Philharmonic Youth Orchestra. He is also the choir director at Eliot Unitarian Chapel in Kirkwood.

Outside of the St. Louis area, he is the conductor for the Metropolitan Ballet of Topeka, where he conducts The Nutcracker every December. Burke also conducted Amahl and the Night Visitors in Jefferson City, Missouri, during the 2008 holiday season. He teaches voice at East Central College in Union and St. Louis University. He conducts concerts most summers with the Asuncion Symphony (National Orchestra of Paraguay) where he is the principal guest conductor. While in Paraguay, he also works with the National Youth Orchestra. In Summer 2009, he performed concerts in Tucuman, Argentina.

Burke has served as conductor or music director of the Lawrence Chamber Players, the Hutchinson Symphony, the Alton Symphony Orchestra, and the McPherson Symphony. He has been on the faculties of Baker University, Sterling College, Hutchinson Community College, and Webster University.

Burke is an active member of Unitarian Universalists Musicians Network (UUMN). He served as a member of the UUA New Hymn Resource Task Force, which was appointed in the Fall of 2003 to create a new congregational hymn resource. Singing the Journey debuted at the 2005 UUA General Assembly to enthusiastic reviews.

Burke has won the Arts for Life Award for Best Achievement in Musical Direction for his work with Spotlight Theater's production of Titanic in 2003. Other productions with the Spotlight Theater (Chicago, Jekyll and Hyde, West Side Story) were honored with nominations for Best Musical Production, and two more nominations for Burke for Best Musical Director. All the nominated productions were performed at Marquette High School during the summers.

Leon Burke III is on the roster of cover conductors for the Saint Louis Symphony Orchestra. He made his SLSO concert conducting debut on February 21, 2009, leading the orchestra, the symphony's IN UNISON Chorus, and the University of Missouri-St. Louis Community Chorus as part of the Saint Louis Symphony Orchestra's annual Lift Every Voice: Black History Month Celebration concert. The second half of the concert featured A Tribute to Mae Wheeler.

== Education ==
- B.M., Composition, Oberlin Conservatory
- MM, University of Kansas
- DMA, Conducting, University of Kansas
- Fulbright Fellow, Paraguay

Leon Burke has also studied with Sir Georg Solti, Leonard Slatkin, Edo de Waart, and Jorge Mester.

== Current positions ==
- Music Director and Conductor – University City Symphony Orchestra
- Assistant Conductor – St. Louis Symphony Chorus
- Conductor – Cadenza Orchestra, St. Charles County Youth Orchestra (St. Charles, Missouri)
- Conductor – Metropolitan Ballet of Topeka
- Conductor – Belleville Philharmonic Youth Orchestra (Belleville, Illinois)
- Choir Director – Eliot Unitarian Chapel (Kirkwood, Missouri)
- Faculty (voice) – St. Louis University
- Adjunct Faculty (voice) – East Central College (Union, Missouri)
- Principal Guest Conductor – Asuncion Symphony (Paraguay)
- Cover Conductor – St. Louis Symphony Orchestra (St. Louis, Missouri)
