= John Burroughs School =

Private school in Ladue, Missouri, United States; founded 1923

Coordinates: 38.64444°N 90.36991°W

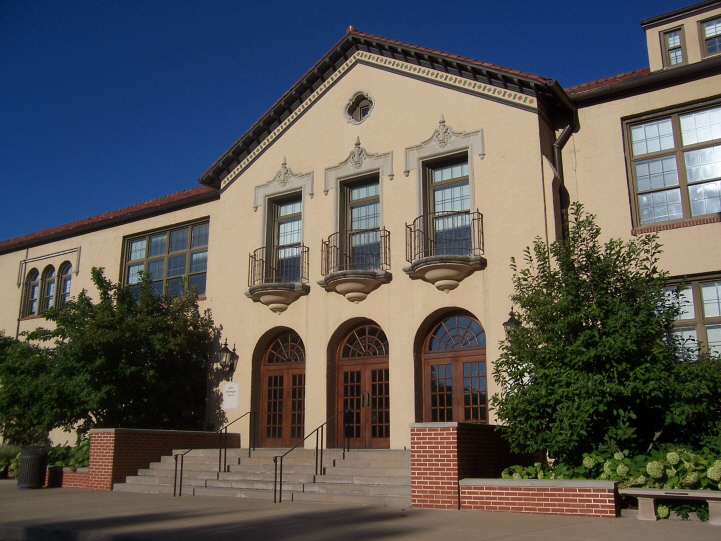

Location
- 755 South Price Road; Ladue, Missouri 63124; United States

Information
- Type: Private college-preparatory school
- Religious affiliation: Nonsectarian
- Established: 1923; 103 years ago
- Head of school: Andy Abbott
- Teaching staff: 116.0 (FTE) (2019–20)
- Grades: 7–12
- Gender: Co-ed
- Enrollment: 639 (2019–20)
- Student to teacher ratio: 5.5 (2019–20)
- Campus size: 49 acres (200,000 m^{2})
- Campus type: Suburban
- Colors: Blue and gold
- Athletics conference: Metro League
- Nickname: Bombers
- Rival: Mary Institute and St. Louis Country Day School
- Endowment: $70M
- Tuition: $31,240 (2021–22)
- Affiliation: National Association of Independent Schools
- Website: www.jburroughs.org

John Burroughs School (JBS) is a private, nonsectarian college-preparatory school with 631 students in grades 7–12. Its 49-acre (200,000 m^{2}) campus is located in Ladue, Missouri, a suburb of St. Louis. Founded in 1923, it is named for U.S. naturalist and philosopher John Burroughs.

As of 2020, the faculty includes 96 full-time and 32 part-time members. Since 2009, the head of school has been Andy Abbott, formerly an English teacher and the school's head of college counseling. He replaced Keith Shahan, who served as headmaster for 23 years.

== History ==
In 1922, a group of St. Louisans announced their intention to open a private school in a suburb of St. Louis. "This school is being established to meet a very definite demand for another country day school, and is an outgrowth of a condition whereby existing schools are unable to accept all pupils applying for entrance," the St. Louis Star and Times reported.

In "executive charge" of the campaign to build the school was Edna Fischel Gellhorn, a co-founder of the League of Women Voters. The 18-acre site, located on the streetcar line from Clayton, was purchased for $18,000 ($340,000 today) and the initial campus buildings, including a gymnasium, were built for $180,000. Tuition was $500 per year, with scholarships available to up to 10 percent of students.

Classes began on Oct. 2, 1923, ahead of a formal cornerstone-laying ceremony the following week. The gym was completed in December at a cost of $38,000; the main speaker at its dedication ceremony was Branch Rickey, manager of the St. Louis Cardinals baseball team.

The school's founders wrote, "Burroughs was established upon the conviction that each child has latent possibilities of power, and that it is the chief purpose of the school to cooperate with parents in discovering, fostering and developing that power so that in adulthood he shall make his contribution to the improvement of human society. The child's mind is not a tablet to be written upon or a cistern to be filled, but a living, growing entity to be guided, developed, trained and inspired."

In the 1930s, JBS participated in the Eight-Year Study, an experiment that tested how American progressive secondary schools would prepare their students for college when released from the curricular restrictions of college admissions requirements.

In April 2020, the school received $2.5 million in federally backed small business loans as part of the Paycheck Protection Program. The school received scrutiny over this loan, which was meant to protect small and private businesses, and returned the money to the Treasury Department the following month.

The school is fundraising to raise its endowment to $100 million by June 2026.

== Athletics ==
The Bombers football team won the state championship in Division 2A in 1975, 1980 (tie), 1985, 1989, 1991, 1992, 1995 (tie) and 2001; and won the 3A title in 2015. As of 2020, former NFL kicker Neil Rackers is an assistant coach. Former NFL quarterback Gus Frerotte was head football coach from 2011 to 2013. In 2016, the program was inducted into the Missouri Sports Hall of Fame.

In 2023, John Burroughs' varsity baseball team won the state championship.

== Notable alumni ==
=== Arts, sciences, and education ===
- Leon Burke III, musician, singer, and conductor
- David D. Clark, 1962: computer scientist and internet pioneer
- Sarah Clarke, 1989: actress
- Edward T. Foote II, 1955: university administrator
- Tom Friedman, 1983: conceptual artist
- Heather Goldenhersh, 1991: actress
- Jon Hamm, 1989: actor
- John Hartford, 1956: folk musician
- Terry Karl, 1966: professor of Latin American Studies
- Carrie Kemper, 2002; television writer
- Ellie Kemper, 1998: actress and Unbreakable Kimmy Schmidt.
- Peter Allison Larkin: author and director
- Lisa Miller, 1984: professor of clinical psychology, author
- James Peniston, 1992: sculptor
- Thomas H. Stix, 1941: plasma physics pioneer, professor
- Erinn Westbrook, 2006: actress
- Beau Willimon, 1995: playwright and screenwriter

=== Business ===
- Sam Altman, 2003: CEO of OpenAI
- Maureen Chiquet, 1981: former CEO of Chanel
- Joe Edwards, 1964: restaurateur
- Timothy Luehrman, 1974: finance professor
- Danny Meyer, 1976: NYC restaurateur
- Edward N. Ney, 1942: accountancy CEO of, U.S. ambassador to Canada.
- Andrew C. Taylor, 1966: businessperson

=== Government and politics ===
- Todd Akin, 1966: U.S. Congressman (R) for the 2nd District of Missouri (2001–2013)
- Brittany Packnett Cunningham, 2002: activist, police reformer
- Walter Metcalfe, 1956: attorney and civic leader in St. Louis
- Laura Stith, 1971: Chief Justice of the Missouri Supreme Court
- W. Stuart Symington IV, 1970: U.S. ambassador and career diplomat.
- John A. Terry: Judge of the District of Columbia Court of Appeals
- Andrea R. Wood, 1991: U.S. district judge of the United States District Court for the Northern District of Illinois.

=== Journalism and literature ===
- William S. Burroughs, 1932 (did not graduate): novelist
- Gabe Fleisher, 2020: journalist
- Martha Gellhorn, 1926: combat journalist, novelist
- Vicki Goldberg, 1954: novelist and photographer
- Jane Smiley, 1967: novelist
- Mary Wiltenburg, 1994: journalist, Little Bill Clinton project

=== Military ===
- James H. Howard, 1932: fighter pilot who flew with the Flying Tigers and later became the only fighter pilot in World War II's European Theater of Operations to receive the Medal of Honor.
- Roslyn L. Schulte, 2002: Killed in action on May 19, 2009, she became the first woman to receive the National Intelligence Medal for Valor.

=== Philanthropy ===
- Leo Drey, 1935: timber magnate, conservationist, philanthropist Leased land to JBS for outdoor education for one dollar a year.

=== Sports ===
- Jake Bain, 2018: football player, LGBTQ+ activist.
- Butch Buchholz, 1959: professional tennis player
- Fran Charles, 1986: television football reporter/host
- Ezekiel Elliott, 2013: NFL running back
- David Lee, class of 1997 (alum non-grad): professional basketball player
- Brandon Miller, 2020: middle-distance runner
- Foye Oluokun, 2013: NFL linebacker
- Dave Sisler, 1949: baseball player.
- Dick Sisler, 1938: baseball player.
- Scott Van Slyke, 2005: baseball player
- Jay Williamson, 1985: professional golfer

== Faculty ==
- Raymond Beckman, soccer player
- Ron Charles, book critic
- John L. Loos: historian

== See also ==
- Category:John Burroughs School alumni
