= Walter Metcalf =

Walter Metcalf may refer to:

- Walter Metcalf (footballer) (1910–1981), English football defender
- Walter Metcalf (chemist) (1918–2008), New Zealand physical chemist

== See also ==
- Walter Metcalfe (born 1938), American lawyer
