= The Great Rivers Greenway District =

Government agency for creating a greenway network in metro St. Louis, USA

Great Rivers Greenway
- Formation: November 2000 (26 years ago)
- Legal status: Missouri Political Subdivision
- Purpose: Develop a regional network of greenways
- Headquarters: 3745 Foundry Way, Suite 253
- Location: St. Louis, Missouri
- Leader: Mark Perkins, CEO
- Main organ: Metropolitan Park and Recreation District, doing business as Great Rivers Greenway
- Budget: $25.5 million (2021)
- Website: greatriversgreenway.org

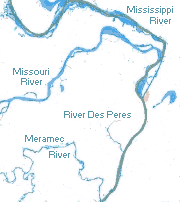
The rivers around St. Louis

The Great Rivers Greenway District is a public agency in the state of Missouri that works to develop a regional network of greenways, parks, and trails in the St. Louis metropolitan area. The agency engages citizens and community partners to plan, build, and care for the greenways.

== History ==
In 1996, a nonprofit organization called St. Louis 2004 was created with the aim of bringing about a renaissance in the region by 2004. It developed a list of 11 priorities, including developing a regional network of greenways.

In 2000, organization president Peter Sortino led a successful drive to place a proposition on local ballots to create a one-tenth-of-one-cent sales tax to support greenway development. In November of that year, voters in the City of St. Louis, St. Louis County, and St. Charles County approved Proposition C, also dubbed the Clean Water, Safe Parks and Community Trails Initiative. The tax enabled the creation of The Great Rivers Greenway District.

The agency's distribution of funds is governed by a board of directors whose members are appointed by the chief executives of the city and two counties. A chief executive officer and staff develop the River Ring, working with local, county, and state agencies and private and non-profit agencies throughout the St. Louis region.

In 2003, Great Rivers Greenway published "Building the River Ring: A Citizen-Driven Regional Plan", developed with advice from citizens, local governments, private companies, non-profit organizations and advocacy groups. The plan proposed to create the River Ring, a system of more than 40 greenways, parks, and trails comprising over 600 miles in St. Louis City, St. Louis County, and St. Charles County. The system will connect with trails developed by the Metro East Park and Recreation District of St. Clair and Madison Counties in Illinois. The concept was designed to raise awareness of the natural beauty found in the region's many rivers and streams and to reconnect residents to the city's primary natural feature: the confluence of the Mississippi and Missouri rivers.

In 2011 and 2016, Great Rivers Greenway engages citizens, civic leaders and partners to update and republish the Citizen-Driven Regional Plan. Pursuant to the 2016 update, a Great Rivers Greenway Foundation was formed to seek private funding for greenway projects.

By 2020, the agency had built more than 128 miles of greenways connecting parks, rivers, schools, neighborhoods, business districts and transit. The agency began surveying citizens about priorities to build and care for the greenways to inform the next update to the plan.

== Greenways ==
Greenways within the district:

- Boschert Greenway: The Boschert Greenway stretches from New Town in St. Charles through Fox Hill Park to the Missouri River near Historic Downtown St. Charles and the Katy Trail. A 30-foot flower sculpture, “Blomstre” – the Norwegian word for Bloom – stands at the intersection of Mel Wetter Parkway and the Little Hills Expressway. The sculpture was created by artist Andrew Andrasko from old bicycle parts.

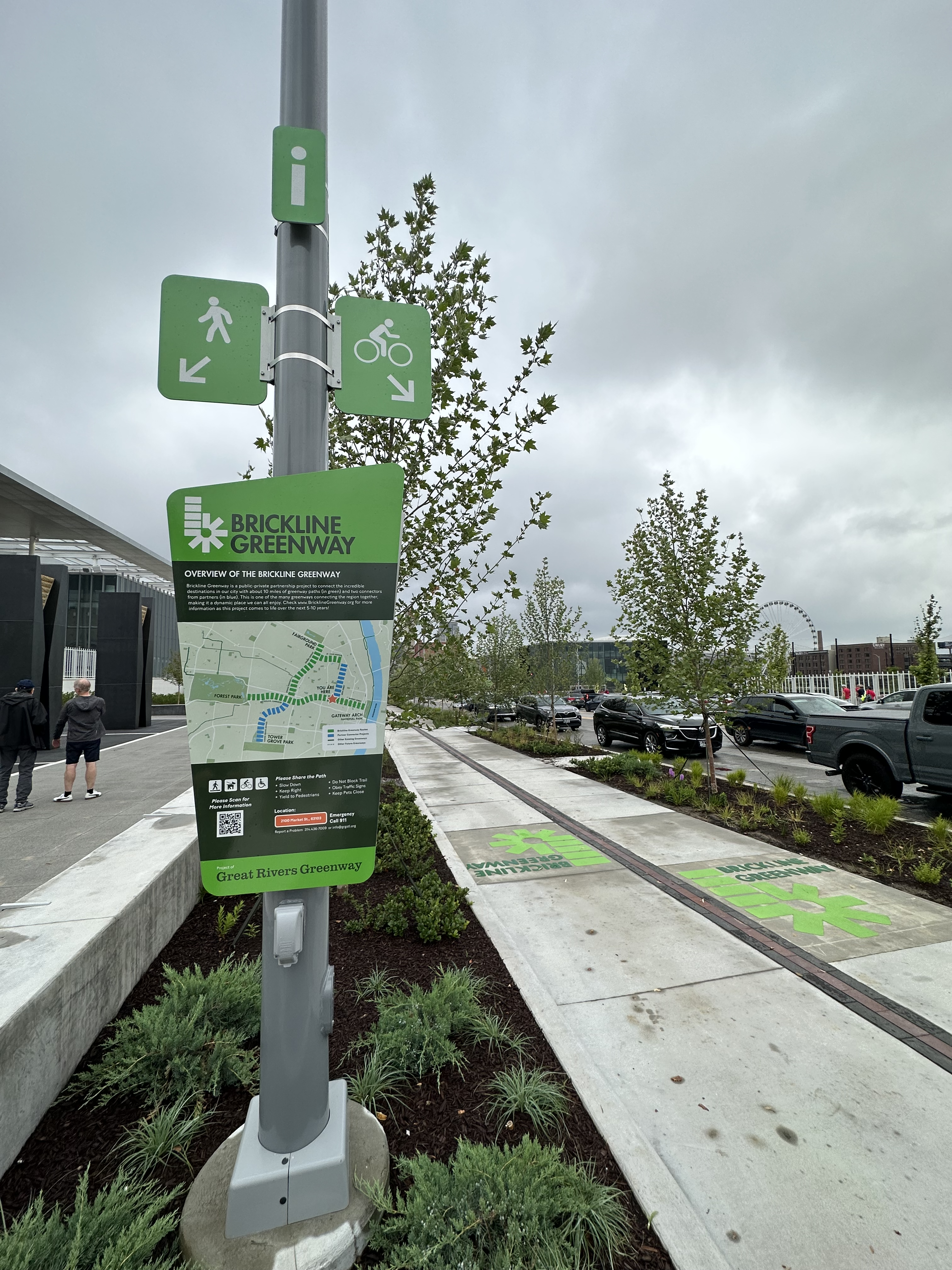
Signage near a completed portion of the Brickline Greenway along Market Street in 2023

- Brickline Greenway: The plan for the Brickline Greenway, formerly known as the Chouteau Greenway, calls for 20 miles of trails and green space connecting 17 neighborhoods across the City of St. Louis. It will connect Fairground Park in the north to Tower Grove Park in the south and Forest Park in the west to Gateway Arch National Park in the east. The project planners aim to knit together diverse communities through the greenway to overcome barriers that have fragmented the city over time. The plan incorporates input from citizens on strategies to promote economic growth and equitable outcomes.
- Busch Greenway: The Busch Greenway in St. Charles County connects the Katy Trail to Missouri Research Park and August A. Busch Memorial Conservation Area.
- Centennial Greenway: The Centennial Greenway will extend from Forest Park in the city of St. Louis to St. Charles County. Three sections have been completed. From Forest Park, the trail runs through the Washington University campus to Delmar Boulevard and Vernon Avenue in University City. Another section extends from Shaw Park in Clayton north to Olive Boulevard. A third section goes from the Katy Trail to the St. Charles Heritage Museum and connects east across the Missouri River to Creve Coeur Lake Memorial Park via the Creve Coeur Connector Trail.
- Dardenne Greenway - The Dardenne Greenway follows Dardenne Creek across St. Charles County. One section loops through the BaratHaven community and a restored prairie landscape in Dardenne Prairie. Another links Legacy Park in Cottleville to St. Charles Community College and Dardenne Park in St. Peters.
- Deer Creek Greenway - The Deer Creek Greenway extends from Deer Creek Park in Maplewood to Lorraine Davis Park in Webster Groves.
- Fee Fee Greenway - The Fee Fee Greenway extends from the Maryland Heights Recreation Complex to Creve Coeur Lake Memorial Park.
- Gravois Greenway: Grant's Trail - Grant's Trail on the Gravois Greenway runs along Gravois Creek on the rail corridor of the former Kirkwood-Carondelet branch of the Missouri Pacific Railroad. Trailnet, a St. Louis-based organization that advocates for active communities and safe spaces for walking and bicycling, purchased the corridor in 1991 and built the first six miles of Grant's Trail which opened in 1994. Since 2006, Great Rivers Greenway has extended the trail to reach 10 miles from Kirkwood to the River des Peres Greenway near Interstate 55 and added two miles of trail in Officer Blake C. Snyder Memorial Park, adjacent to Grant's Trail. Points of interest on the greenway include the Ulysses S. Grant National Historic Site, Grant's Farm and the Thomas Sappington House Museum.
- Maline Greenway: The Maline Greenway connects with other paved trails in Bella Fontaine County Park in north St. Louis County. It is the first segment of a planned seven mile, east–west link that will connect the Mississippi and St. Vincent Greenways.
- Meramec Greenway: The Meramec River Greenway Concept Plan calls for a greenway stretching 50 river miles from the City of Pacific to the Meramec's confluence with the Mississippi River. Five sections have been completed. The westernmost section connects Lions Park in Eureka to Route 66 State Park. The next section runs along the river on the Al Foster Trail between Glencoe and Sherman Beach County Park with a spur on the Rock Hollow Trail. A third section links Arnold's Grove Park in Valley Park to Simpson County Park and Greentree Park in Kirkwood. In Fenton the greenway connects Unger Park to Fenton City Park and George Winter Park. The fifth segment meanders through the river bottomland in Lower Meramec Park.
- Mississippi Greenway: The Mississippi Greenway, formerly known as the Confluence Greenway, is planned as a 32-mile corridor that will connect with the Missouri, Maline, River des Peres and Meramec Greenways. Three sections have been built. The Riverfront Trail runs from the downtown Mississippi riverfront north to the old Chain of Rocks Bridge. At 5,353 feet long, the old Chain of Rocks Bridge was part of Route 66 in 1936 and is one of the world's longest bicycle and pedestrian bridges. Another segment connects Jefferson Barracks County Park with River City Casino near the River des Peres Greenway. A third section runs through Cliff Cave County Park overlooking the Mississippi River.
- Missouri Greenway: The master plan for the Missouri Greenway is a 55 river mile corridor from the confluence of the Mississippi and Missouri Rivers to Chesterfield that will connect with the Mississippi, Sunset, Centennial, Fee Fee and Western Greenways. Three sections have been built. One runs from Riverwoods Park in Bridgeton along the Earth City Levee to the Discovery Bridge on Missouri Route 370 where a protected pedestrian and bike path connects with the Katy Trail. In Chesterfield, the greenway runs along the Monarch Chesterfield Levee Trail and connects to the Katy Trail on a protected path on the Daniel Boone Bridge. A third segment in Hazelwood runs through Truman Park.
- River des Peres Greenway: The River des Peres Greenway plan calls for a 11-mile corridor from Forest Park to the Mississippi River. Currently it runs from Francis R. Slay Park in the City of St. Louis past the Shrewsbury/Lansdowne MetroLink station to Carondelet Park and Lemay Park and connects to the Gravois Greenway: Grant's Trail.
- St. Vincent Greenway: the St. Vincent Greenway will extend seven miles from the North Hanley MetroLink station through the University of Missouri–St. Louis (UMSL) campus to Forest Park. Two sections have been completed. The north section runs from the North Hanley station through the UMSL campus and St. Vincent County Park. The south section connects Trojan Park through Ruth Porter Mall Park to Forest Park.
- Sunset Greenway: The Sunset Greenway in north St. Louis County runs from the Old St. Ferdinand Shrine in the historic district of Florissant through St. Ferdinand Park to Sunset Park on the Missouri River.
- Western Greenway: The Western Greenway runs from the Meramec Greenway at Glencoe to Rockwoods Reservation. The master plan is to extend the greenway to connect with Babler State Park and the Missouri Greenway in west St. Louis County.

== CityArchRiver Project ==
In 2007, four decades after completion of the Gateway Arch, the site remained an island, severed from the rest of the city by busy highways and disconnected from the Mississippi River. Walter Metcalfe, an attorney and civic leader in St. Louis, led the formation of CityArchRiver2015 Foundation in 2009 to transform the St. Louis Riverfront and Arch grounds. Michael Van Valkenburgh Associates of New York won an international competition to redesign the Arch grounds in 2010. The project received $20 million in capital funding in 2011 from the U.S. Department of Transportation, a $25 million matching grant from the Missouri Department of Transportation and $10 million in private donations raised by CityArchRiver. With a total project cost of $380 million, more funding was needed.

Great Rivers Greenway joined the effort in 2012, becoming part of a public-private partnership with the CityArchRiver2015 Foundation, National Park Service, Missouri Department of Transportation, Bi-State Development, and Jefferson National Parks Association. The partners planned a ballot issue known as Proposition P to generate sales tax revenue for the CityArchRiver project and other park improvements.

In April 2013 voters in the City of St. Louis and St. Louis County approved Proposition P: The Safe and Accessible Arch and Public Parks Initiative. The proposition authorized a 3/16th-cent sales tax to fund the CityArchRiver project and accelerate local park and greenway construction. The tax was projected to generate $780 million over the next 20 years, with 60 percent going to Great Rivers Greenway and 40 percent going to support local parks in St. Louis City and County. Half of the Great Rivers Greenway revenue supported the CityArchRiver project and the other half would be used to accelerate greenway construction. Great Rivers Greenway stewarded $85 million in Proposition P funds to complete several major projects over the next five years:

- The Park Over the Highway, a land bridge over the I-44 and I-70 highways, connected downtown St. Louis from Luther Ely Smith Square to the Arch grounds and the riverfront, making it easy and safe for people to travel through the area on foot or by bike.
- Luther Ely Smith Square, a green space leading to the Park Over the Highway was renovated.
- The Riverfront Trail on the Mississippi Greenway was extended 1.5 miles from Biddle Street south to Chouteau Avenue along Leonor K. Sullivan Boulevard and the boulevard was raised by 2.5 feet to reduce flooding.
- The North Gateway, a new recreation and event space at the north entrance to the Arch grounds, opened with a natural amphitheater, a bike and pedestrian path to Laclede's Landing, shaded lawns, a children's garden and an elevated walkway offering views of the Gateway Arch and the historic Eads Bridge.
- The Arch grounds were transformed with sustainable ponds, landscaping and accessible walkways connecting the Gateway Arch to the Mississippi River.
- Kiener Plaza was redesigned to serve as a public gathering place with a playground, fountains, an interactive splash pad, a grassy concert area, shade gardens, landscaping, and bicycle parking.
- The Gateway Arch National Park Museum and Visitor Center was renovated and expanded.
- Renovation of the Old Courthouse was planned to enhance the visitor experience and accessibility. Work was scheduled to begin in late 2021.

CityArchRiver Foundation changed its name to the Gateway Arch Park Foundation in 2017. The Foundation raised $250 million in private funds for the project.
