= Scott Van Slyke =

American baseball player (born 1986)

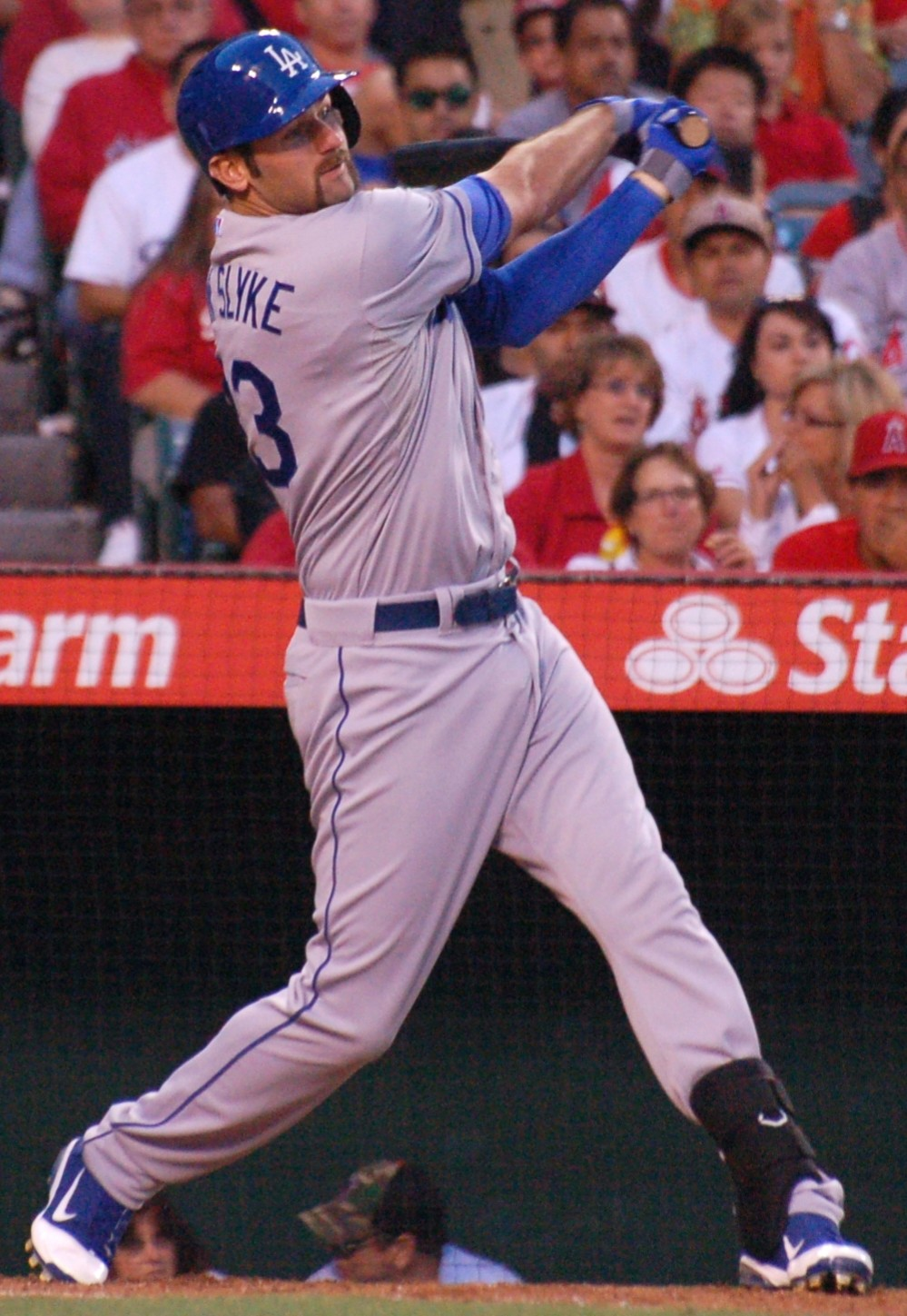
- Van Slyke with the Los Angeles Dodgers
- Outfielder / First baseman
- Born: July 24, 1986 (age 40); Chesterfield, Missouri, U.S.
- Batted: Right Threw: Right

Professional debut
- MLB: May 9, 2012, for the Los Angeles Dodgers
- KBO: July 8, 2018, for the Doosan Bears

Last appearance
- MLB: July 6, 2017, for the Los Angeles Dodgers
- KBO: August 15, 2018, for the Doosan Bears

MLB statistics
- Batting average: .242
- Home runs: 29
- Runs batted in: 95

KBO statistics
- Batting average: .128
- Home runs: 1
- Runs batted in: 4
- Stats at Baseball Reference

Teams
- Los Angeles Dodgers (2012–2017); Doosan Bears (2018)

Scott Tyler Van Slyke (born July 24, 1986) is an American former professional baseball outfielder and first baseman. He played in Major League Baseball (MLB) for the Los Angeles Dodgers and in the KBO League for the Doosan Bears.

The son of All-Star outfielder Andy Van Slyke, he was selected by the Los Angeles Dodgers in the 14th round of the 2005 MLB draft out of John Burroughs School in Missouri.

== Early life ==
Scott Van Slyke was born on July 24, 1986, in Chesterfield, Missouri, to Andy and Lauri Van Slyke. He is of Dutch ancestry and grew up in St. Louis, where his father, Andy, played with the St. Louis Cardinals from 1983 to 1986. Scott is the second of four children; his older brother, A. J., played in the Cardinals' minor league system from 2005 to 2008. At the age of seven, he rescued his three-year-old brother Jared from drowning in a hot tub near the Pittsburgh Pirates' spring training camp in Bradenton, Florida.

Van Slyke began playing baseball at age five. He attended John Burroughs School in Ladue, Missouri, where he was named Missouri Gatorade Player of the Year in 2005.

== Professional career ==
=== Draft and minor leagues ===
Van Slyke was drafted by the Los Angeles Dodgers in the 14th round of the 2005 amateur draft. Van Slyke made his professional debut with the Gulf Coast Dodgers in 2005, appearing in 24 games and hitting .282.

Van Slyke played for the Ogden Raptors in 2006, the Great Lakes Loons in 2007 and 2008 and the Inland Empire 66ers of San Bernardino in 2008–09 before he was promoted to the AAA Albuquerque Isotopes at the end of the 2009 season. He was named to the California League Post-season All-Star team in 2009. He began 2010 with the Chattanooga Lookouts in the Double-A Southern League, and again returned to Albuquerque to finish the season.

He started 2011 with Chattanooga, where he began spending more time at first base. He was selected to the mid-season All-Star game, and won the MVP award in the game. He was later also selected as a post-season all-star. In 130 games, he hit .348 with 20 home runs and 92 RBI. He led the Southern League in batting average for the 2011 season, and was selected as the Dodgers "Minor League Player of the Year". He was added to the Dodgers' 40-man roster after the season.

=== Los Angeles Dodgers (2012–2017) ===
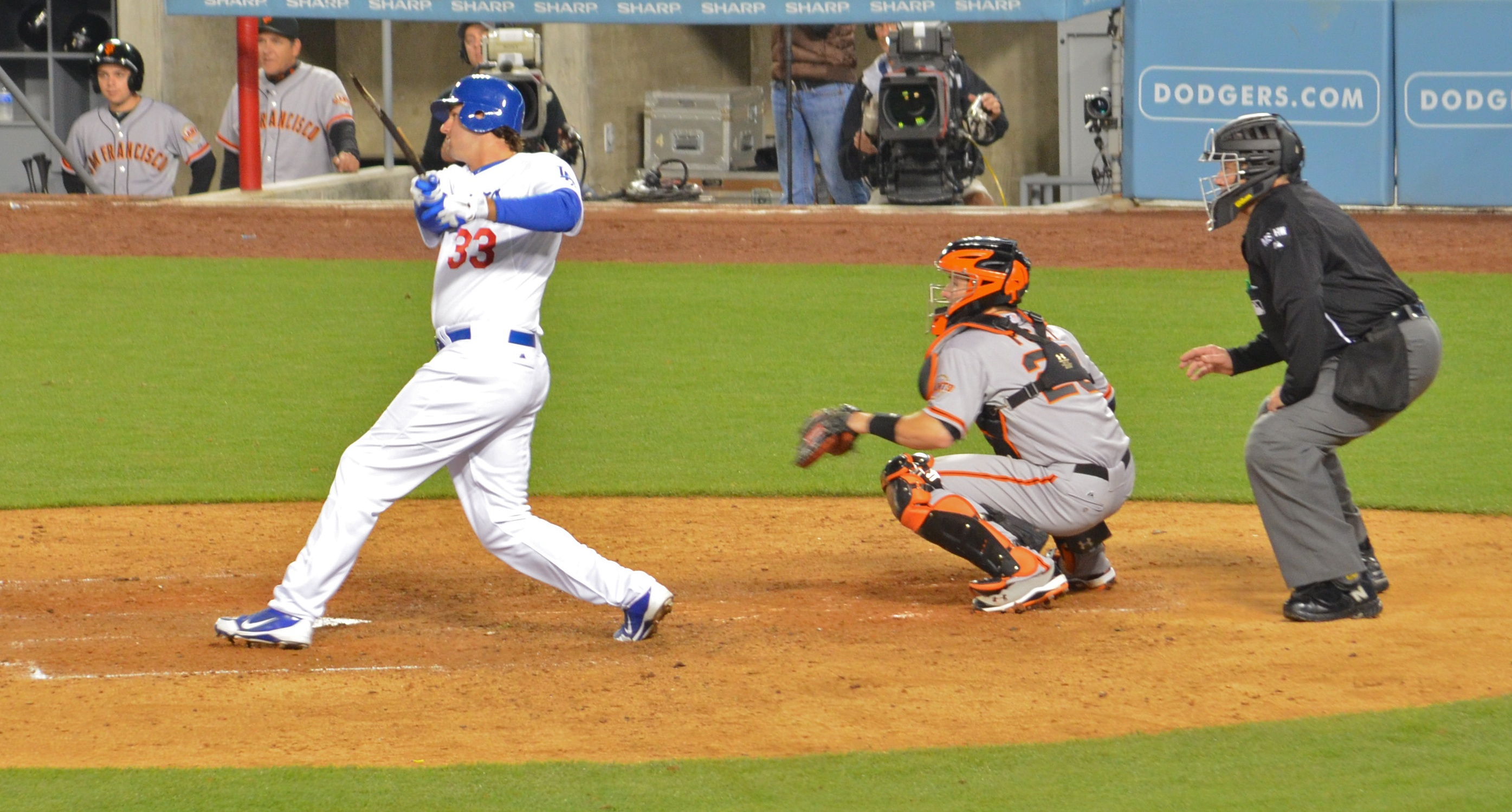
Van Slyke in his debut with Dodgers

Van Slyke was called up to the Dodgers on May 9, 2012. He made his debut that night as a pinch hitter and recorded an RBI single in his first at-bat. He was the first Dodger to get a pinch RBI in his first at-bat since Carl Warwick on April 11, 1961. Van Slyke hit his first Major League home run on May 20, 2012, as a pinch hitter against St. Louis Cardinals pitcher Marc Rzepczynski when he was given the green light to swing on a 3–0 count. The three-run home run gave the Dodgers the game-winning 6–5 lead.

On June 1, 2012, Van Slyke was part of a record-setting Dodgers lineup that featured the sons of five former Major Leaguers (along with Tony Gwynn Jr., Iván DeJesús Jr., Dee Gordon, and Jerry Hairston Jr.). This was the first time in Major League history this had ever occurred and was also the first time for a starting infield of four major league sons: first baseman Van Slyke, second baseman Hairston, third baseman De Jesus and shortstop Gordon. He played in a total of 27 games with the Dodgers and hit .167 with 2 home runs. In 95 games with Albuquerque, he hit .327 with 18 homers and 67 RBI. After the conclusion of the AAA season, he played with the Tiburones de La Guaira in the Venezuelan Winter League.

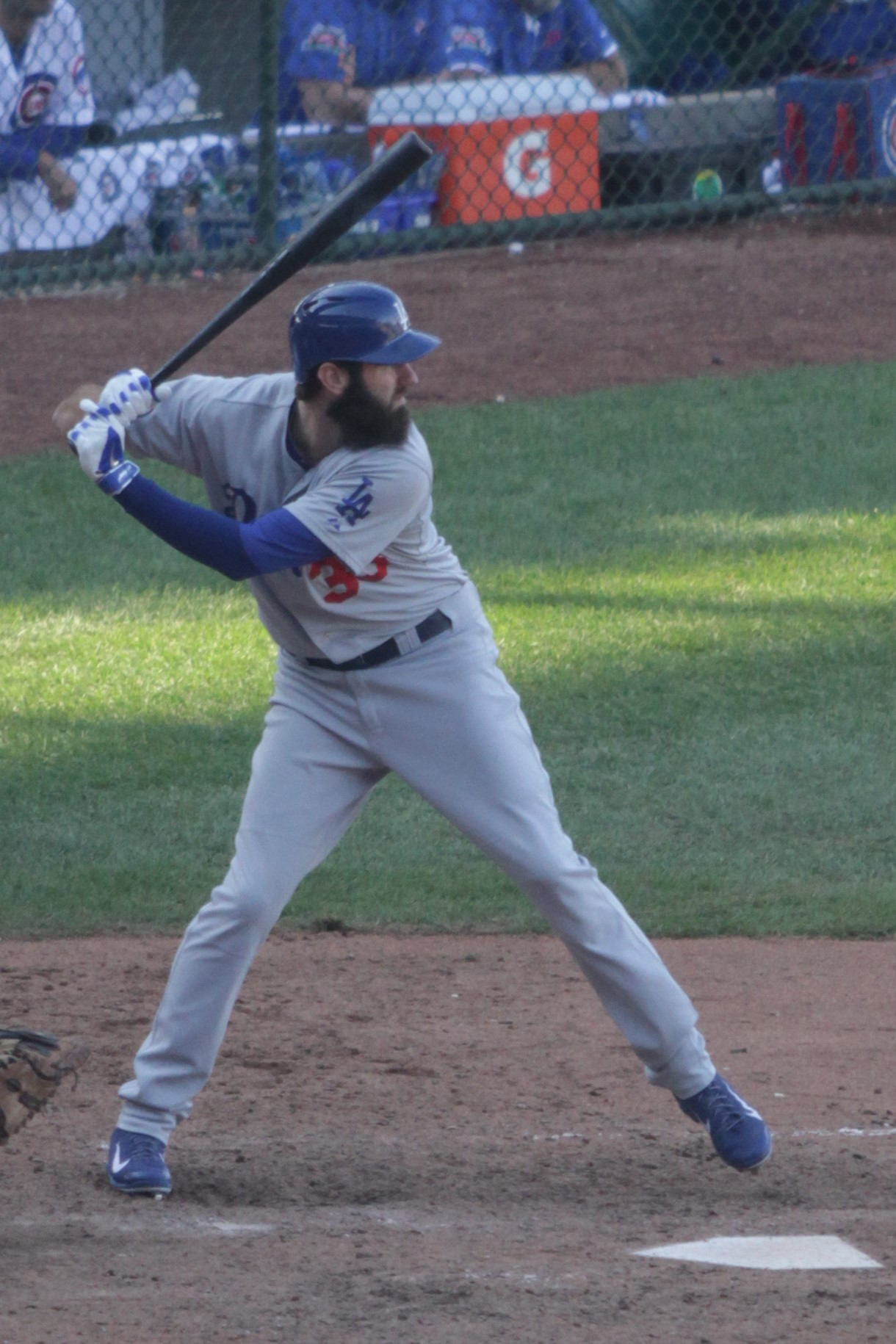
Van Slyke batting

Van Slyke was designated for assignment on December 12, 2012, and removed from the 40-man roster. With Albuquerque at the start of 2013, he hit .397 with 9 homers and 30 RBI in 34 games.

The Dodgers purchased his contract on May 10, 2013, and brought him back up to the Majors. He wound up splitting time between Albuquerque and Los Angeles the rest of the season. With the Dodgers, he hit .240 with 7 home runs and 19 RBI. His biggest moment was a pinch-hit walk-off home run against the Arizona Diamondbacks on September 10.

In 2014, Van Slyke was a backup in a crowded Dodgers outfield that also included Yasiel Puig, Andre Ethier, Matt Kemp, and Carl Crawford. He regularly started against left-handed pitching in a platoon role, first with Ethier and later with Crawford. Van Slyke finished the 2014 regular season hitting .297, with 8 home runs and 29 RBIs in 98 games. He led the team in slugging percentage and on-base plus slugging.

In 2015, he hit .239/.317/.383 in 96 games with six homers and 30 RBI. He battled left mid-back and right wrist issues for much of the season, which negatively affected his performance. Following the season, he agreed to a one-year, $1.225 million contract with the Dodgers for 2016, avoiding salary arbitration.

Van Slyke again struggled with injuries in 2016 and played in just 52 games, hitting .225./.292/.314 with one home run and seven RBI. A back injury hampered him at the start of the season, and his right wrist injury recurred, ending his season in early August. In late August, he underwent arthroscopic surgery on his wrist in order to resolve the issue. On December 1, 2016, he signed a one-year, $1.325 million contract with the Dodgers to avoid arbitration and remain with the team for 2017.

=== Cincinnati Reds ===
Van Slyke was traded to the Cincinnati Reds, along with minor league catcher Hendrik Clementina in exchange for Tony Cingrani on July 31, 2017. On August 9, 2017, he was designated for assignment by the Reds.

=== Miami Marlins ===
On January 13, 2018, Van Slyke signed a minor league contract with the Miami Marlins.

=== Doosan Bears (2018) ===
On June 26, 2018, he signed with the Doosan Bears of the KBO League. He was released on September 20, 2018.

=== Acereros de Monclova ===
On July 9, 2021, after several years out of professional baseball, Van Slyke signed with the Acereros de Monclova of the Mexican League. He became a free agent after the 2021 season without appearing in a game.

== Personal life ==
Van Slyke and his wife, Audrey, are Christian and are active in Bible study groups. They have one son, Jackson.

== See also ==
- List of second-generation Major League Baseball players
