= Gateway Festival Orchestra =

The Gateway Festival Orchestra is a seasonal orchestra based in St. Louis, Missouri. It usually performs four concerts each summer on Sunday evenings on the campus of Washington University in St. Louis.

== History ==
The Gateway Festival Orchestra was founded in 1964 by Professor William Schatzkamer of Washington University along with members of the St. Louis Symphony Orchestra and community leaders. The orchestra performed its first concerts on the levee of the Mississippi River. It began performing on the Brookings Quadrangle at Washington University in 1970.

Due to construction on the Quadrangle, it performed in Washington University's 560 Music Center for the 2019 season. Due to the pandemic, there were no concerts in 2020. In 2021, there were 3 concerts at St. Louis Music Park at Centene Community Ice Center and one at Chesterfield Amphitheater. The orchestra's board of directors planned concerts for the summer of 2022 in a variety of locations.

The GFO is an ensemble of paid instrumentalists. Its concerts are free to the public.

== Music Directors ==
The orchestra's first music director William Schatzkamer, who was trained at the Juilliard School of Music. He was a piano student of Alexander Siloti. Over his storied career performing, he performed a total of 175 concerts and recitals and recorded with RCA Victor. He served on the music faculty of Washington University between 1951 and 1987.

The orchestra's second music director was Dr. James Richards, Professor of Orchestral Studies at the University of Missouri–St. Louis. He was trained at the Eastman School of Music. Richards retired at the end of the 2018 season.

The orchestra's current music director is Darwin Aquino, a native of the Dominican Republic. He has a master's degree in Music for orchestral conducting from Florida International University, and has conducted numerous orchestras in Europe and the Americas.
