= Grant's Trail =

Mixed-use trail in Missouri, United States

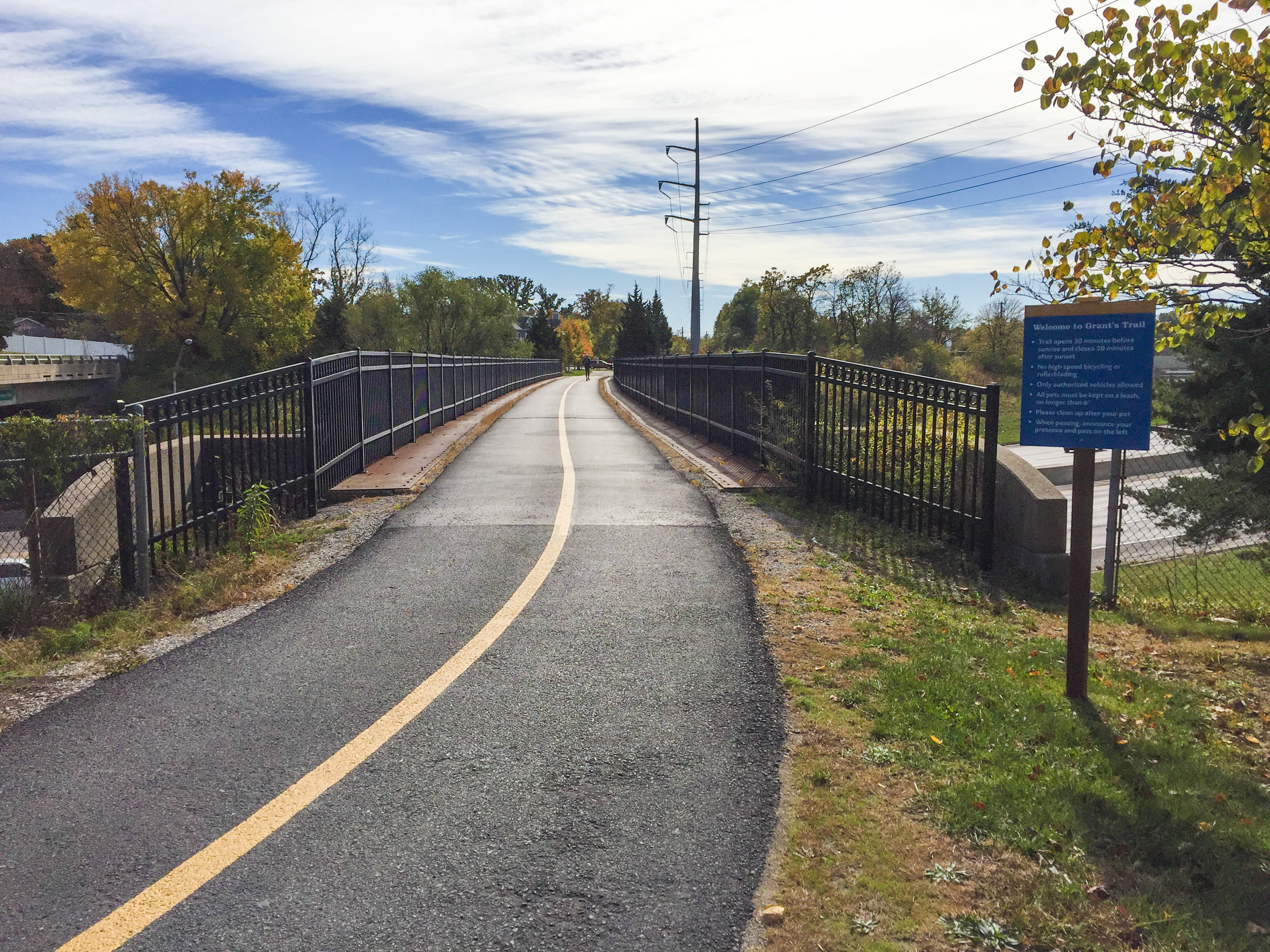
- Grant's Trail at the Kirkwood Trailhead, 2017
- Length: 8.25 miles (13.28 km)
- Location: St. Louis County, Missouri
- Use: Walking, biking, running
- Sights: Ulysses S. Grant National Historic Site; Grant's Farm
- Surface: Asphalt
- Website: http://www.greatriversgreenway.org/trails/grants-trail.aspx

Grant's Trail is a mixed-use trail in St. Louis County, Missouri, that begins at the River Des Peres Greenway at River City Boulevard and I-55 and runs northwest to Holmes Ave and I-44 in Kirkwood. The trail is 12.14 miles (19.54 km) and is part of the Gravois Greenway. It connects the Meramec River Greenway to the River des Peres Greenway.

== Location ==
- Kirkwood (western) trailhead: 38°34′20″N 90°23′30″W
- St. Louis (eastern) trailhead: 38°32′31″N 90°17′54″W
- St. Louis (eastern) terminus: 38°33′04″N 90°16′14″W

== See also ==
- The Great Rivers Greenway District
