= Walter Gellhorn =

American legal scholar (1906–1995)

- Born: Walter Fischel Gellhorn; September 18, 1906; St. Louis, Missouri, U.S.
- Died: December 9, 1995 (aged 89); Morningside Heights, Manhattan, U.S.
- Education: Amherst College; Columbia University
- Occupations: legal scholar and professor
- Spouse: Kitty Minus (m. 1932)
- Children: 2 daughters
- Mother: Edna Fischel Gellhorn
- Family: Martha Gellhorn (sister)

Walter Fischel Gellhorn (September 18, 1906 – December 9, 1995) was an American legal scholar and professor.

== Life and career ==
Gellhorn was born in St. Louis, Missouri on September 18, 1906 to suffragist Edna Fischel Gellhorn and George Gellhorn. His sister was the war correspondent and novelist Martha Gellhorn, and his younger brother Alfred was an oncologist and dean of the University of Pennsylvania School of Medicine. He graduated with a Bachelor of Arts from Amherst College in 1927, and graduated with a Bachelor of Laws from Columbia Law School in 1931. He served as judicial clerk to then-Justice Harlan F. Stone from 1931 to 1932, and was admitted to the bar of New York in 1932. On June 1, 1932, he married Kitty Minus.

From 1932 to 1933, he served as an attorney in the Office of the Solicitor General in the United States Department of Justice. In 1933, he left that position and became an assistant professor at Columbia Law School. He became associate professor in 1938. From 1936 to 1938 he was the New York regional attorney for the Social Security Board. On January 15, 1942, he joined the Office of Price Administration (OPA) as assistant general counsel and chief attorney of the New York regional staff. He resigned from the OPA on September 11, 1943.

Gellhorn was awarded a Doctor of Humane Letters degree from Amherst in 1951 and an honorary Legum Doctor degree from the University of Pennsylvania in 1963. He was president of the Association of American Law Schools in 1963.

In 1945 Gellhorn became professor, and in 1957 he became Betts Professor of Law. He was elected to the American Academy of Arts and Sciences in 1961 and the American Philosophical Society in 1965. In 1973 he became the first professor of the Columbia Law School to be named University Professor, Columbia University's highest academic rank, which only three professors in the university had achieved at the time. In 1975, Gellhorn retired to emeritus status, and the May 1975 issue of the Columbia Law Review was dedicated to him, with articles praising him written by Michael I. Sovern, Harry W. Jones, Harold Leventhal, Erwin N. Griswold, and Jack Greenberg. He served on the Administrative Conference of the United States from 1968 until his death, and was honored at the evening reception at its June 1988 plenary session. The reception's co-hosts, chairman Marshall J. Breger and Justice Antonin Scalia, both praised Gellhorn, with Scalia calling him "one of the giants of administrative law" and Breger saying he had "earned the respect of all of us who have been privileged to have known him and served with him".

He died on December 9, 1995, at his home in Morningside Heights, Manhattan. He was survived by his wife; his two daughters, Ellis and Gay; and his three grandchildren. The April 1996 issue of the Columbia Law Review contained articles praising him by Clark Byse, Warner W. Gardner, Louis Lusky, and Peter L. Strauss.

== See also ==
- List of law clerks for the ninth seat of the Supreme Court of the United States
