= Edna Fischel Gellhorn =

American suffragist (1878–1970)

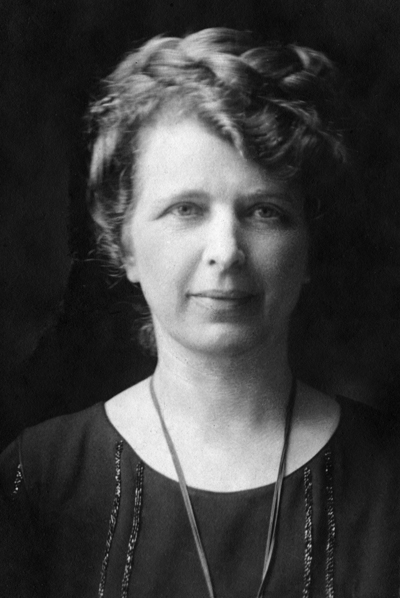
- Born: Edna Fischel; December 18, 1878; St. Louis, Missouri, United States
- Died: September 24, 1970 (aged 91); St. Louis, Missouri, United States
- Education: Bryn Mawr College
- Occupations: Suffragist; Social reformer
- Known for: Co-founding the National League of Women Voters
- Children: Walter Gellhorn; Martha Gellhorn

Edna Fischel Gellhorn (December 18, 1878 – September 24, 1970) was an American suffragist and reformer who helped found the League of Women Voters.

== Early life ==
Edna Fischel Gellhorn was born on December 18, 1878, in St. Louis, Missouri. Her father taught clinical medicine as a professor at Washington University School of Medicine and helped co-found the Barnard Free Skin and Cancer Hospital. Her mother was Martha Ellis Fischel. Both parents were involved in the Ethical Culture Society of St. Louis. Influenced by her parents, Fischel was involved in the community and dedicated her time to civic work. She attended the Mary Institute and Bryn Mawr College. She served as student president at each school. Upon graduating from Bryn Mawr in 1900, Fischel was elected lifetime president of her class.

== Work for women's rights ==
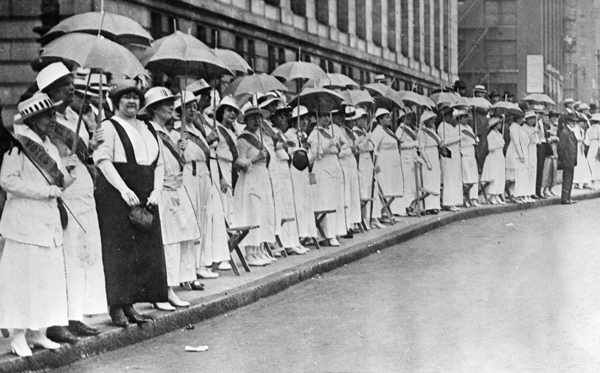
The Golden Lane

Gellhorn was an officer in both the St. Louis and Missouri State Equal Suffrage Leagues from 1910 until the Nineteenth Amendment was passed in 1919.

In 1916, she participated in a women's rights protest dubbed "The Golden Lane" at the Democratic Party's national convention, held that year in St. Louis. Some 7,000 women carrying yellow parasols and wearing yellow sashes lined both sides of the road leading to the St. Louis Coliseum. In the front row were two little girls, Mary Taussig and Martha Gellhorn (Gellhorn's daughter), representing future voters. A black-cloth-draped tableau of "states with no votes for women" was placed in front of the St. Louis Art Museum.

In 1920, Gellhorn became one of the founders of the National League of Women Voters. She declined Carrie Chapman Catt's invitation to become the organization's president, but served instead as vice-president, as a member of its board of directors, and as president of the St. Louis League for three terms. She also served as the first president of the Missouri League of Women Voters. She was elected to the League's state and national Rolls of Honor.

== Other reform efforts ==
Gellhorn co-founded and worked for the United Nations Association, the National Municipal League, and the American Association of University Women, and she was the regional director of the food rationing programs during World War I.

Gellhorn supported racial equality. In 1919, she cast the deciding vote in a vote held by the St. Louis League of Women Voters that would allow African-American women to serve on the board. Just two years later, Gellhorn, along with the rest of the League, left the Advisory Board, a collective of St. Louis women's organizations, because the organization would not allow African-American women.

In 1923, she helped found John Burroughs School in suburban Ladue, Missouri.

In 1923, the St. Louis Post-Dispatch wrote of Edna Gellhorn that she "is known as one of the foremost leaders of the movement in this country. It is in her gift of oratory, infectious enthusiasm, and great dramatic gifts, through which she is able to convert others to her convictions, that she is most effective in any cause with which she is identified, no executive or organizational abilities are not less marked".

== Death and legacy ==
In 1968, Washington University in St. Louis created the Edna Fischel Gellhorn Professorship of Public Affairs. At age 79, Gellhorn was selected as Woman of Achievement by the St. Louis Globe-Democrat.

She died in St. Louis in 1970.

Her papers are held in the collection of Washington University in St. Louis.

Edna Fischel Gellhorn's daughter, Martha Gellhorn, was a war reporter.[2]
