= Jake Bain =

American social worker, LGBTQ+ activist, and former college football player

- Born: 1999 (age 26–27); St. Louis
- Occupations: Social worker, activist, former college football player

Jake Bain (born 1999) is an American social worker, activist, and former college football player. He rose to national attention when he publicly came out as gay during a school assembly at his junior year of high school. He then attended Indiana State University, where he started as a football player, but left football after his first year. He is now a social worker.

== Biography ==
Bain was born and raised in St. Louis, Missouri, to a white mother and a Black father. His parents divorced when he was two. From a young age, he was engaged in football: his grandfather was the John Burroughs School's head football coach for many years, and both of his older brothers also played football. He was a football player in high school at John Burroughs, becoming team captain, and became seen as a top prospect for college recruitment. During his tenure, his high school won the state championship. During his high school years, he struggled with his sexuality, throwing himself into a persona, but ultimately began a relationship with another man.

During his junior year of high school, however, he came out publicly as gay during a thirteen-minute speech at the school assembly. His classmates and coach were supportive. However, after this, he faced the withdrawing of many of the recruiters. He also faced protests from the Westboro Baptist Church, which were met by counterprotesters from his community and school. He has recounted opposing players shouting slurs at him during his games. He did receive an offer from Indiana State University, however, and after confirming with them that they knew he was openly gay, he accepted. He spent his freshman year playing football for the Indiana State Sycamores football team, and continued to face protests and opposition from the Westboro Baptist Church.

However, he continued to face mental health struggles due to the protests and the death of a childhood friend, and ultimately decided to quit football and leave to join North Carolina State University in 2019. That same year, he came out as pansexual. He studied sports psychology. He later transferred to the University of Missouri–St. Louis, where he studied sport management and psychology, due to cost. At UMSL, he worked as student program manager for LGBTQ+ and Diversity Initiatives.

He has been described as an "accidental activist" and, through his social media, has encouraged dozens of others to come out. He has also called for more openly gay athletes. He was a guest on The Ellen DeGeneres Show in January 2019, where DeGeneres gifted his boyfriend, who was in the studio audience, a week-long vacation due to NCAA rules preventing Bain from accepting gifts. He also did some modeling work.

He currently works as a behavioral health therapist.
