= Martha Gellhorn =

American war correspondent (1908–1998)

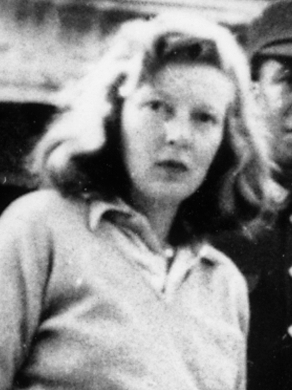
- Gellhorn, 1941
- Born: Martha Ellis Gellhorn; 8 November 1908; St. Louis, Missouri, US
- Died: 15 February 1998 (aged 89); London, England
- Education: John Burroughs School
- Occupations: Author, war correspondent
- Years active: 1934–1998
- Spouses: Ernest Hemingway (m. 1940; div. 1945) T. S. Matthews (m. 1954; div. 1963)
- Mother: Edna Fischel Gellhorn
- Family: Walter Gellhorn (brother)

Martha Ellis Gellhorn (8 November 1908 – 15 February 1998) was an American journalist, novelist, and travel writer who is considered one of the great war correspondents of the 20th century. She reported on virtually every major world conflict that took place during her 60-year career.

She was the third wife of American novelist Ernest Hemingway, from 1940 to 1945.

She died in 1998 by apparent suicide at the age of 89, ill and almost completely blind.

The Martha Gellhorn Prize for Journalism is named after her.

== Early life ==
Gellhorn was born on 8 November 1908, in St. Louis, Missouri, to Edna Fischel Gellhorn, a suffragist, and George Gellhorn, a German-born gynecologist. Her father and maternal grandfather were Jewish, and her maternal grandmother came from a Protestant family. Her brother Walter became a noted law professor at Columbia University, and her younger brother Alfred was an oncologist and dean of the University of Pennsylvania School of Medicine.

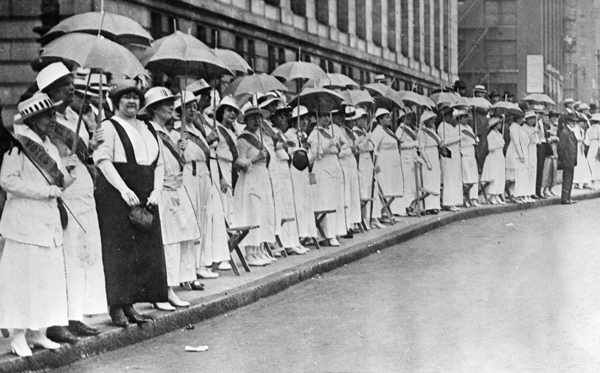
The Golden Lane

At age 7, Gellhorn participated in "The Golden Lane", a rally for women's suffrage at the Democratic Party's 1916 national convention in St. Louis. Women carrying yellow parasols and wearing yellow sashes lined both sides of a main street leading to the St. Louis Coliseum. A tableau of the states was in front of the Art Museum; states that had not enfranchised women were draped in black. Gellhorn and another girl, Mary Taussig, stood in front of the line, representing future voters.

In 1926, Gellhorn graduated from John Burroughs School in St. Louis and enrolled in Bryn Mawr College, several miles outside Philadelphia. The following year, she left without having graduated to pursue a career as a journalist. Her first published articles appeared in The New Republic. In 1930, determined to become a foreign correspondent, she went to France for two years, where she worked at the United Press bureau in Paris, but was fired after she reported sexual harassment by a man connected with the agency. She spent years traveling Europe, writing for newspapers in Paris and St. Louis and covering fashion for Vogue. She became active in the pacifist movement and wrote about her experiences in her 1934 book What Mad Pursuit.

Returning to the United States in 1932, Gellhorn was hired by Harry Hopkins, whom she had met through her friendship with First Lady Eleanor Roosevelt. The Roosevelts invited Gellhorn to live at the White House and she spent evenings there helping Eleanor Roosevelt write correspondence and the first lady's "My Day" syndicated column. She was hired as a field investigator for the Federal Emergency Relief Administration (FERA), created by Franklin D. Roosevelt to help end the Great Depression. Gellhorn traveled around the United States for FERA to report on how the Depression was affecting the country. She first went to Gastonia, North Carolina. Later, she worked with Dorothea Lange, a photographer, to document the everyday lives of the hungry and homeless. Their reports became part of the official government files for the Great Depression. They were able to investigate topics that were not usually open to women of the 1930s. She drew on her research to write a collection of short stories, The Trouble I've Seen (1936). In Idaho doing FERA work, Gellhorn convinced a group of workers to break the windows of the FERA office to draw attention to their crooked boss. Although this worked, she was fired from FERA.

== War in Europe and marriage to Hemingway ==
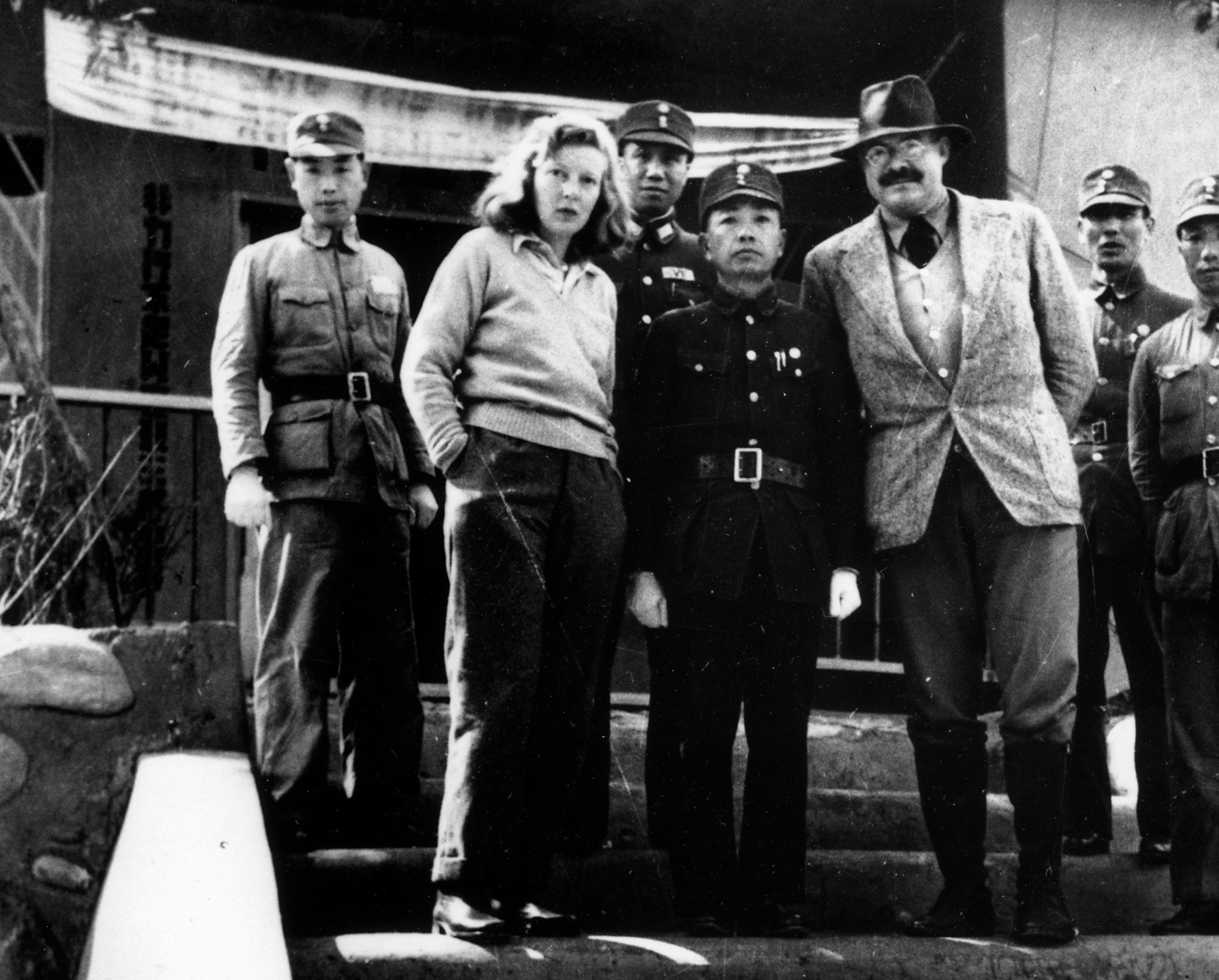
Gellhorn and Ernest Hemingway with General Yu Hanmou, Chongqing, China, 1941

Gellhorn met Ernest Hemingway during a 1936 Christmas family trip to Key West, Florida. Gellhorn had been hired to report for Collier's Weekly on the Spanish Civil War, and the pair decided to travel to Spain together. The seven dispatches she sent from the Spanish battlefront from July 17, 1937 to November 1938 mostly dealt with the condition and anguish suffered by the civilians. Gellhorn and Hemingway celebrated Christmas of 1937 in Barcelona. In Germany, she reported on the rise of Adolf Hitler; in the spring of 1938, months before the Munich Agreement, she was in Czechoslovakia. After the outbreak of World War II, she described these events in the novel A Stricken Field (1940). She later reported the war from Finland, Hong Kong, Burma, Singapore, and England.

In June 1944, Gellhorn applied to the British government for press accreditation to report on the Normandy landings; her application, like those of all female journalists, was refused. Lacking official press credentials, she drove to the south coast of England and, claiming to be a nurse, was allowed onto an American hospital ship about to depart for France. She promptly locked herself in a bathroom and crossed the Channel as a stowaway. Upon landing two days later, near Omaha Beach, she went ashore with a medical team to help recover wounded soldiers. For breaching military regulations, Gellhorn was subsequently arrested and stripped of her war correspondent accreditation. This did not stop her hitching a flight to Italy and then continuing to file reports throughout the war for Collier's. Later she recalled, "I followed the war wherever I could reach it." She was the only woman correspondent to land at Normandy on D-Day on 6 June 1944. She was among the first journalists to report from Dachau concentration camp after it was liberated by U.S. troops on 29 April 1945.

Gellhorn and Hemingway lived together off and on for four years, before marrying in November 1940. (Hemingway had ostensibly lived with his second wife, Pauline Pfeiffer, until 1939). Increasingly resentful of Gellhorn's long absences during her reporting assignments, Hemingway wrote to her when she left their Finca Vigía estate near Havana in 1943 to cover the Italian Front: "Are you a war correspondent, or wife in my bed?" Hemingway, however, would later go to the front just before the Normandy landings, and Gellhorn also went, with Hemingway trying to block her travel. When she arrived, by means of a dangerous ocean voyage, in war-torn London (he had landed there eleven days before her, via an RAF flight on which she had arranged a seat for him), she told him she had had enough. She had found, as had his other wives, that, as described by Bernice Kert in The Hemingway Women: "Hemingway could never sustain a long-lived, wholly satisfying relationship with any one of his four wives. Married domesticity may have seemed to him the desirable culmination of romantic love, but sooner or later he became bored and restless, critical and bullying." After four contentious years of marriage, they divorced in 1945.

The 2012 film Hemingway & Gellhorn is based on these years. The 2011 documentary film No Job for a Woman: The Women Who Fought to Report WWII features Gellhorn and how she changed war reporting.

== Later career ==
After the war, Gellhorn worked for the Atlantic Monthly, covering the Vietnam War and the Arab-Israel conflicts in the 1960s and 70s. She passed her 70th birthday in 1979 but continued working in the following decade, covering the civil wars in Central America. As she approached 80, Gellhorn began to slow down physically, although she still managed to cover the U.S. invasion of Panama in 1989. In 1990, she went door to door in the slum areas of Panama City to report on civilian casualties resulting from the U.S. invasion. She finally retired from journalism as the 1990s began. An operation for cataracts was unsuccessful and left her with permanently impaired vision. Gellhorn announced that she was "too old" to cover the Balkan conflicts in the 1990s. She did manage one last overseas trip to Brazil in 1995 to report on poverty in that country, which was published in the literary journal Granta. This last feat was accomplished with great difficulty as Gellhorn's eyesight was failing, and she could not read her own manuscripts.

Gellhorn's books include a collection of articles on war, The Face of War (1959); The Lowest Trees Have Tops (1967), a novel about McCarthyism; an account of her travels (including one trip with Hemingway), Travels with Myself and Another (1978); and a collection of her peacetime journalism, The View from the Ground (1988).

Peripatetic by nature, Gellhorn reckoned that in a 40-year span of her life, she had created homes in 19 locales.

== Personal life ==
Gellhorn's first major affair was with the French economist Bertrand de Jouvenel. It began in 1930, when she was 22 years old, and lasted until 1934. She would have married de Jouvenel if his wife had consented to a divorce.

She met Ernest Hemingway in Key West, Florida, in 1936. They married in 1940. Gellhorn resented her reflected fame as Hemingway's third wife, remarking that she had no intention of "being a footnote in someone else's life." As a condition for granting interviews, she was known to insist that Hemingway's name not be mentioned. As she put it once, "I've been a writer for over 40 years. I was a writer before I met him and I was a writer after I left him. Why should I be merely a footnote in his life?"

While married to Hemingway, Gellhorn had an affair with U.S. paratrooper Major General James M. Gavin, commanding general of the 82nd Airborne Division. Gavin was the youngest divisional commander in the U.S. Army in World War II.

Between marriages after divorcing Hemingway in 1945, Gellhorn had romantic liaisons with "L," Laurance Rockefeller, an American businessman (1945); journalist William Walton (1947) (no relation to the British composer); and medical doctor David Gurewitsch (1950). In 1954, she married the former managing editor of Time Magazine, T. S. Matthews. She and Matthews divorced in 1963. She stayed in London for some time before moving to Kenya and then to Kilgwrrwg near Devauden in South Wales. She was very taken by the niceness of the Welsh people and lived there from 1980 to 1994 before finally returning to London because of her ill health.

In 1949, Gellhorn adopted a boy, Sandro, from an Italian orphanage. He was formally renamed George Alexander Gellhorn, and widely called Sandy. Gellhorn was reportedly a devoted mother for a time but was not by nature maternal. She left Sandy in the care of relatives in Englewood, New Jersey, for long periods as she travelled, and he eventually attended boarding school. Their relationship was said to have become embittered.

Gellhorn and the writer Sybille Bedford met in Rome in 1949 and developed a strong platonic friendship. It long survived volatility on both sides and entailed much moral, creative and financial support for her friend on Gellhorn's part until she ended the friendship in the early 1980s.

Regarding sex, in 1972 Gellhorn wrote:

If I practised sex out of moral conviction, that was one thing; but to enjoy it ... seemed a defeat. I accompanied men and was accompanied in action, in the extrovert part of life; I plunged into that ... but not sex; that seemed to be their delight, and all I got was a pleasure of being wanted, I suppose, and the tenderness (not nearly enough) that a man gives when he is satisfied. I daresay I was the worst bed partner in five continents.

On her relationship with Hemingway, she said "My whole memory of sex with Ernest is the invention of excuses, and failing that, the hope that it would soon be over."

However, the legacy of Gellhorn's personal life remains shrouded in controversy. Supporters of Gellhorn say her unauthorized biographer, Carl Rollyson, is guilty of "sexual scandal-mongering and cod psychology." Several of her prominent close friends (among them the actress Betsy Drake, journalist John Pilger, writer James Fox, and Martha's younger brother Alfred) have dismissed the characterizations of her as sexually manipulative and maternally deficient. Her supporters include her stepson, Sandy Matthews, who describes Gellhorn as "very conscientious" in her role as stepmother; and Jack Hemingway once said that Gellhorn, his father's third wife, was his "favorite other mother."

== Death and legacy ==
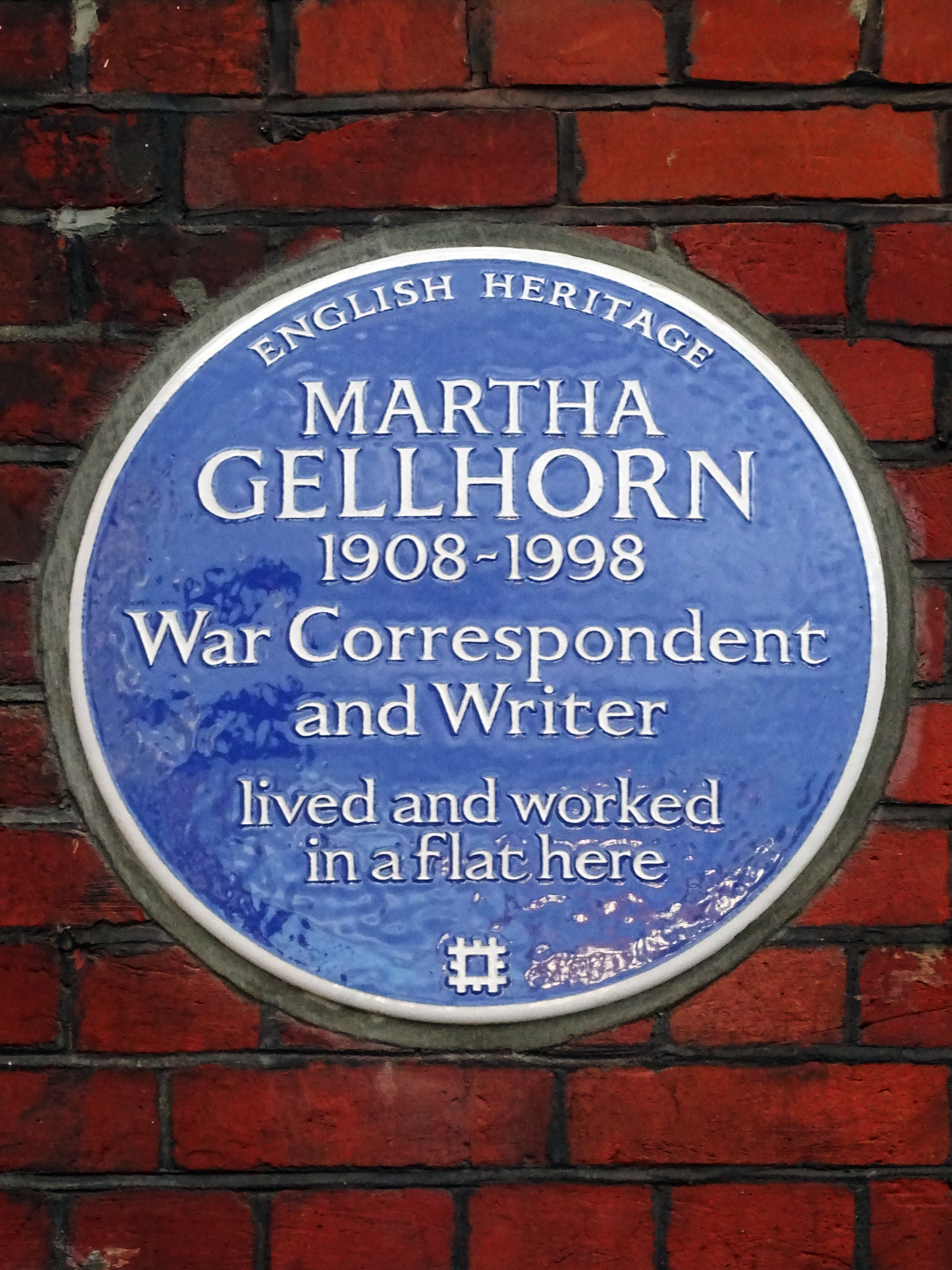
Martha Gellhorn has been commemorated with an English Heritage Trust blue plaque at 72 Cadogan Square, Knightsbridge, London, SW1X 0EA

In her last years, Gellhorn was in frail health, nearly blind and suffering from ovarian cancer that had spread to her liver. On 15 February 1998, she died by suicide in London apparently by swallowing a cyanide capsule.

The Martha Gellhorn Prize for Journalism was established in 1999 in her honor.

In 2019, a blue English Heritage plaque was unveiled at Gellhorn's former London home, the first to feature the dedication of "war correspondent".

In 2021 a Purple Plaque was placed on the cottage she lived in near Kilgwrrwg, north-west of Chepstow, as part of a national effort to commemorate remarkable women.

== In popular culture ==
On 5 October 2007, the United States Postal Service announced that it would honor five 20th-century journalists with first-class rate postage stamps, to be issued on 22 April 2008: Martha Gellhorn; John Hersey; George Polk; Ruben Salazar; and Eric Sevareid. Postmaster General Jack Potter announced the stamp series at the Associated Press Managing Editors Meeting in Washington, D.C.

In 2011, Gellhorn was the subject of an hour-long episode of the World Media Rights series Extraordinary Women, which airs on the BBC, and periodically in the United States on PBS.

In 2012, Gellhorn was played by Nicole Kidman in Philip Kaufman's film, Hemingway & Gellhorn.

Martha Gellhorn's relationship with Ernest Hemingway is the subject of Paula McLain's 2018 novel, Love and Ruin. In 2021, Hemingway, a three-episode, six-hour documentary recapitulation of Hemingway's life, labors, and loves, aired on PBS. It was co-produced and directed by Ken Burns and Lynn Novick. It contains considerable footage and photographs of Gellhorn, who is voiced by Meryl Streep, and recollections of those who knew her and her life with Hemingway first-hand.

In her collection of short stories called "Old babes in the wood", Margaret Atwood briefly recalls Martha Gellhorn's reporting from the Second World War, notably her article on the breaking through the Gothic Line and the capturing of the Fortunato Ridge in 1944.

== Bibliography ==
- Gellhorn, Martha (1934). What mad pursuit : a novel. New York: Frederick A. Stokes Company.
- The Trouble I've Seen (1936, new edition by Eland, 2012) Depression-era set of short stories;
- A Stricken Field (1940) novel set in Czechoslovakia at the outbreak of war;
- The Heart of Another (1941);
- Liana (1944);
- The Undefeated (1945);
- Love Goes to Press: A Comedy in Three Acts (1947) (with Virginia Cowles);
- The Wine of Astonishment (1948) World War II novel, republished in 1989 as Point of No Return;
- Gellhorn, Martha (1953). "About Shorty". In Birmingham, Frederic A. (ed.). The girls from Esquire. London: Arthur Barker. pp. 47–56.
- The Honeyed Peace: Stories (1953);
- Two by Two (1958);
- The Face of War (1959) collection of war journalism, updated in 1993;
- His Own Man (1961);
- Pretty Tales for Tired People (1965);
- Vietnam: A New Kind of War (1966);
- The Lowest Trees Have Tops (1967) a novel;
- Travels with Myself and Another: A Memoir (1978, new edition by Eland, 2002);
- The Weather in Africa (1978, new edition by Eland, 2006);
- The View From the Ground (1989; new edition by Eland, 2016), a collection of peacetime journalism;
- The Short Novels of Martha Gellhorn (1991); US edition being The Novellas of Martha Gellhorn (1993)
- Selected Letters of Martha Gellhorn (2006), edited by Caroline Moorehead;
- Yours, for Probably Always: Martha Gellhorn's Letters of Love and War 1930–1949 (2019), edited by Janet Somerville.

Books about Gellhorn

- Somerville, Janet (2019) Yours, for Probably Always: Martha Gellhorn's Letters of Love and WarAmazon link
- Clayton, Meg Waite (2018) Beautiful Exiles: A Novel
- Hardy Dorman, Angelia (2012). Martha Gellhorn: Myth, Motif and Remembrance.
- Mackrell, Judith (2021). Going with the Boys: Six Extraordinary Women Writing from the Front Line (also: The Correspondents: Six Women Writers on the Front Lines of World War II – in USA & Canada).
- McLain, Paula (2018). Love and Ruin: A novel. Ballantyne. p. 374. ASIN B076Z127Y2.
- McLoughlin, Kate (2007). Martha Gellhorn: The War Writer in the Field and in the Text.
- Moorehead, Caroline (2003). Martha Gellhorn: A Life. (a.k.a. Gellhorn: A Twentieth-Century Life)
- Moreira, Peter (2007). Hemingway on the China Front: His WWII Spy Mission with Martha Gellhorn.
- Rollyson, Carl (2000). Nothing Ever Happens to the Brave: The Story of Martha Gellhorn.
- Rollyson, Carl E. (2007). Beautiful Exile: The Life of Martha Gellhorn.
- Vaill, Amanda (2014). Hotel Florida: Truth, Love, and Death in the Spanish Civil War. Picador. ASIN B00FCR3JHW.

== See also ==
- Historic recurrence
