= William Schatzkamer =

William Schatzkamer (August 17, 1916 - September 12, 2012) was an American educator, pianist, and conductor.

Born in New York City he was trained in piano at The Juilliard School and, during the 1940s, served as assisting solo artist with Paul Robeson in addition to successful tours as a recitalist in his own right. Along with Rachmaninoff, Schatzkamer was a student of Siloti, himself a student of Liszt.

For three years, starting in 1948, Schatzkamer toured the United States, Canada and Mexico under the direction of Columbia Artists Management. He played a total 175 events including three very successful recitals in New York's Town Hall. After the first of these Town Hall recitals, he was able to sign a contract with RCA Victor.

Schatzkamer settled in the St. Louis area where in 1951 he started to serve on the faculty of Washington University in St. Louis and continued until 1987 (36 years), being named Professor Emeritus in 1987. In addition, he was the original music director and conductor of the University City Symphony Orchestra, serving in that capacity for over 35 years, and conductor of the Gateway Festival Orchestra. Schatzkamer retired as conductor of the Gateway Festival Orchestra in 2002.
