= Mary Wiltenburg =

American journalist (born 1976)

Mary Wiltenburg (born July 6, 1976) is an American journalist based in Baltimore, Maryland.

== Biography ==
Wiltenburg was born July 6, 1976, in Rochester, New York. She is the daughter of Candace O'Connor and the niece of Kyrie O'Connor. She is a 1998 graduate of Swarthmore College with a degree in English.

Wiltenburg's freelance reporting and photography have appeared in The Christian Science Monitor, Der Spiegel, The Boston Globe, and Grist, and her multimedia and broadcast work on Nightline, This American Life, and Morning Edition. She started her journalism career at Seattle NPR affiliate KUOW and This American Life, before joining the staff of The Christian Science Monitor from 2001 to 2004, where she covered prison education, clergy sexual abuse, the aftermath of the Rwandan genocide, and the dawn of marriage equality in Massachusetts.

== Awards ==
- 2001 National Education Writers Association feature writing award, for her story Shakespeare Behind Bars
- 2008 National Education Writers Association multimedia award, for the Little Bill Clinton series
- 2008 German Marshall Fund Peter R. Weitz Award, for her coverage of US service members stationed in Germany
- 2010 International Catholic Union of the Press Award for solidarity with refugees, for her series Little Bill Clinton
- 2010 American Society of Journalists and Authors feature writing award, for her profile of a refugee stranded in Tanzania
