= Belleville Philharmonic Society =

Orchestra in Belleville, Illinois

- Orchestra
- Founded: 1866
- Location: Belleville, Illinois
- Principal conductor: Joseph Choi

The Belleville Philharmonic Society is an orchestra founded in 1866 in Belleville, Illinois by a group of interested citizens. It is the second oldest continuously operating orchestra in the United States. It consists of three ensembles - an orchestra, a chorale, and a youth orchestra. The current conductor for the orchestra is Joseph Choi and the current conductor of the chorale is Richard Thompson. Christopher Gass is the conductor for the youth orchestra.

== Goal ==
The Philharmonic Society of Belleville is a not-for-profit organization dedicated to supporting arts in the greater Belleville community. The philharmonic has been an integral part of providing musical experience for musicians and music lovers of all ages since its founding. The Belleville Philharmonic Society maintains a strong bond with the community and regularly performs for civic events such as Art on the Square and Belleville Sister Cities. It partners with numerous area organizations such as The Belleville Chamber of Commerce, Belleville Main Street, and the City of Belleville itself.

== Concerto Competitions ==
The society hosts the Stars of Tomorrow, an annual concerto competition for youth through college-age musicians throughout the area. Winners of the competition play with the philharmonic orchestra at its October concert. Additionally, the youth orchestra hosts the Tuerck Memorial Concerto Competition in honor of youth orchestra founder, George Tuerck and is open to students in their junior year of high school and below. Winners of this receive a small scholarship and play with the youth orchestra at its winter concert. Both contests are traditionally held in the spring.

== History ==
The Philharmonic Society of Belleville first organized in 1866, with its first concert taking place in January 1867. Founding musicians and community members included Christopher Espenhain, merchant and cornet virtuoso; Martin Herr, an alderman; Henry Viehmann; Charles Magin, a noted band leader; Dr. Carl Neubert, physician and editor of the German newspaper Post und Zeitung; Theodore Decker, an accomplished pianist; and Martin Medart, a justice of the peace and clarinet player. The group performed its first concert on January 26, 1867, and in 1897, it purchased the hall on North Jackson Street which previously housed a Kindergarten. The first conductor was Theodore Decker. In 1962, the society added a youth orchestra directed by George Tuerck and in 1966 the society added the Philharmonic Chorale directed by Charles Laughlin. Prior to engaging Robert Hart Baker, Robert Howard was the conductor for 21 years from 1995 to 2016.

Orchestra conductors through 1974 included the following: Theodore Decker 1866-69, Julius Liese 1869-1885, Gustave Neubert 1885-1910, Adolph Hansing 1910-1911, Fred A. Kern 1911-1914, Frederich Fischer 1914-1919, Carl Magin 1919-1921, Frank Macke 1921-1922, John W. Marsh 1923-1935, Charles Muckensturm 1935-1938, Don Foster 1938-1943, Rudolph Magin 1944-1953, George Tuerck 1954-1961, Max Stendel 1961-1963, William Schatzkammer 1963-1969, Robert Schieber 1969-1971, Laurent Torno 1971-1974, Carmine Ficocelli 1974-1975, Robert J. Hachmeister 1974-1975

== Board of directors ==
Ethan Edwards - President; Eric Richter - Vice-president; Laura Veach - Secretary; Eileen Lapka - Asst. secretary; Barbara Compton - Treasurer; Julie Niesen - Asst. treasurer and ticket sales; Kathryn Bowman; Kathy Albers; Dan Crockett; Heather Kastelein; Hilda Koluch; Kathryn Lakiotis; Danny Nollman; Roger Schlueter;
