= University City Symphony Orchestra =

Community orchestra in Missouri, US

University City Symphony Orchestra (UCSO)
- Orchestra
- Founded: 1960; 66 years ago
- Location: University City, Missouri
- Principal conductor: Dr. Leon Burke III
- Website: www.ucso.org

The University City Symphony Orchestra (UCSO) is a non-profit community orchestra, established in 1960, giving amateur musicians in the St. Louis, Missouri area the opportunity to play orchestral literature. Though drawing on musicians from throughout the surrounding area, it rehearses and holds the majority of its free concerts in University City, Missouri.

Under the direction of Dr. Leon Burke III since 1997, the orchestra sponsors the William Schatzkamer Young Artists Competition, partners with other area musical organizations and plays throughout St. Louis area and surrounding counties though the Center of Creative Arts (COCA) is home to most of its performances.

== History ==
The University City Symphony Orchestra was established in 1960, in part to provide summer employment for the musicians of the St. Louis Symphony Orchestra. Its first president, Lily Kaufman was wife of then-mayor Nathan Kaufman.

== People ==
- Charles J. Schuder president (2002–2005), (2006–present)

=== Music Directors ===
- Leon Burke III (1997–present)
- William Schatzkamer (1960–1997)
