= Walter Metcalfe =

American lawyer (born 1938)

Walter Lee Metcalfe Jr. (born December 19, 1938) is a lawyer based in St. Louis, Missouri. Noted for his roles in the purchase and sale of professional sports teams and in numerous civic improvement projects, he has been called "perhaps the region's most important" dealmaker by the St. Louis Post-Dispatch newspaper.

== Early life and education ==
Metcalfe was born in St. Louis and grew up in University City, a first-ring suburb. He attended John Burroughs School, a private school in nearby Ladue, Missouri, graduating in 1956. He later graduated from Washington University in St. Louis and from University of Virginia School of Law.

== Career ==
Metcalfe joined the Armstrong Teasdale law firm in St. Louis in 1964, then in 1982 moved to Bryan Cave, an international law firm headquartered in St. Louis. He would eventually serve as its chairman for a decade.

Metcalfe has helped negotiate many high-profile deals in St. Louis and beyond, including the agreements that led to the construction of the Scottrade Center hockey arena, the Pulitzer Arts Foundation museum, the Donald Danforth Plant Science Center, and the Edward Jones Dome football stadium. He twice helped negotiate the sale of the St. Louis Blues hockey team, and negotiated its purchase three times. He also wrote the contracts that sold the New England Patriots to James Orthwein, an heir to the St. Louis-based Busch brewing family; and then to Boston businessman Robert Kraft.

In 2003, he was named chairman of the Federal Reserve Bank of St. Louis.

Beginning around 2007, he drove a $380 million renovation of the Gateway Arch grounds, drawing the participation of a half-dozen agencies and designing regional sales tax and fundraising campaigns to fund it. He headed the project's lead organization, CityArchRiver, until 2015.

He has served on boards of several prominent local organizations, including Washington University in St. Louis, the Danforth Foundation, Pulitzer Arts Foundation, and more.

In 2017, the Post-Dispatch named Metcalfe its Citizen of the Year.
