= List of waste management companies =

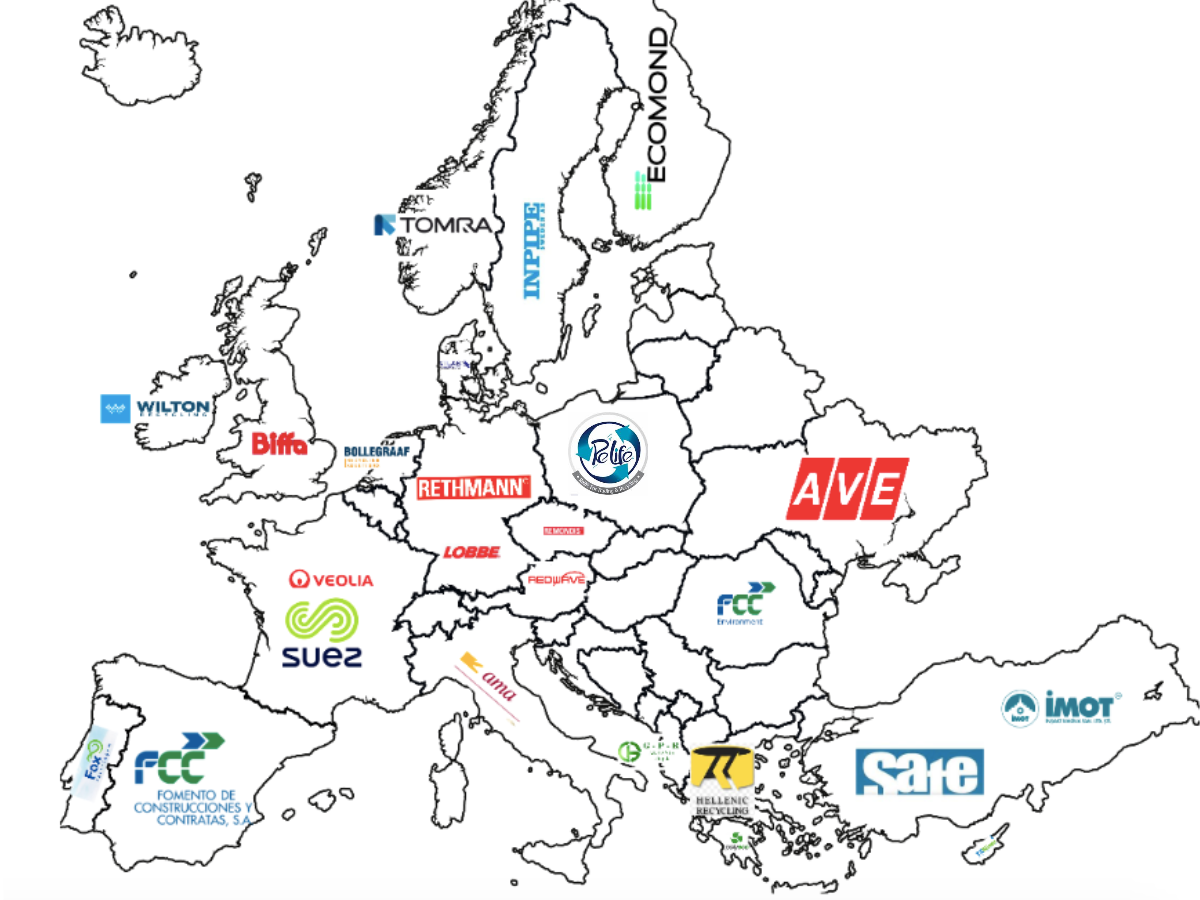
European recycling industries

This is a list of notable companies in the waste management industry. Many entries are multinational corporations, and the associated country listing is by location of management headquarters.

== Companies ==
Name	Founded	Headquarters	Country	Fleet of vehicles	Revenues (US$M)
Allied Waste Industries	1988-2008	Arizona	USA		6.230 (2007)
Biffa	1912	High Wycombe	United Kingdom	2.794	1.163 (2020)
Bingo Industries	2017	Sydney	Australia	340	36 (2019)
Biogen UK	2005	Milton Ernest	United Kingdom		25.8 (2020)
Browning-Ferris Industries	1968-1999	Texas	USA		
Casella Waste Systems	1975	Rutland	USA		660 (2018)
Cleanaway	1975	Melbourne	Australia	4.000	2.110
CleanHub	2020	Berlin	Germany		
Clean Harbors	1980	Norwell	USA		3.400 (2019)
College Hunks Hauling Junk	2004	Tampa	USA		
Cory	1896	London	United Kingdom		173 (2020)
Covanta Energy Corporation	1939	New Jersey	USA		1.868 (2018)
GFL Environmental	2007	Ontario	Canada		
Envirogreen Recycling	2012	Armagh	United Kingdom		6.4 (2019)
Fomento de Construcciones y Contratas	1900	Barcelona	Spain		11.152 (2012)
Himark BioGas	1976	Edmonton	Canada		1.64 (2019)
Junk King	2005	Burlingame	USA		
Lystek	2000	Ontario	Canada		1.5 (2020)
MBA Polymers	1994	Hackensack, New Jersey	United States		
Remondis	1934	Lünen	Germany	10.100	8.900 (2019)
Renewi	1880	Milton Keynes	United Kingdom		1.780 (2019)
Republic Services	1998	Arizona	USA		9.400 (2016)
SA Waste Holdings	1990	Johannesburg	South Africa		
Serco	1929	Hook	United Kingdom		3.248 (2019)
Service Corporation of America	1970-1984	Massachusetts	United States		
Sita	1918	Paris	France		450
Stericycle	1989	Bannockburn, Illinois	United States		US$ 3.58 billion (2017)
Suez	2008	La Défense	France		18.015 (2019)
Tervita	1979	Alberta	Canada	950	1.740 (2020)
Veolia Environmental	1853	Paris	France	11.000	9.020 (2009)
Waste Connections	1997	Texas	USA		5.390 (2019)
Waste Management	1968	Texas	USA	26.000	14,485 (2017)

== See also ==
- LAWDC contains list of UK local authority waste disposal companies
