= Thurrock Thameside Nature Park =

Nature reserve in Essex, England

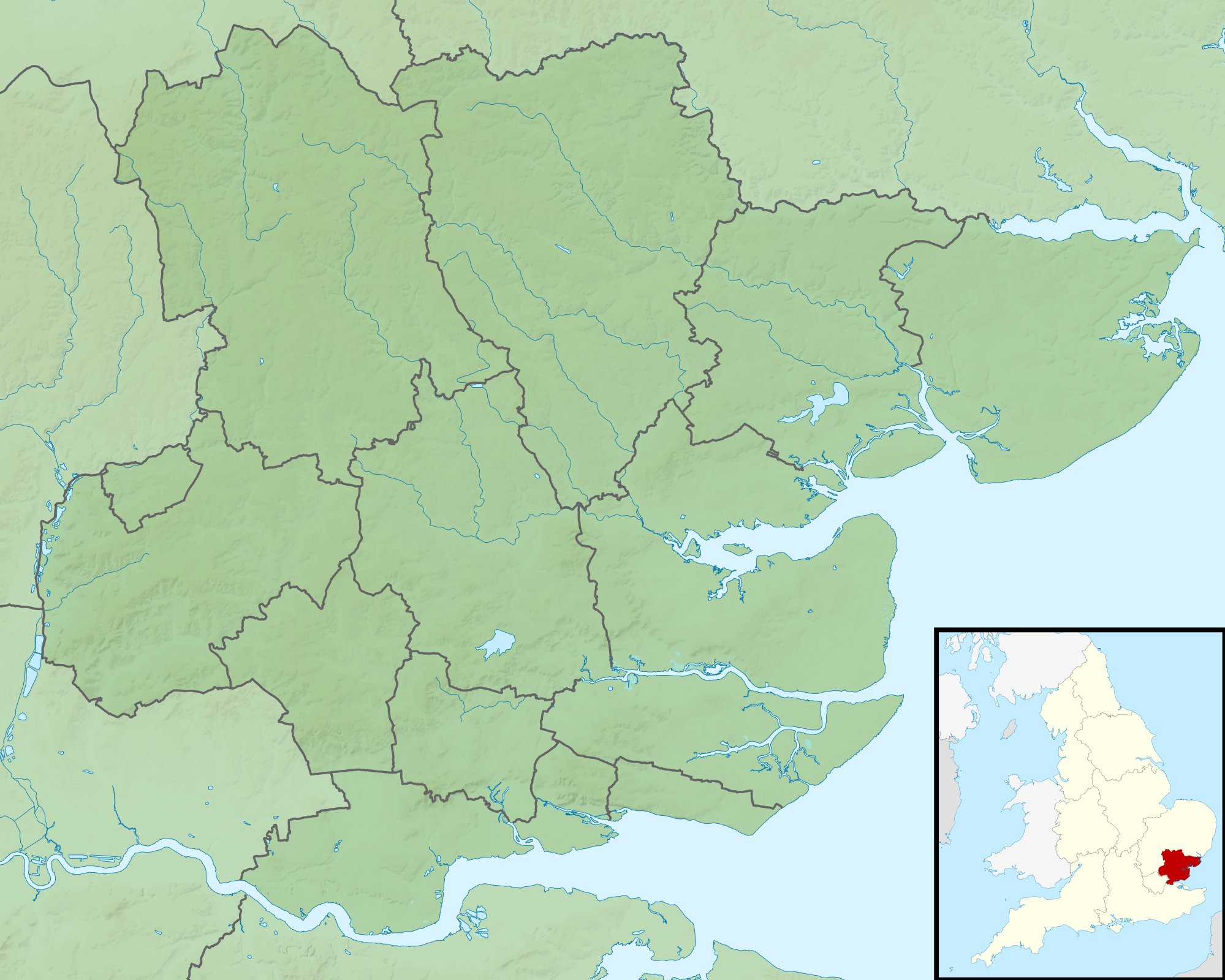
- Location within Essex
- Location: Thurrock, England
- Nearest city: Mucking
- Coordinates: 51.49°N 0.43°E
- Area: 845 acres (342 ha)
- Established: 2012
- Governing body: Essex Wildlife Trust
- Website: www.essexwt.org.uk/reserves/thurrock-thameside

Thurrock Thameside Nature Park is an Essex Wildlife Trust nature reserve located on top of the former Mucking Marshes Landfill in Thurrock, England which will eventually cover 845 acres (342 ha). It is next to the River Thames and provides good bird and ship watching. The Cory Environmental Trust Visitor Centre is located at the preserve and provides a rooftop viewing platform.

== The Nature Park ==
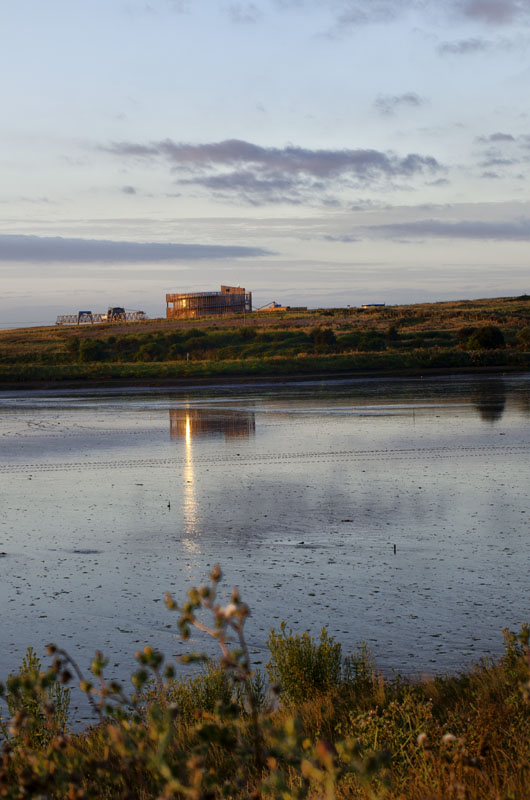
The Nature Park

The Thurrock Thameside Nature Park currently covers 120 acres (49 ha), but will grow to 845 acres (342 ha). It is by the side of Mucking Creek, overlooking the Thames and directly overlooks Mucking Flats and Marshes - coastal marshes and saltmarsh designated a Site of Special Scientific Interest (SSSI) and Special Protection Area (SPA). These mudflats form the largest intertidal feeding area for wintering wildfowl and waders west of Canvey Island on the north bank of the Thames.

At the east end of the nature park, the sea wall has been breached to provide tidal mud flats. The site has been landscaped to include grasslands, woodland, ponds and reedbeds. It is already home to mice, voles, shrews and hares as well as the rare shrill carder-bee.

The opening ceremony on 11 May 2013 was performed by David Attenborough. In his opening speech, he said, "What you have done here...is a monument to what can be done to restore nature".

The visitors centre is built on hydraulic jacks to cope with settlement of the underlying rubbish. There is a network of footpaths, bridleways and cycle routes across the site. The park won the conservation category in the Observer Ethical Awards 2011.

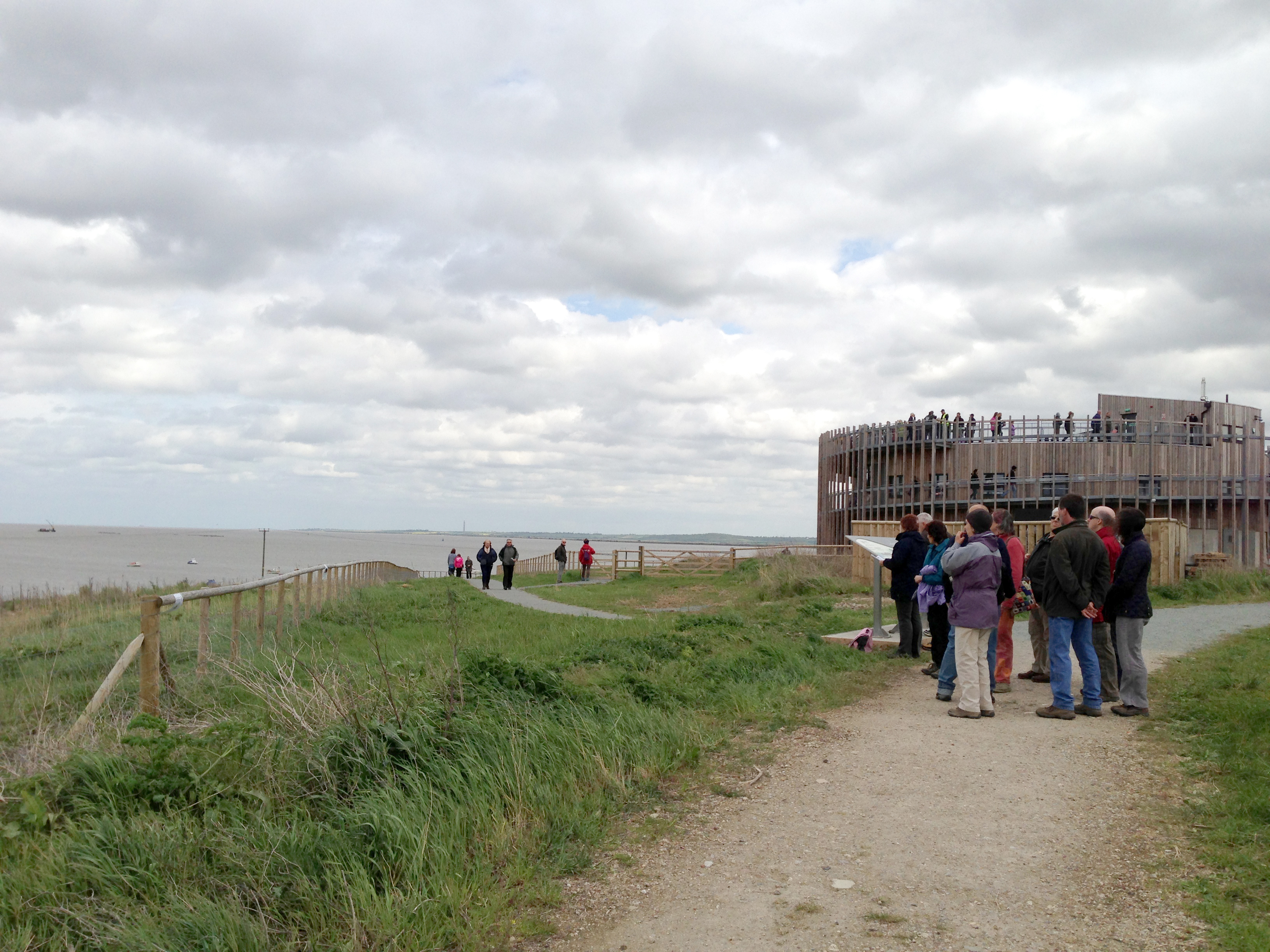
The Cory Environmental Centre adjacent to the Thames Estuary

The park was established in partnership with the owners of Mucking Landfill, Cory Environmental Ltd, Cory Environmental Trust in Thurrock, who provided the funding for the visitor centre, and Essex County Council's Parkland project, which also provided vital funds.

== History ==
The site was once a gravel pit. Once the gravel was all extracted, it was used as a landfill for 50 years by London. The waste is stacked 30 metres (98 ft) high. A thick clay cap was placed on top followed by soil and plants. Methane from the rotting waste is being captured and burned to produce electricity.
