= LAWDC =

In the UK a local authority waste disposal company (LAWDC) is an arms length waste management operator. These companies were created when the waste management industry was privatised. Some of these companies have now been sold on to larger commercial waste companies and some are still owned by local authorities.

== LAWDC Waste Disposal Companies ==
=== Current ===
- AD Waste, Flintshire
- Amgen Cymru, Rhondda Cynon Taff, Amgen Cymru website
- County Environmental Services, Cornwall, CES website
- CWM Ltd, Cumbria, CWM website
- CWM Environmental Ltd, Carmarthenshire, CWM Environmental website
- Greater Manchester Waste, Greater Manchester, GM Waste website
- Mersey Waste Holdings Limited, Merseyside,
- NEWS (Norfolk Environmental Waste Services), Norfolk,
- Local Asbestos Removal Contractors, Warrington, Local asbestos removal contractors
- Asbestos Removal Manchester, Greater Manchester, Asbestos Removal Manchester NEWS website
- Premier Waste, Durham, Premier Waste website
- Silent Valley Waste Services, Blaenau Gwent, Silent Valley Waste Services website
- Swansea City Waste Disposal Company, Swansea
- Yorwaste, North Yorkshire, Yorwaste

=== Sold on ===
- 3C Waste Management - Cheshire - sold to Waste Recycling Group
- Coventry and Solihull Waste Disposal Company - Coventry & Solihull
- Landfill Management - Wigan
- Poplars Resource Management - Staffordshire - sold to Biffa
- Sheffield City Waste Management - Sheffield City
- Suffolk Waste Disposal - Suffolk
- Surrey Operational Services - Surrey
- The Waste Company - Gloucestershire - sold to Cory Environmental
- Wastewise Waste Management - Humberside
- Wyvern Waste - Somerset - sold to Viridor

== See also ==
- List of waste management companies
- Waste management
