= Waste Italia =

- Industry: Environment
- Founded: 2000
- Headquarters: Milan, Italy
- Number of locations: Albonese, Bedizzole, Vado Ligure, Cavenago d'Adda, Cermenate, Chivasso, Collegno, Romagnano Sesia
- Key people: Giuseppe Maria Chirico
- Website: www.wasteitalia.it

Waste Italia S.p.A. is a leading company in Italy in the environmental field that deals with collection, treatment and disposal of non-hazardous waste.

== Historical background ==
Waste Italia was founded in 2000 by the acquisition by some Italian businessmen, including Pietro Colucci, of the American company Waste Management Inc.

In 2014 Waste Italia joined Kinexia SpA, through the reverse merger that led Kinexia to merge with Sostenya and its subsidiary Waste Italia.

== Certifications ==
The company adopts an integrated quality and environmental management that meets international standards UNI EN ISO 9001 and ISO 14001, certified by ANCIS (National Association for the Certification and Quality Service Industry).

Waste Italia Corporate Social Responsibility implementation is carried out an organic way with the other companies of the Gruppo Waste Italia (formerly known as Kinexia), in order to integrate environmental activities with those on renewable energy.
