= Van Heyningen and Haward Architects =

Londona architectural firm

van Heyningen and Haward Architects
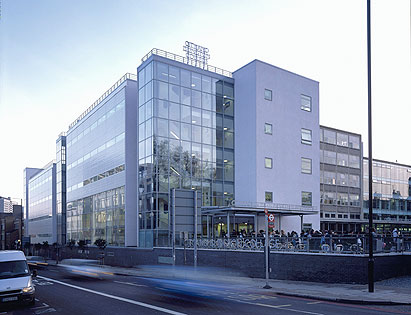
- City and Islington College

Practice information
- Key architects: Joanna van Heyningen, Founder; Birkin Haward, Founder; James McCosh, Partner; Chris Wilderspin, Partner; Meryl Townley, Partner
- Founded: 1983

Van Heyningen and Haward is an architectural practice, founded in 1983 by Birkin Haward and Joanna van Heyningen, and now owned and managed by James McCosh and Meryl Townley. The London architects work primarily in education, and have also worked in the heritage, community and health sectors.

In 2010 the practice produced a monograph detailing their work to date; van Heyningen and Haward – Buildings and Projects. The book was published by Right Angle Publishing and edited by Ian Latham. As well as giving an overview of the projects undertaken by the practice from inception until publication, it also includes essays by Trevor Garnham and contributions by Ken Powell and Patrick Lynch. The launch party for the book was held at Latymer Upper School, a long-standing client of the practice.

== Selected projects ==
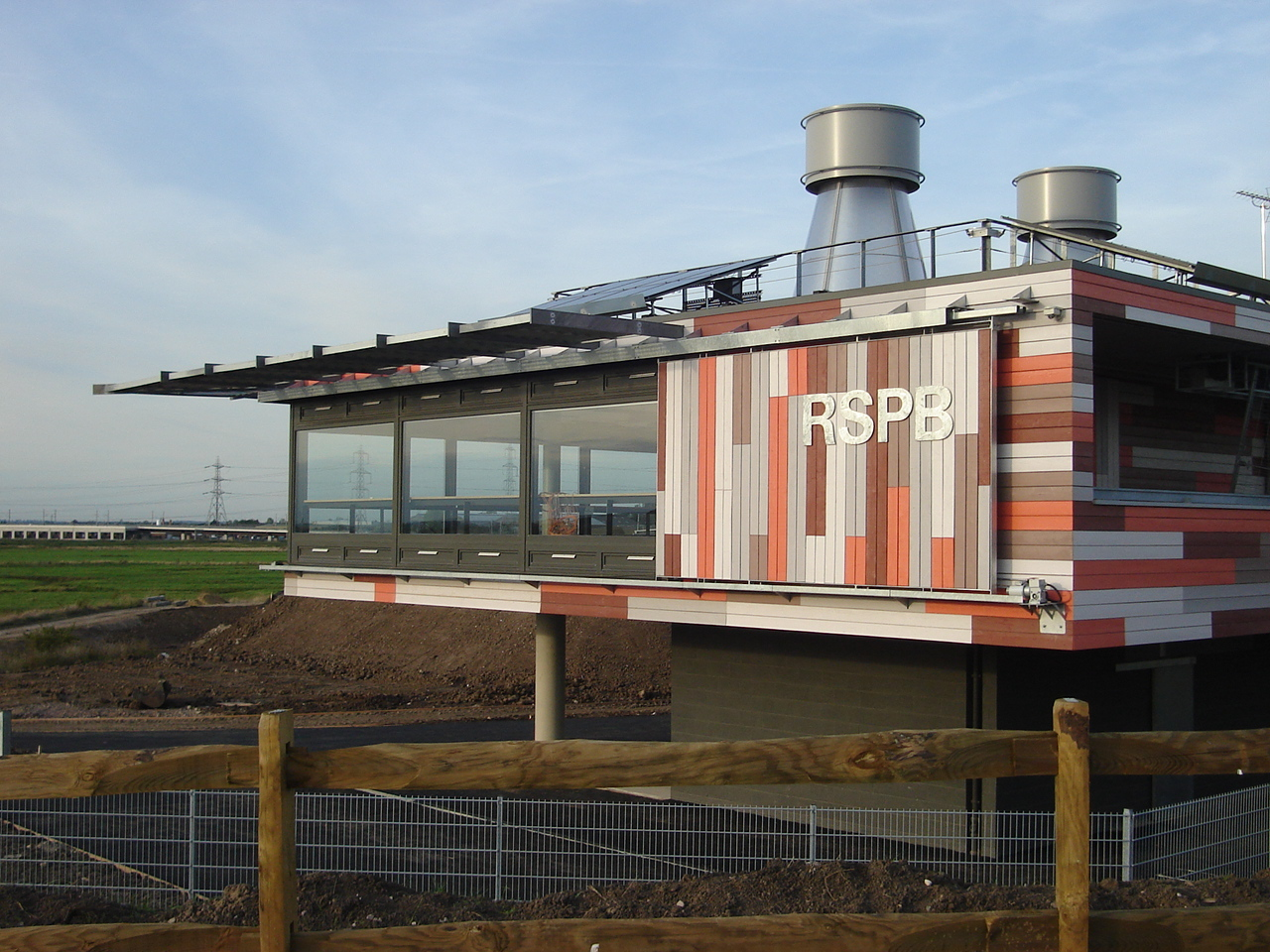
RSPB Environment and Education Centre, Rainham Marshes

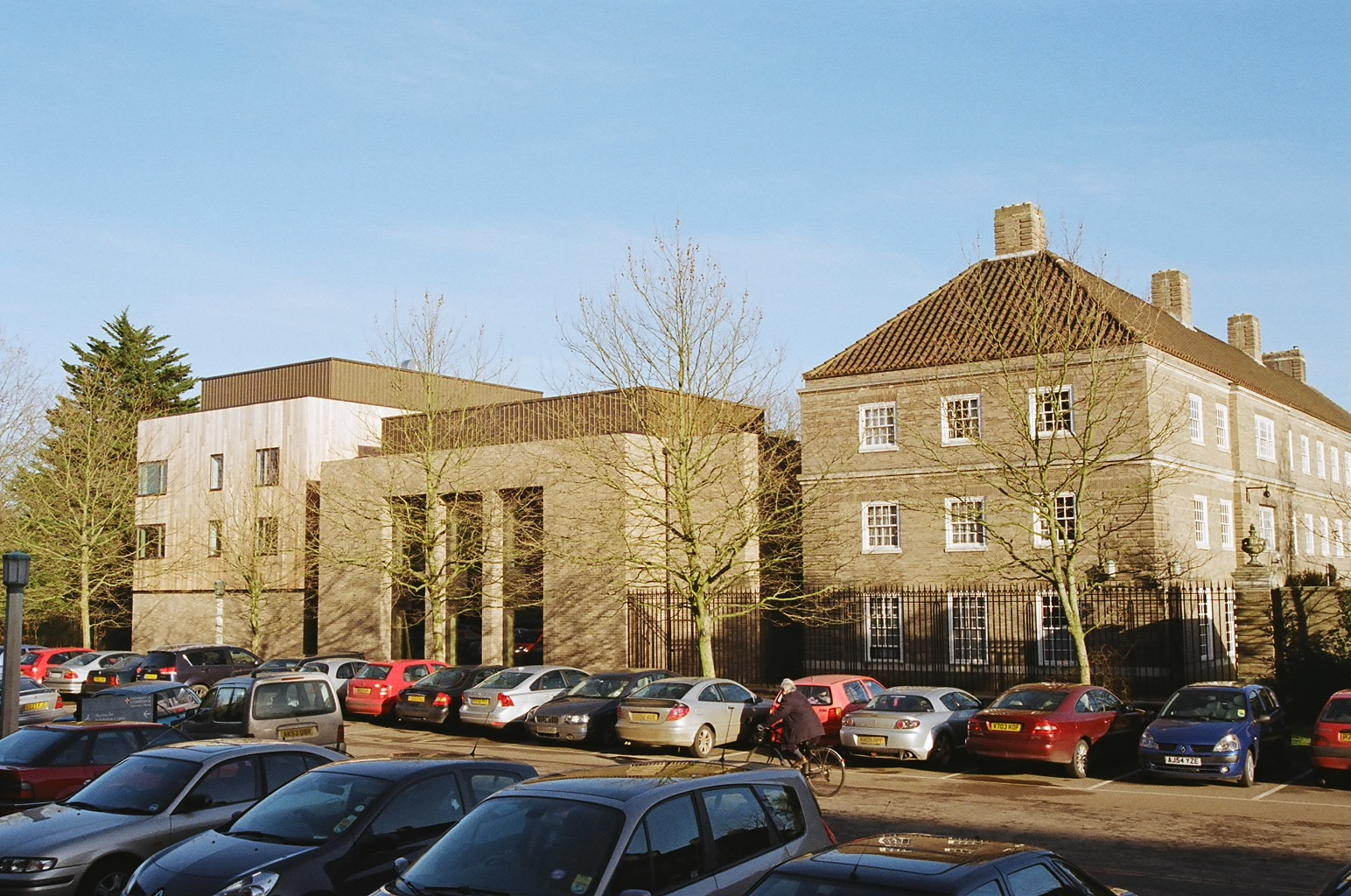
Clare College, Cambridge – Lerner Court

- Quintin Kynaston Community Academy (now Harris Academy St John's Wood), St John's Wood, North London
- Leicester Cathedral reordering
- Bow School, East London
- Cory Environmental Centre, Mucking Marshes, Essex
- Rainham Marshes Nature Reserve, Environment and Education Centre
- Clovelly Visitor Centre, North Devon
- Platform, Islington
- Lerner Court, Clare College, Cambridge
- Refurbishment of No.1 Smithery, Chatham Historic Dockyard, Kent
- Bolton Market Hall
- City and Islington College Sixth Form Centre
- Latymer Upper School
- Rivergate Centre, Barking
- Kaleidoscope, Lewisham
- New North London Synagogue
- Wilson Court, Fitzwilliam College, Cambridge
- West Ham station
- Gateway to the White Cliffs, Dover
- Jacqueline Du Pré Music Building, St Hilda's College, Oxford
- Stelios Ioannou Centre for Classical and Byzantine Studies, University of Oxford
- National Centre for Early Music, York
- Sutton Hoo Visitor Centre, Suffolk
- Polhill Library, University of Bedfordshire
- Chinese Picture Gallery, Ashmolean Museum, University of Oxford
- Tomb of Richard III, Leicester Cathedral

== Awards ==
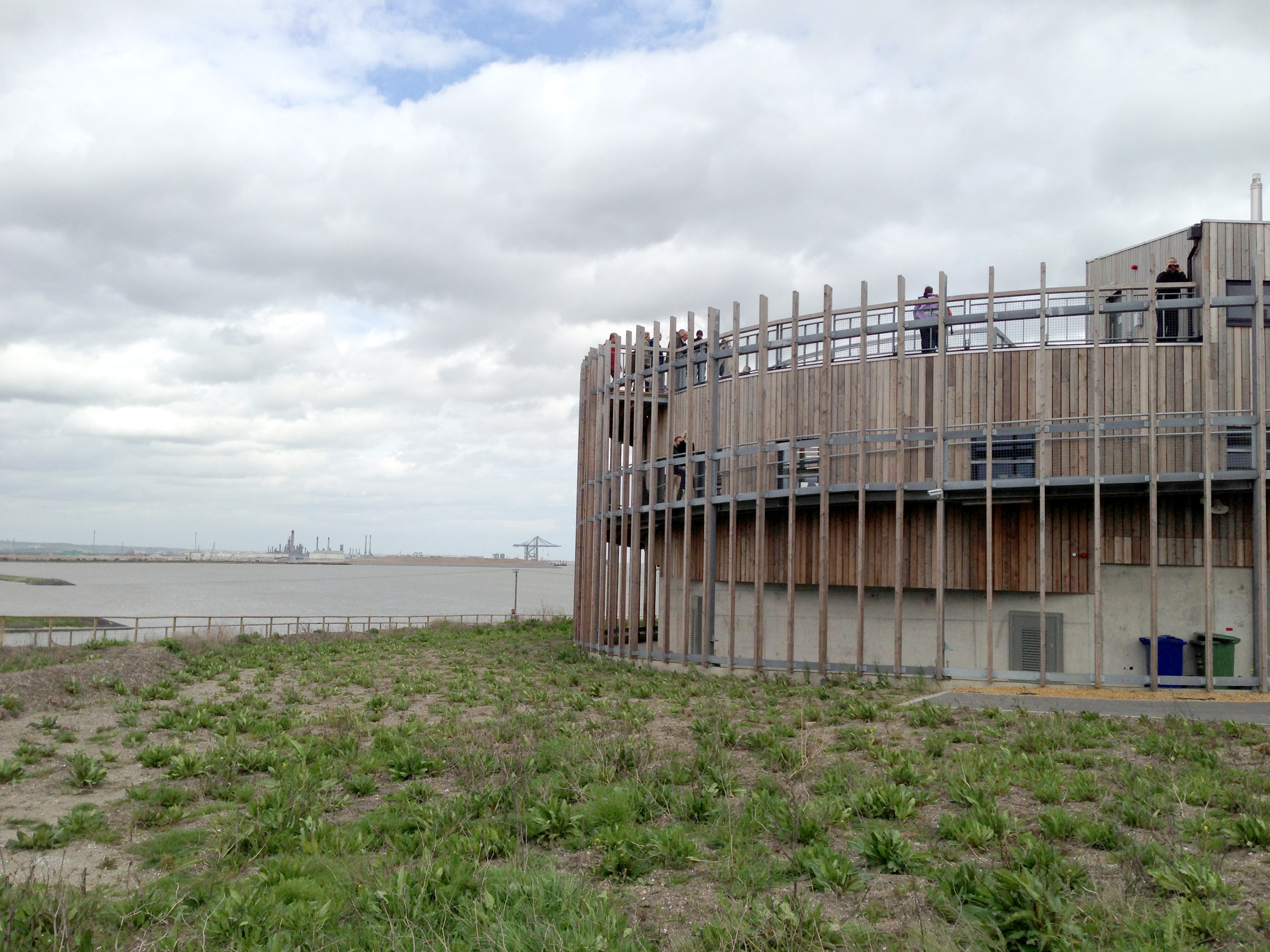
Cory Environmental Centre, Essex

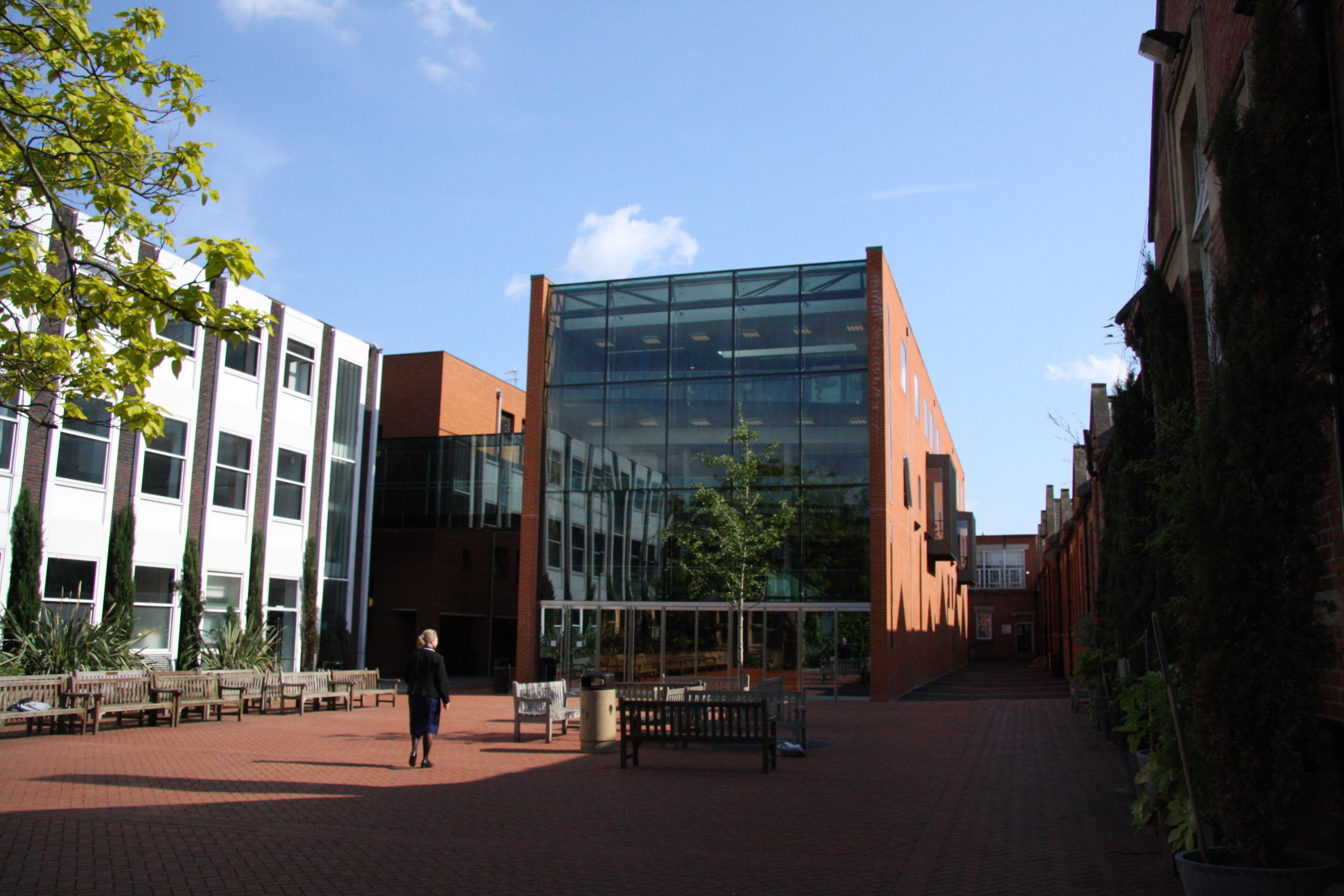
Latymer Performing Arts Centre, Hammersmith, London

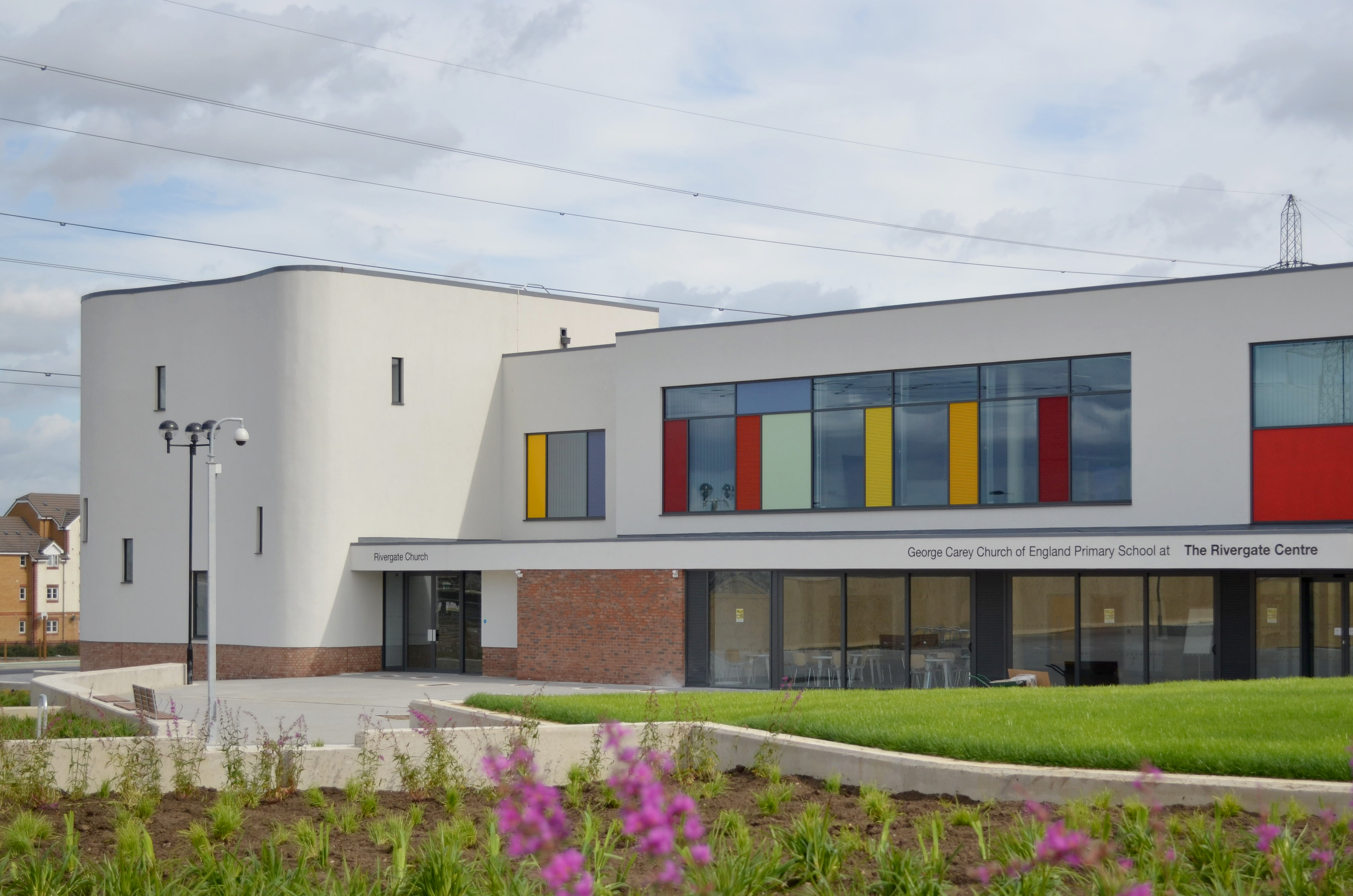
Rivergate Centre, Barking, London

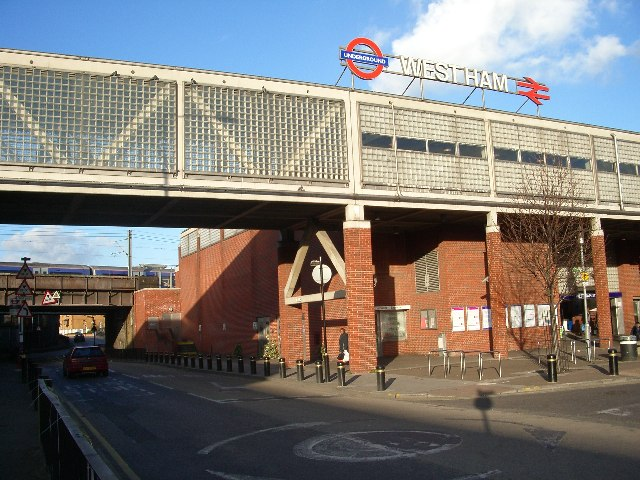
West Ham Station, Jubilee Line Extension

=== 2015 ===
- Civic Trust Award Commendation for Bow School

=== 2013 ===
- RICS East of England Design and Innovation Award for Cory Environmental Centre
- RICS East of England Leisure and Tourism Award for Cory Environmental Centre
- RICS East of England Project of the Year Award for Cory Environmental Centre
- Shortlisted for RIBA East Award for Cory Environmental Centre
- Civic Trust Community Benefit Award for Cory Environmental Centre, Commendation

=== 2012 ===
- RICS Regeneration Highly Commended Award for Rivergate Centre, Barking
- RICS Community Benefit Highly Commended Award for Platform, Islington

=== 2011 ===
- RIBA South Conservation Award for No.1 Smithery, Chatham
- Camden and Islington Business Award for Best Property Business
- RIBA Award for No.1 Smithery, Chatham Historic Dockyard
- Regeneration and Renewal Awards Highly Commended for No.1 Smithery, Chatham Historic Dockyard

=== 2010 ===
- Brick Award, Best Outdoor Space for Corfield Court, St John's College
- LABC Regional Award, Best Technical Design for Corfield Court, St John's College
- RIBA Award for Edward Alleyn Building, Alleyn's School
- Building Award Highly Commended for Architectural Practice of the Year
- Civic Trust Award Commendation for Dennis Sciama Building, University of Portsmouth
