= Mucking Marshes Landfill =

Landfill site near London, England

Coordinates: 51.49°N 0.43°E

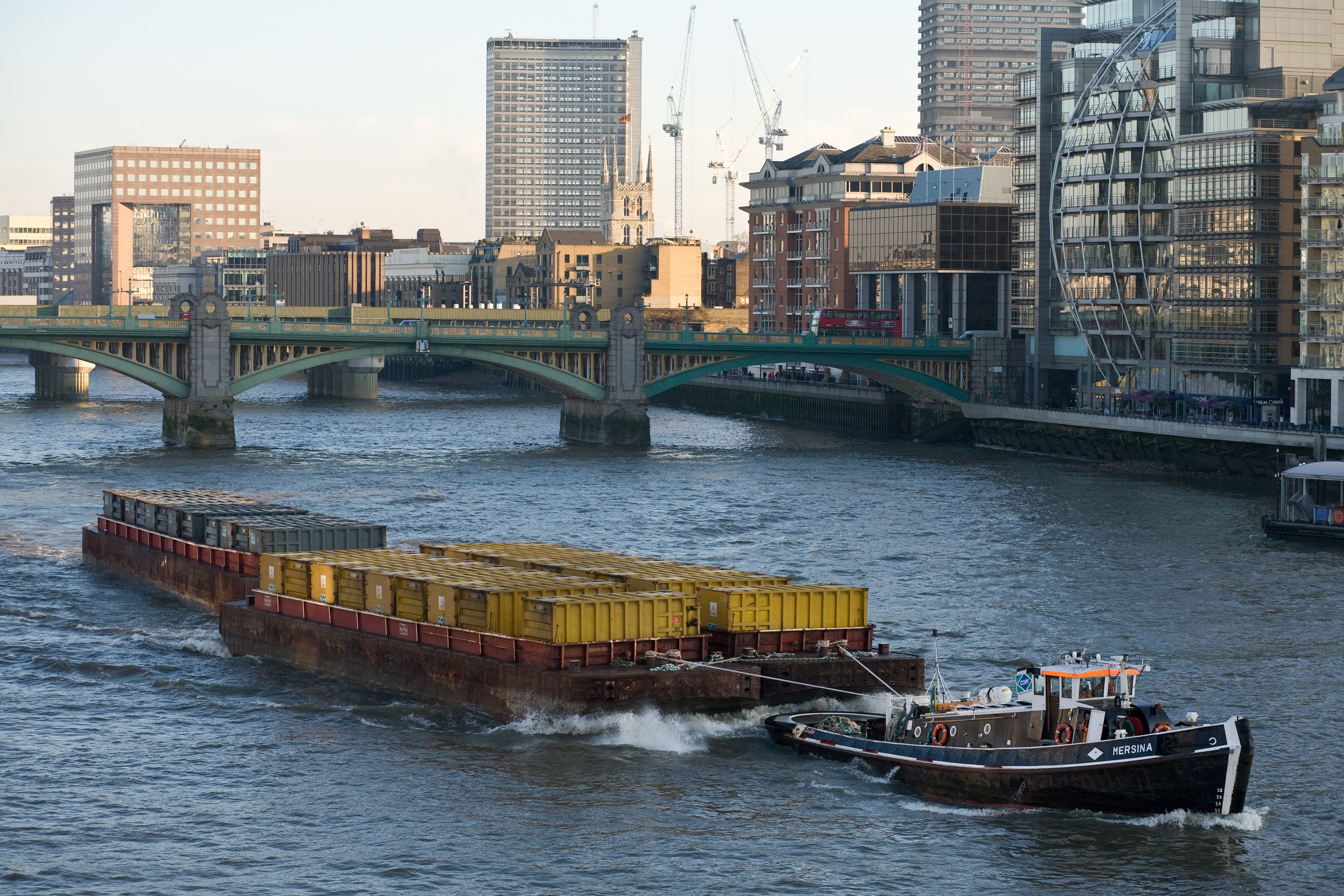
Barges towed by a tugboat on the River Thames, seen in 2009

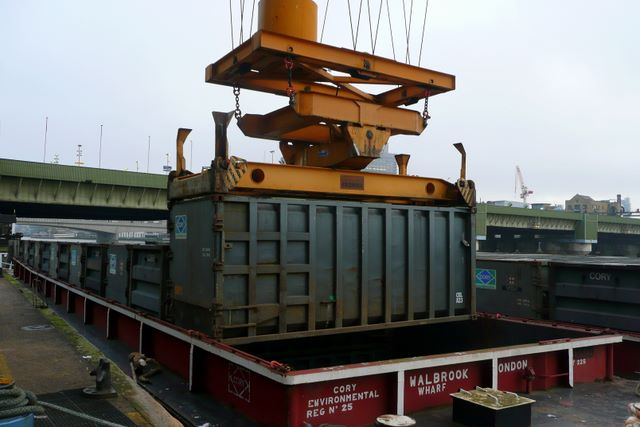
Containers of waste destined for Mucking Marshes Landfill are loaded onto a barge in central London

Mucking Marshes landfill was a major landfill site servicing London, close to the hamlet of Mucking, in Thurrock, Essex. Covering hundreds of acres of former gravel quarry, it was one of the largest landfills in Western Europe and had been filled for decades with municipal and commercial waste floated thirty miles down the River Thames in barges to Mucking Wharf. The barges, each carrying dozens of distinctive yellow containers, were a familiar, though rarely commented-upon, sight along the Thames through Central London. Once the barges had travelled 30 miles (48 km) downstream from Walbrook Wharf (or further upstream at Wandsworth), mechanical cranes at Mucking Wharf unloaded the containers onto trucks. The trucks made their way up the artificial mound created by decades of garbage compaction that still towers over the surrounding flat landscape. Flocks of seagulls and other scavenging estuarine birds were a familiar sight as the trucks disgorged their contents.

The former landfill site itself, although it dominates the village of Mucking, is guarded and surrounded by a perimeter fence more than four miles (6 km) long. Cory Environmental, the operators of the site, gated off Mucking Wharf Road so that views of the Thames meeting the North Sea could only be accessed via a circuitous footpath through the neighbouring village of East Tilbury.

== Conversion to a nature park ==
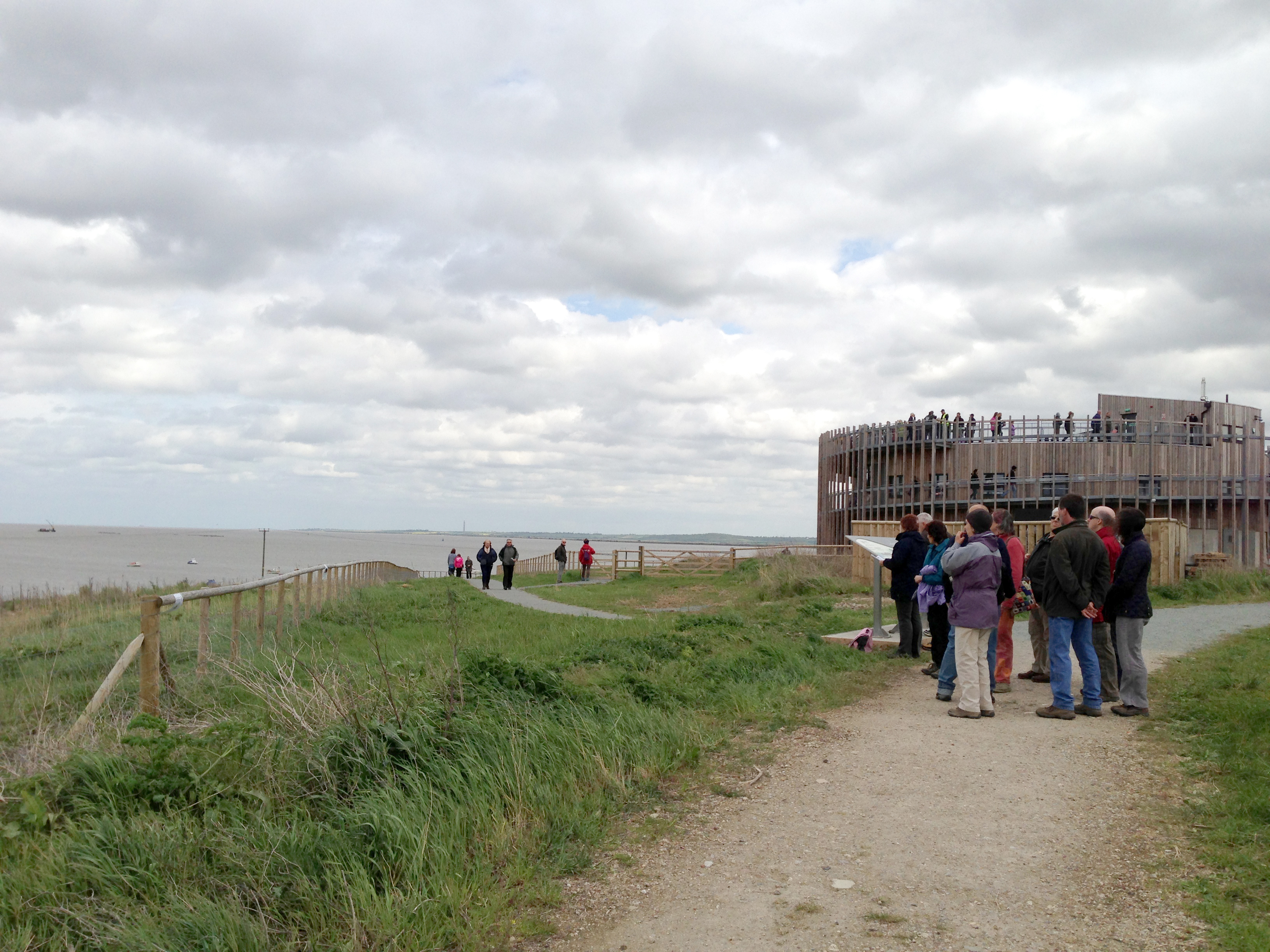
The new Cory Environmental Centre adjacent to the Thames Estuary

Changes in London governance, including the creation of the Greater London Authority under Ken Livingstone, led to indications of a reassessment of London's waste strategy based more on recycling and less on landfill sites like Mucking Marshes. However, in 2007, Mucking Marshes Landfill was granted an extension to receive London's waste until 2010.

In 2012, the site was reclaimed for community and environmental use in a project involving The Cory Environmental Trust, DP World port, and the Essex Wildlife Trust working together to create the Thurrock Thameside Nature Park. This is a 120-acre (49 ha) wildlife site open to the public, expanding to 845 acres (342 ha) over the next few years, to help establish and protect wildlife and bird populations and environments. The site also houses the recently completed Cory Environmental Trust Visitor Centre, a drum-shaped, timber-clad building designed by van Heyningen and Haward Architects. The reserve and the new building were opened on 11 May 2013 by Sir David Attenborough, who described the building as 'revolutionary'.

== Power generation ==
The decomposition of organic matter within the landfill generates a gas containing up to about 50 per cent methane. This landfill gas is collected by a network of pipes and used in on-site power stations. Mucking Gas 2 Landfill Scheme has an output 3.8 MW and Mucking Gas 3 Scheme has an output 3.9 MW. Electricity is fed into the National Grid. It is envisaged that landfill gas will continue to be produced for about 30 years.
