= Cory (company) =

British recycling and waste management company

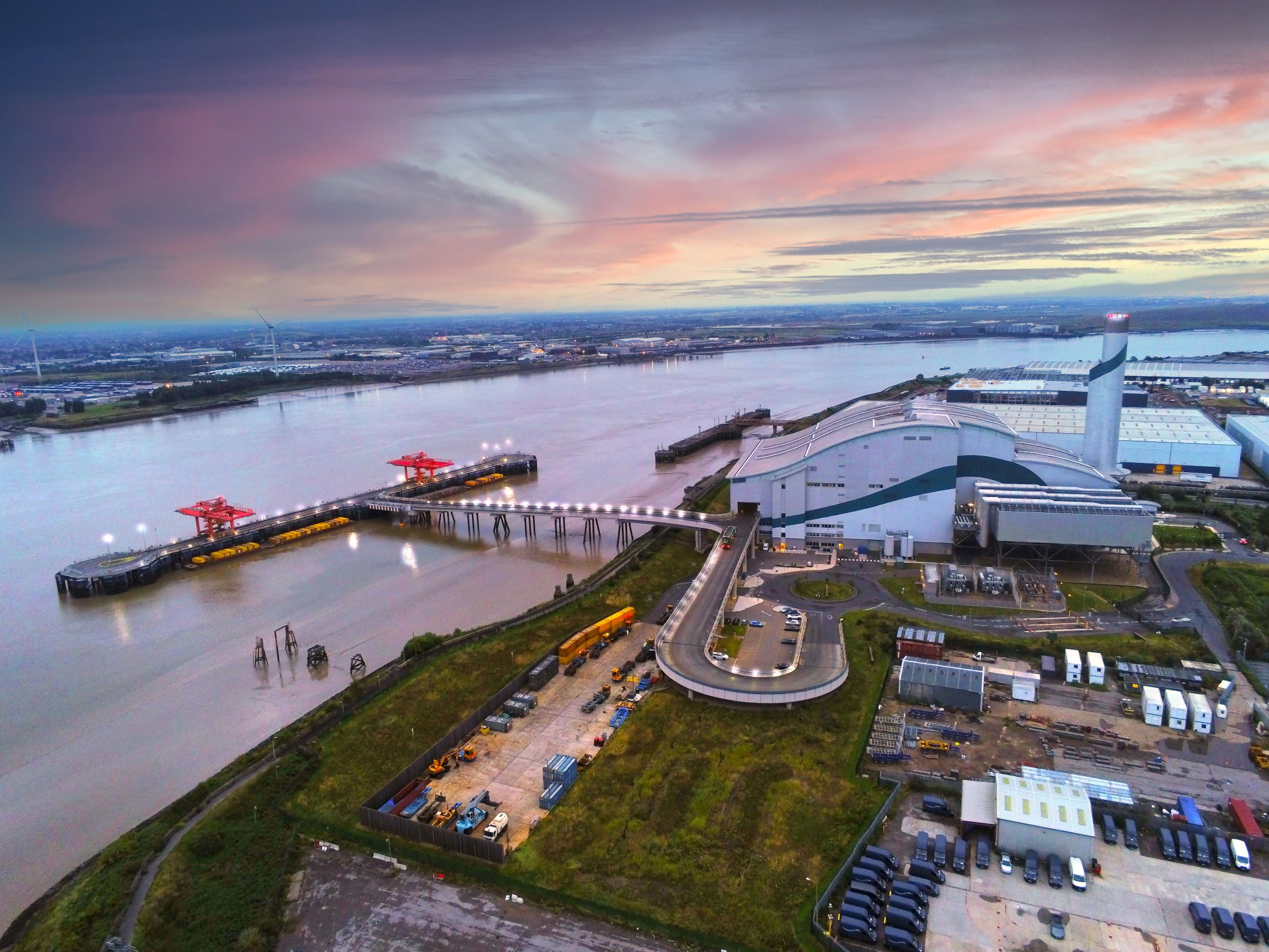
- Riverside 1 EfW facility, Belvedere
- Type: Private
- Industry: Waste management
- Founded: 1896
- Headquarters: London, UK
- Key people: Dougie Sutherland, (CEO)
- Revenue: £141.4 million (2021)
- Number of employees: 400+
- Parent: Cory Group
- Website: Cory

Cory is a recycling and waste management company based in London.

Originally founded as William Cory & Son in 1896, the company has operated vessels on the River Thames for more than 125 years, transporting a range of commodities and materials including coal, oil, aggregates and waste. Ships from Cory's fleet supported Britain's war efforts in both world wars, with 30 ships being lost during the conflicts. From the 1980s onwards, the business has become increasingly focused on waste management.

== Locations and operations ==
Cory's site footprint spans the length of the Thames from Wandsworth in the west to Gravesend in the east. The company operates:

- Five waste transfer stations providing river access for London and the South East, including eight London Boroughs: Hammersmith and Fulham, the Royal Borough of Kensington and Chelsea, Wandsworth, Lambeth, the City of London, Tower Hamlets, Barking and Dagenham, and Bexley.
- A fleet of five tugs and more than 50 barges transporting waste on the river. Cory's river-based infrastructure for transporting waste is unique in the UK and removes 100,000 truck movements from the roads every year. Cory maintains and repairs these vessels, as well as third-party vessels, at sites in Charlton and Gravesend.
- Recycling sorting facilities in Wandsworth and Barking.
- An incinerator bottom ash (IBA) transfer station at the Port of Tilbury.
- Riverside 1, one of the UK's largest energy from waste (EfW) facilities, in Belvedere, London Borough of Bexley. The facility processed 782,000 tonnes of non-recyclable waste in 2021, diverting it from landfill and saving 133,000 tonnes of CO_{2} from being released into the atmosphere. In the process, 532 GWh of baseload electricity was generated and 170,000 tonnes of ash were turned into aggregate for construction. (As of April 2025, a second EfW facility, Riverside 2, was under construction at Belvedere.)

== History ==
=== Coal and refuse ===
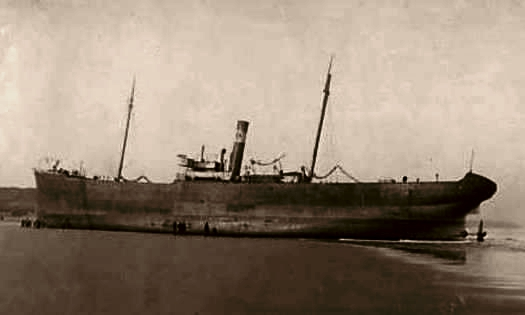
SS Nellie Wise aground at Hartlepool in 1908

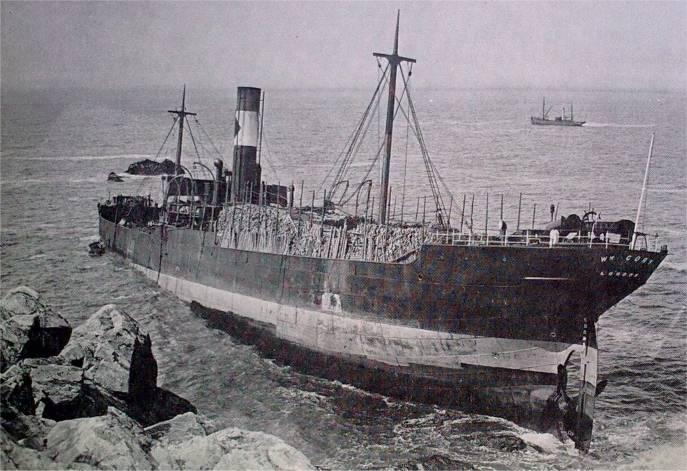
SS William Cory aground at Pendeen in 1910

The company was founded in London in 1896 as William Cory and Son Ltd. Cory was formed from the merger of eight companies in the coal trade and had a comprehensive business in transporting and supplying five million tonnes of coal per year to trade and domestic customers in London. Cory had a fleet of 2,500 railway wagons and also operated lighters on the River Thames. Rather than operate its lighters unladen on their return journeys from delivering coal, Cory used them to carry refuse from London to be dumped in the marshlands of Essex and Kent.

After the turn of the 20th century, Cory started to provide social housing for some of its workforce.

Cory ships had brown upper works above hull level. The funnel was black with a broad white band, and a large black diamond on the white band. The house flag was red with a large white or cream diamond in the middle.

- In 1900 S.P. Austin & Co of Sunderland built the 1,780 GRT coaster SS Heston for the company. On 24 May 1902 she was en route from Decido to Rotterdam laden with iron ore when she was involved in a collision with SS Castillo and sank in the Bay of Biscay southwest of Point Penmarc'h in Brittany.
- In 1902 S.P. Austin & Co. built the 1,191 GRT collier SS Caenwood for the company. On 21 November 1905 she ran aground and was wrecked in the North Sea off the North Landing of Flamborough Head.
- In 1896 Cory bought the 867 GRT coaster SS F.T. Barry, which Backhouse and Dixon of Middlesbrough had built in 1872. On 23 June 1906 she was involved in a collision in the North Sea with SS Tynesider, was beached on Gunfleet Sands off Clacton-on-Sea and became a total loss.
- In 1896 Cory bought the 1,053 GRT coaster SS Nellie Wise, which Denton Gray & Co of West Hartlepool had built in 1873. On 8 January 1908 while en route from London to the River Tyne she ran aground on Blackhall Rocks 3 nautical miles (5.6 km) northwest of Hartlepool. She was refloated but sold for scrap.
- In 1909 S.P. Austin & Co. built the 2,660 GRT coaster SS William Cory for the company. She ran aground at Pendeen in Cornwall and was wrecked in September 1910.

=== First World War ===
In World War I Cory mobilised as D Company, 6th Battalion of The Buffs (commonly known as Cory's Unit) and many died fighting in France. It also mobilised its boats in support of the war effort, losing 17 ships during the war:

- SS Deptford was a 1,208 GRT collier built by Blyth Shipbuilding & Drydock Co. in 1912. She was a flatiron, meaning that she had a low-profile superstructure, hinged funnel and hinged or telescopic mast to pass under low bridges on the River Thames upriver form the Pool of London. On 24 February 1915 she was en route from Granton to Chatham carrying coal for naval bunkering when she was sunk by a mine in the Scarborough minefield that the German cruiser SMS Kolberg had laid during the raid on Scarborough, Hartlepool and Whitby on 15 December 1914. One crew member was lost.
- SS Hadley was a 1,777 GRT coaster built by S.P. Austin & Co. in 1901. On 27 December 1915 she was en route from Newcastle-upon-Tyne to London when a mine laid by the German minelaying submarine SM UC-3 sank her in the north sea three miles (5 km) from the Shipwash lightship, which is southwest of Orford Ness. All her crew were saved.
- SS Denewood was a 1,221 GRT coaster built by S.P. Austin & Co. in 1905. On 26 May 1916 she was carrying coal from the River Tyne to London when she was sunk in the North Sea by a mine off Sizewell. All her crew were saved.
- SS Brentwood was a 1,192 GRT collier built by S.P. Austin & Co. in 1904. On 12 January 1917 she was sunk in the North Sea by a mine laid by the German minelaying submarine SM UC-63. She sank off Saltwick Nab near Whitby with the loss of her second mate and a fireman (stoker). SS Togston rescued the survivors and landed them at Sunderland.
- SS Hurstwood was a 1,229 GRT collier built by S.P. Austin & Co. in 1906. On 5 February 1917 she was steaming from London to Newcastle-upon-Tyne in ballast when the German submarine SM UB-34 torpedoed and sank her off Whitby. The chief engineer and a fireman (stoker) were killed in the explosion and two men were seriously injured. 11 survivors got away in a boat and were rescued by the armed trawler HMS Swallow but one of the injured, a donkeyman, died of his injuries.
- SS Harberton was a 1,443 GRT collier built by S.P. Austin & Co. in 1894 for J.& C. Harrison of London. On 29 March 1917 she left Blyth for London laden with coal. Neither she nor her master and 15 crew were seen again. She is presumed to have been either torpedoed by an enemy submarine or sunk by an enemy mine. Her date of loss is recorded as 30 March but this is conjectural and her wreck has not yet been found.
- SS Sir Francis was a 1,991 GRT collier built by S.P. Austin & Co. in 1910. On 7 June 1917 she was steaming northwards to the River Tyne when the German submarine SM UB-21 sank her with two torpedoes off Cloughton. Her master and nine crew were lost, SS Dryade and the Cory ship SS Vernon (see below) rescued 12 survivors, and the latter landed all the survivors at South Shields.
- SS Vernon was a 982-ton coaster built by John Blumer & Co. of Sunderland in 1878. On 7 June 1917 she took part in the rescue of survivors from the Cory collier SS Sir Francis (see above). On 31 August 1917 in the North Sea off Spurn, the German submarine SM UB-30 torpedoed and sank Vernon and one of her crew was lost.
- SS Hockwold was a 1,492 GRT collier built by S.P. Austin & Co. in 1911. On 8 September 1917 she in the western approaches to the English Channel when she was involved in a collision with SS Intent southwest of The Lizard and sank with the loss of 10 men including her master. Intent rescued two survivors and recovered the body of the master.
- SS Harrow was a 1,777 GRT coaster built by S.P. Austin & Co. in 1900. On the evening of 8 September 1917 she was in the North Sea steaming from Granton to London with a cargo of coal as part of a convoy. A few miles northwest of North Cheek of Robin Hood's Bay the German submarine SM UB-41 torpedoed her, killing the first mate and a gunner and sinking her. One of the convoy's armed trawler escorts rescued her remaining crew and transferred them to a motor launch that landed them at Whitby.
- SS Ocean was a 1,442 GRT collier built by S.P. Austin & Co. for Lambert Bros. Ltd. of London in 1894 and Cory had subsequently bought from her first owners. On 23 November 1917 the German submarine SM UB-21 torpedoed and sank her in the North Sea off Saltburn-by-the-Sea. All her complement of 17 crew and two gunners were saved.
- SS Highgate was a 1,780 GRT collier built by S.P. Austin & Co. in 1899. On 7 December 1917 she was carrying 2,380 tons of coal from the River Tyne to London when the German Type UB III submarine SM UB-75 torpedoed and sank her about 2.5 miles (4 km) off the South Cheek of Robin Hood's Bay. All 20 crew were rescued by a motor patrol boat and landed at Whitby.
- SS The Buffs was a 3,431 GRT collier built by S.P. Austin & Co. in 1917, so named to mark Cory's connection with the regiment. However, in 1920 Cory's renamed the ship SS Corland. She survived the First World War but was sunk in the Second World War (See below).
- SS Corsham was a 2,797 GRT cargo ship newly built by S.P. Austin & Co. in 1918. On 8 March 1918 she was steaming from London to the River Tyne when the German submarine SM UB-40 torpedoed and sank her in the North Sea off Loftus. 12 reached her lifeboat and five were saved from the water by motor patrol boats, but nine men were lost, mostly from hypothermia or drowning.
- SS Crayford was a 1,209 GRT collier built by Blyth Shipbuilding & Drydock Co. in 1911. On 13 March 1918 she was crossing the North Sea from Methil in Scotland to Christiania (now Oslo) in Norway with a cargo of coke when the German submarine SM U-46 torpedoed and sank her about 110 miles (180 km) off Skudesneshavn with the loss of the chief engineer.
- SS Lady Cory-Wright was a 2,516 GRT collier built by S.P. Austin & Co. in 1906. The War Department requisitioned her for the Royal Fleet Auxiliary in August 1914 as the mine carrier RFA Lady Cory-Wright. On 26 March 1918 she was steaming from Plymouth to Malta with a cargo of mines when the German submarine SM UC-17 torpedoed and sank her about 12 miles (19 km) or 14 miles (23 km) off The Lizard with the loss of 39 lives. Only one crew member survived.

During the war Cory bought R. and J.H. Rea, which both expanded its tug, barge and coastal collier fleets but also gave Cory a presence in the ports of Bristol and Southampton. After the war Cory expanded further; buying the Mercantile Lighterage Company in 1920, followed by Mellonie and Goulder of Ipswich and several other companies in 1928.

=== Second World War ===
In the Second World War fuel supplies were vital to the war effort. Cory colliers sailed in coastal convoys and 13 of them were lost.

- SS Corbrae was a 1,788 GRT coaster launched in 1935 by the Burntisland Shipbuilding Company of Fife. The War Department requisitioned her into the Royal Navy as the minesweeper HMS Corbrae. After her naval service she was returned to Cory, who in 1948 sold her to new owners who renamed her Kinburn. Burntisland Shipbuilding Co. built a new MV Corbrae for Cory in 1952.
- SS Corburn was a 1,786 GRT coaster and Corbrae's sister ship, also launched in 1935 by the Burntisland Shipbuilding Co. The War Department requisitioned her into the Royal Navy as the minesweeper HMS Corburn. On 21 May 1940 a mine sank Corburn in the English Channel off Le Havre.
- SS Corhaven was a 991 GRT coaster built by S.P. Austin & Co. in 1933. On 26 July 1940 she was in a convoy in the Straits of Dover that was attacked by Junkers Ju 87 dive-bombers. Five ships including Corhaven were sunk and five more were damaged.
- SS Corbrook was a 1,729 GRT collier built by Cowpen Drydock and Shipbuilding of Northumberland in 1929. She was torpedoed and sunk in the North Sea off Cromer on 9 September 1940.
- SS Corheath was a 1,096 GRT collier built by S.P. Austin & Co. in 1936. On 24 January 1941 she was off the coast of Kent en route from Portsmouth to Blyth when she was sunk by a mine with the loss of three lives.
- SS Corduff was a 2,345 GRT coaster built by Swan Hunter in 1923. On 7 March 1941 the torpedo boat S-28 attacked and sank her in the North Sea off Mundesley.
- SS Cordene was a 2,345 GRT coaster built by Swan Hunter in 1924 and the sister ship of SS Corduff. On 9 August 1941 enemy aircraft attacked and sank her in the North Sea off Mundesley.
- SS Corfield was a 1,791 GRT coaster built by Burntisland Shipbuilding Co. in 1937. She was commissioned into the Royal Navy as the minesweeper HMS Corfield. On 8 September 1941 she was sunk in the North Sea by a mine off Saltfleet.
- SS Corhampton was a 2,495 GRT collier built by S.P. Austin & Co. in 1933. On 15 November 1941 she was en route from Hartlepool to Rochester when German aircraft bombed her in the North Sea about 26 nautical miles (48 km) off Spurn. She sank the following day.
- SS Cormarsh was a 2,848 GRT collier built by the Burntisland Shipbuilding Co. in 1939. On 29 November 1941 she was sunk in the North Sea by a mine off Blakeney Point. Burntisland Shipbuilding Co. launched a replacement Cormarsh in 1943.
- SS Cormead was a 2,848 GRT collier built by the Burntisland Shipbuilding Co. in 1939, the sister ship of SS Cormarsh. On Christmas Day 1941 Cormead was sunk in the North Sea by a mine off Hopton-on-Sea.
- SS Corfen was a 1,848 GRT coaster. She was sunk in the North Sea by a mine off Frinton-on-Sea on 3 January 1942. Hall, Russell & Company of Aberdeen built a replacement SS Corfen in 1944.
- SS Corland, formerly SS The Buffs, was bombed and sunk at anchor in the North Sea off Spurn by enemy aircraft on 5 February 1942.
- SS Cormount was a 2,841 GRT collier built by Burntisland Shipbuilding Co. in 1936. On 13 November 1943 she was damaged in the North Sea by a mine off Aldeburgh. She was taken in tow but sank before reaching safety.

=== Cory since 1945 ===
The Second World War was not the end of Cory's losses at sea.

- Swan Hunter built the 2,373 GRT collier SS Hopecrest in 1918. Cory bought her from her original owners in 1919 and renamed her SS Corcrest. On 24 June 1949 she struck a submerged object, ran aground and was wrecked off the mouth of the River Deben in Suffolk.
- S.P. Austin & Co built the 2,374 GRT collier SS Corchester in 1927. On 19 February 1956 she was en route from London to Hartlepool in rough sea, a blizzard and no visibility off the Haisboro' Light. The 6,986 Ellerman Lines cargo ship City of Sidney sliced Corchester in two through no. 1 hold and sank her. Eight of Corchester's crew were lost, of whom six had been in her forecastle accommodation. Survivors were rescued by another Cory ship, SS Cormull.

After the war, Cory began mining the stone needed for aggregates to rebuild parts of London and putting them on empty barges. The holes left in the ground became landfills in Erith and East Tilbury. This was the start of Cory's transition from moving fuel to transporting waste and building materials.

During the post-war period, Cory also began transporting fuel oil as well as coal following the introduction of the Clean Air Act in 1956. By the 1950s Cory was transporting and supplying fuel oil as well as coal. In 1956 Cory started to develop a fleet of barges designed specifically to carry refuse rather than coal. Cory had its own barge-building yard, which produced more than 400 such vessels between 1962 and 1972. Oil-fired central heating grew in popularity such that by 1972 Cory was supplying 216 million imperial gallons (980 megalitres) per year to domestic customers.

In the 1960s and 1970s William Cory was operating general and refrigerated road haulage out of Palmers Wharf, Deptford. The colours were white with the black lozenge. Later on it was taken over by Ocean and renamed McGregor Cory Cargo Services and the vehicles became red. They gradually got involved with the emerging container traffic and worked for OCL who were taking over refrigerated imports from New Zealand and Australia. As containers were mostly arriving in Tilbury docks, MCCS moved to Thurrock and Barking, Essex. This was the final end of the link with Deptford.

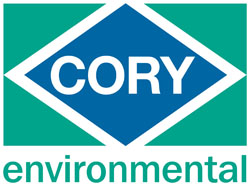

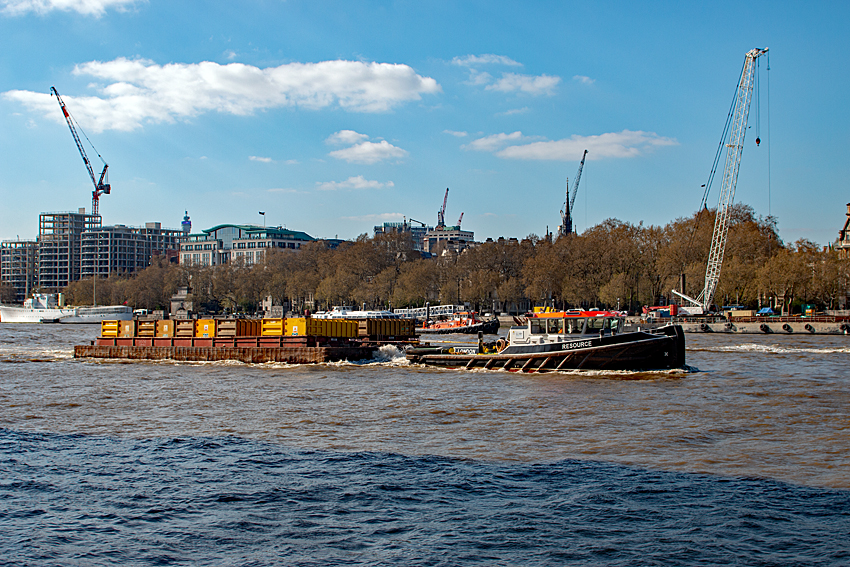
Cory tug Resource towing barges of waste down the Thames

In 1972 Ocean Group plc bought Cory, which then acquired Surridge, which owned Mucking Marshes Landfill, then the second-largest landfill site in the UK. In 1979 Cory bought Thames and General Lighterage, making Cory the largest waste carrier on the Thames. In the 1980s Cory withdrew from coal and oil distribution to concentrate on waste transport and disposal. In 1981 two Cory group companies were merged to form Cory Waste Management. It won a tender to transport and dispose of half a million tonnes of waste a year for the Greater London Council. This saw the launch of the containerised waste transportation business that operates today. Cory Environmental Municipal Services Ltd was formed in 1989 and the two companies were merged as Cory Environmental in 1990. At this stage, London was producing 29 million tonnes of waste per year and disposing only 400,000 tonnes of it within its own boundaries. By the late 1990s, Mucking landfill site was receiving 1.5 million tonnes of London's waste.

In 1997 Cory Environmental grew by buying Local Authority Waste Disposal Companies from Essex County Council and Gloucestershire County Council. In 1999 Cory bought Parkhill Reclamation, increasing Cory's presence in the West Midlands and North West England. Since 2000, Cory's operations have focused on waste management. It signed a long-term contract with London's Western Riverside Waste Authority in 2002, which included the development of an 84,000 tonnes-per-annum materials recycling facility in Wandsworth.

In 2000 Ocean Group plc merged with NFC plc to form Exel plc, which in 2005 sold Cory Environmental to Montagu Private Equity. In March 2007 Montagu sold Cory to a consortium of investors consisting of ABN Amro Global Infrastructure Fund, Finpro SGPS and Santander Private Equity.

In 2010, Mucking stopped receiving London's waste and was later reclaimed for community and environmental use to create the Thurrock Thameside Nature Discovery Park.

In 2012, Cory Environmental was awarded an eight-year contract to provide the waste collection services throughout the county of Cornwall, and opened the Riverside 1 energy from waste (EfW) facility, one of the UK's largest EfW facilities, in Belvedere, Kent.

In June 2015, it was announced that Biffa had bought the Cory waste collection business, Cory Environmental Municipal Services Limited, for £13.5 million. In 2016, the company was rebranded as Cory Riverside Energy. In 2017, the business completed a major restructure and refinance, having sold its collections, waste brokerage and landfill businesses, and in 2021 it was rebranded simply as Cory.

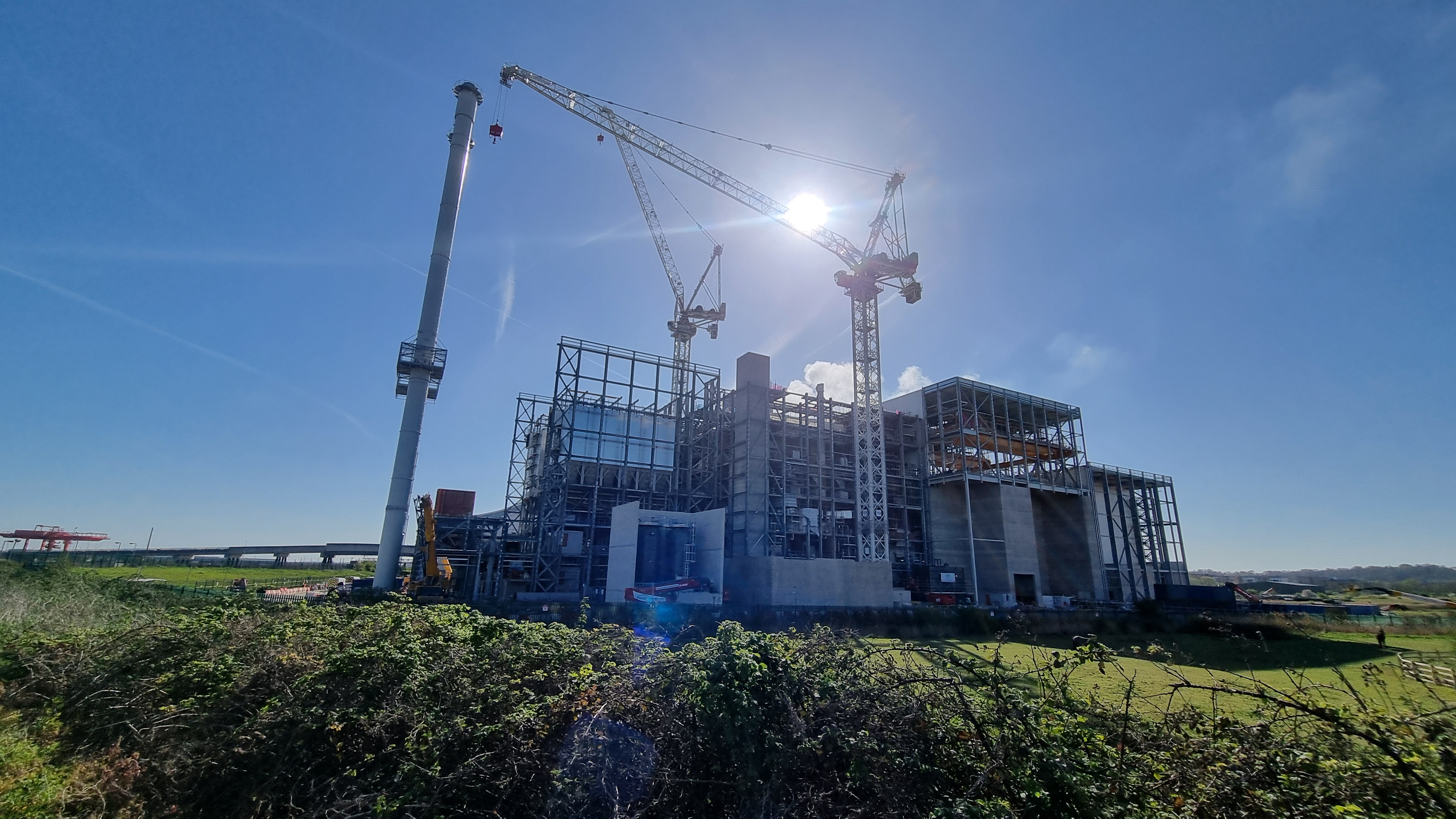
Riverside 2 energy-from-waste plant under construction (April 2025)

In 2020, Cory received planning permission to build a second EfW facility, Riverside 2, adjacent to its existing one in Belvedere. The company is also developing a district heat network at Belvedere with Vattenfall. Construction of Riverside 2 started in early 2023 and the plant is scheduled to be completed and operational in 2026.

In 2021, Cory announced plans for one of Europe's largest Carbon Capture and Storage (CCS) facilities in Belvedere, with a planning application for the facility following in late 2023. The proposed development was expected to take up to 11.7% of the 25.5 hectares of land at the adjacent Crossness Nature Reserve. A campaign group and petition was established in December 2023 to oppose the development. The petition generated 2,790 signatures. In June 2024, the campaign group sought to raise £8000 to fight the plans.

== See also ==
- List of incinerators in the UK
- Waste authorities in Greater London
- List of waste management companies
