= Atlantica (company) =

British sustainable infrastructure company

Atlantica Sustainable Infrastructure
- Company type: Private
- Traded as: Nasdaq: AY
- Industry: Sustainable infrastructure; Renewable energy
- Founded: 2013; 13 years ago
- Headquarters: London, United Kingdom
- Key people: Santiago Seage (CEO); Francisco Martinez-Davis (CFO)
- Revenue: US$1.1 billion (2023)
- Number of employees: 1,400 (2023)
- Website: www.atlantica.com

Atlantica Sustainable Infrastructure is a UK-based sustainable infrastructure company headquartered in London. The company operates a diverse portfolio of assets, including renewable energy, efficient natural gas and electric transmission lines across several countries.

== History ==
Atlantica was founded in 2013, established to manage a portfolio of long-term contracted energy and environmental infrastructure assets. The company went public on the NASDAQ in 2014, initially focusing on solar power plants, transmission lines, and water assets. Santiago Seage has served as Atlantica's CEO since its founding in 2013, with a brief departure in 2015.

In 2020, the company rebranded as Atlantica Sustainable Infrastructure to reflect its growing focus on renewable energy and sustainability.

In 2021, Atlantica further diversified its portfolio by acquiring the Coso Geothermal Plant in California, which provides base-load renewable energy. In the same year, Atlantica purchased a 49% stake in a wind portfolio with a total capacity of 596 MW for $196.5 million. Known as Vento II, the portfolio includes four wind assets located across Illinois, Texas, Oregon, and Minnesota.

By the end of 2023, Atlantica's renewable energy portfolio comprised 2,171 MW in operation. In 2024, the company expanded its portfolio further by acquiring two wind assets in Scotland, adding a combined capacity of 32 MW to its operations.

In December 2024, Atlantica was acquired by Energy Capital Partners and a group of co-investors, leading to its delisting from the NASDAQ.

== Operations ==
As of 2024, Atlantica manages assets with a total installed capacity of 2.2 gigawatts (GW) of renewable energy, including solar, wind, and geothermal power plants. The company's portfolio spans several regions: in North America, Atlantica operates the Solana and Mojave solar power plants and holds a 49% stake in a 596 MW wind energy portfolio. In Europe, Atlantica operates renewable energy projects, particularly in Spain. In South America, Atlantica owns several wind farms in Uruguay.

== Acquisition ==
In 2024, Energy Capital Partners (ECP), a U.S.-based private investor in energy transition together with a group of co-investors, announced its plan to acquire Atlantica for $2.555 billion, with a purchase price of $22 per share.

On May 27, 2024, Atlantica entered into an agreement pursuant to which 100% of its shares would be acquired by Energy Capital Partners and co-investors. In August 2024, Atlantica’s shareholders approved the acquisition, with 97% voting in favor at the general meeting. The acquisition completed in the fourth quarter of 2024.

In December 2024, Atlantica Sustainable Infrastructure completed its acquisition by California Buyer Limited, a subsidiary of Energy Capital Partners and co-investors, through a scheme of arrangement under English law. Following the transaction, Atlantica's ordinary shares were delisted from the Nasdaq Global Select Market.
