= Energy Capital Partners =

American energy investment firm

Energy Capital Partners Management, LP
- Trade name: ECP
- Company type: Subsidiary
- Industry: Investment management
- Founded: April 2005; 21 years ago
- Founders: Doug Kimmelman; Thomas Lane; Scott Helm
- Headquarters: Summit, New Jersey, U.S.
- Number of locations: 6
- Products: Private equity; Private credit; Infrastructure fund; Mezzanine capital
- AUM: US$18.5 billion (March 2023)
- Number of employees: 81 (2023)
- Parent: Bridgepoint Group
- Website: ecpgp.com

Energy Capital Partners Management, LP (ECP) is an American investment firm headquartered in Summit, New Jersey. It focuses on investments in the energy sector. The firm has additional offices in New York City, Houston, San Diego, Fort Lauderdale and Seoul.

In August 2024, ECP merged with Bridgepoint Group to form a private assets investment platform.

== Background ==
ECP was founded in April 2005 by Doug Kimmelman, Thomas Lane and Scott Helm. The three were previously senior executives at Goldman Sachs in its investment banking division. ECP focuses in investments in power generation, renewable energy and energy storage assets. It was originally based in Short Hills, New Jersey and later moved its headquarters to Summit.

== History ==
In January 2007, ECP raised $2.25 billion for its debut fund, Energy Capital Partners I. At the time it was one of the largest debut funds ever raised.

In September 2009, ECP formed Summit Midstream Partners, a platform company to invest in North American gas infrastructure. In September 2012, Summit Midstream Partners held an initial public offering on the New York Stock Exchange and in September 2015, ECP was seeking buyers for its ownership stake. Later on ECP exited its ownership of Summit Midstream Partners.

In July 2011, it was reported that The Carlyle Group was in talks to acquire ECP. It came as a surprise, due to Carlyle's longstanding relationship with Riverstone Holdings where the two had worked on multiple deals together. However, in the end the deal did not proceed.

In August 2017, Dyal Capital acquired a minority interest of less than 20% in ECP for below $500 million. The transaction valued ECP at less than $2.5 billion at the time. The cash injection gave ECP a financial cushion for more volatile periods that may not be favorable to fundraising. Some of it was used to pay retention bonuses to its employees as well as buying out the ownership equity of Lane.

In November 2022, it was reported that Bridgepoint Group was in talks to acquire ECP for $1 billion. It was speculated that the acquisition would allow ECP to establish a presence in Europe. On September 6, 2023, it was announced that both sides agreed to the deal involving cash and stock which would close within four to six months. In August 2024, ECP merged with Bridgepoint Group to form a private assets investment platform.

In June 2023, ECP established ECP ForeStar, a $2.5 billion credit strategy that focuses on climate change and sustainability. ECP recruited former leaders of Global Infrastructure Partners' credit business to lead the venture.

In October 2024, ECP and Kohlberg Kravis Roberts formed a partnership to invest a combined $50 billion in data center and power generation projects to support the development of artificial intelligence. ECP formed a further $25 billion partnership with ADQ in March 2025 to invest in U.S. power generation and energy infrastructure for data centers and AI projects. The partnership aims to provide 25GW of new power capacity.

== Acquisitions ==
In 2007, ECP acquired a small stake in Energy Future Holdings as part of an investor consortium buyout led by Kohlberg Kravis Roberts and TPG Inc. for $44 billion. As of December 2022, it remained the largest leveraged buyout in history.

In 2016, ECP invested in Sunnova Energy Corp.

In August 2017, ECP led an investor consortium that included Access Industries and CPP Investment Board to acquire Calpine and take it private for $5.6 billion. In January 2025, ECP announced the sale of Calpine to Constellation Energy for $26.6 billion, the largest private equity exit in the power and utility sector in two decades. In 2026, the sale was completed thereby forming the largest electricity generator in the U.S.

In 2022, ECP bought the UK waste management firm Biffa for $1.4 billion. The transaction was completed in January 2023 and Biffa was delisted from the London Stock Exchange.

In January 2023, it was reported that ECP was working with Sumitomo Mitsui Trust Bank to establish a Japan decarbonization fund.

In May 2024, ECP finalized the acquisition of Atlantica Sustainable Infrastructure, which owns renewable energy projects worldwide. The $2.56 billion transaction helped Algonquin Power and Utilities reduce debt and revamp its capital structure.

In December 2024, Orsted divested its 50% equity stake in three US projects to ECP.

ECP sold Liberty Tire Recycling, a company they had acquired in 2021, to I Squared Capital for $1.5 billion in October 2025.

In 2025, ECP sold Symmetry Energy Solutions, the gas retail platform with commercial, industrial, and residential customers, to NextEra Energy.

At the beginning of 2026, ECP announced the sale of three power plants totaling 2.6 GW of natural gas generation capacity to Talen Energy.

== Regulatory fines ==
In June 2022, ECP agreed to pay a $1 million fine to the U.S. Securities and Exchange Commission for allegedly requiring some investors to pay more than their share of fund expenses without getting their approval back in 2017. ECP had also repaid investors more than $3.3 million.
