= Dean Buntrock =

American businessman (1931–2026)

Dean L. Buntrock
- Born: Dean Lewis Buntrock; June 6, 1931; Columbia, South Dakota, U.S.
- Died: April 17, 2026 (aged 94); Indian Wells, California, U.S.
- Education: St. Olaf College (1955)
- Spouses: Elizabeth "B.J." Huizenga (m. 1955; div. 1983); Rosemarie Nuzzo (m. 1984)
- Parents: Rudy Buntrock (father); Lillian (Hustad) Buntrock (mother)

Dean Lewis Buntrock (June 6, 1931 – April 17, 2026) was an American businessman and philanthropist most well known for his founding and longtime leadership of Waste Management, Inc., North America's largest waste services company. Buntrock is also well known for his part in the lawsuit in which he and others were charged by the SEC for overstating profits by $1.7 billion.

== Early years ==
Born in Columbia, South Dakota, on June 6, 1931, Buntrock began learning about business working for his father, Rudy Buntrock, a community leader who owned a farm services business that included International Harvester farm equipment, tractors and trucks, along with Standard Oil products, hardware and other farming-related needs. He led campaigns to build the local gym and fund War Bonds. Guided by his father's businesses and by his mother, Lillian (née Hustad), Buntrock showed entrepreneurial traits by raising chickens and growing potatoes. At age 14, he drove a truck hauling grain during harvest and at 16 became a salesman for his father's business.

== Education ==
Buntrock was raised a Lutheran and his early education was based on his parents' Christian values, such as tithing, saving, respect and pursuing excellence. He attended the one-room St. John's Lutheran School from grades five through eight. The school had 30 students; his high school class would have just eight graduates. His education continued at St. Olaf College in Northfield, Minnesota, where he majored in business and history. He returned home in his junior year to help with the family business when his father developed cardiovascular disease. He served in the Korean War, attending finance school at Fort Benjamin Harrison, before returning to St. Olaf to complete his college studies in 1955.

Two days after graduation, Buntrock married Elizabeth (Betty) Joanne "B.J." Huizenga, also a student at St. Olaf.

== Entry into waste services ==
Buntrock set off to Boulder, Colorado, where he briefly became a successful life insurance salesman for the Equitable Life Assurance Society of New York, earning commissions on life-insured home refinancings. Upon the death of his father-in-law, Peter, Buntrock returned to Chicago to care for his mother-in-law's interest in Peter's business, Ace Scavenger Service. He came on as the manager with no stake in the business. Then in early 1957, only four months after his arrival, Larry Groot, a partner who persuaded Buntrock to join the business, also died of a heart attack, leaving Buntrock in charge. According to Timothy Jacobson's history of the company, Waste Management, A Corporate American Success Story, Ace had just 15 collection routes, each with revenues of $4,000 a month, and an interest in a waste incinerator called Incinerator Inc. Buntrock brought home $200 a week.

== Waste Management ==
=== Founding ===
Over the next decade, Buntrock continued to grow the business, doubling its revenues every three years. He expanded to Milwaukee in 1959, acquiring Acme Disposal in a trade for some Chicago collection routes and added Wheeling, Illinois, residential routes the same year. He acquired a landfill in 1967 in Brookfield, Wisconsin. Buntrock soon connected with Wayne Huizenga, his wife's first cousin who operated Southern Sanitation Services, a small but fast-growing garbage hauling business in Broward County, Florida, begun in 1962. In 1967, Buntrock and Huizenga became partners when Buntrock purchased Huizenga's former father-in-law's one-third interest in Southern and assumed responsibility for financing its growth. In 1968, Buntrock incorporated Waste Management Inc. His goal was to organize a single holding company to bring together the disparate operations that he and Wayne Huizenga had cobbled together. At that time, the hauling companies and disposal sites in Chicago, Milwaukee and south Florida had operated as independent privately owned companies. The name, Waste Management, Inc., was Buntrock's idea, according to historian Jacobson. Buntrock had seen a reference to solid waste management equipment in a trade publication and, dropping the word "solid", he thought the name Waste Management captured his vision of the company's services and future. Buntrock knew that Waste Management needed to operate on a larger scale in order to attract future investors. In late 1970, in a series of transactions handled by his brother-in-law, Peter Huizenga (a young lawyer in Chicago), Buntrock's vision was put into action. The new Waste Management Inc. acquired all of the Buntrock managed businesses in Illinois, Wisconsin and Minnesota along with Wayne Huizenga's Florida business. A third founding partner, Larry Beck (Buntrock knew from the Chicago Ash and Scavenger Association) merged his Atlas Disposal businesses which operated on Chicago's south side into Waste Management. At the same time, Waste Management acquired the CID Landfill, a 150-acre disposal facility on the Chicago/Calumet City border which Buntrock had developed and opened in 1967. This would become a major company asset for many years to come. On January 1, 1971, these three founding partners, Buntrock, Huizenga and Beck, officially began business together under the new Waste Management brand.

=== Initial public offering ===
Buntrock and his partners had been supporting their companies' early growth with borrowings from community banks in Berwyn, Cicero and Oak Park, Illinois. They were paying for equipment on time, sending in payments with loan book remittance slips. But Buntrock envisioned that their operations would one day go public. He was not the first to do so. Browning-Ferris Industries (BFI) had gone public in 1969 and pioneered the industry's arriving consolidation, providing a path for Buntrock to follow. Buntrock brought in expert financial help to better organize the company. He had dealt with a number of banks and secured a $6 million credit line from the Continental Illinois National Bank and Trust Company of Illinois, but a public offering was needed to provide the capital and support the growth they foresaw coming. Waste Management, with The Chicago Corporation as its lead underwriter, went public on June 17, 1971, approximately 19 months after the creation of the United States Environmental Protection Agency on December 2, 1970. The offering was for 320,000 shares at $16 per share, raising approximately $4 million. At the end of 1971, Waste Management revenues were nearly $17 million and earnings $1.3 million. A second offering a year later raised an additional $25 million in equity capital. Its IPO prospectus noted that Waste Management served 8,000 commercial and industrial customers in Illinois, Indiana, Wisconsin and Florida and over 30,000 residential customers in Illinois, Indiana and Wisconsin. It operated 29 landfills in Florida, Illinois, Minnesota and Wisconsin. It had approximately 400 employees.

=== Expansion ===
Over the next 25 years, Buntrock and his team led Waste Management's expansion across North America. The company's capabilities gradually grew to include the full range of recycling and solid waste services, hazardous wastes management services, waste-to-energy capability, clean water technologies, and environmental engineering. For a time, it expanded internationally, introducing municipal cleaning services in Saudi Arabia, and serving customers in more than 20 countries in Europe, South America, Asia, Australia and New Zealand. Buntrock retired as CEO at age 65 in 1996 at which time the company had grown to more than $9 billion in annual revenues.

=== Colleagues ===
A group of executives who launched successful careers as part of the Buntrock team at Waste Management went on to capture additional achievements once their Waste Management days were over. Wayne Huizenga, Larry Beck (and his son Scott Beck), and retired Waste Management Chief Financial Officer Don Flynn and other former executives and associates invested in and led the development of the Blockbuster Video chain. Members of this group further developed such well-known corporate names as Boston Chicken (now Boston Market), Discovery Zone, H2O Plus, AutoNation, Extended Stay America and LKQ. All received Buntrock's support and, in most cases, his investment.

== Industry founder ==
Buntrock and other Chicago haulers understood the value of having a local trade organization. First called the Chicago and Suburban Ash and Scavenger Association, the group evolved to become the Chicago and Suburban Refuse Disposal Association. It gave the haulers an industry voice and means to communicate with local governments from which they sought collection contracts. Buntrock further recognized the need for a national association. He emerged as the leader of the National Council of Refuse Disposal Trade Associations, founded in 1962. Buntrock, Harold Vandermolen, another Chicagoan, and Marshall Rabins from California each contributed $5,000 to engage a lawyer to incorporate the small group. Buntrock was its first president. His plan brought together entrepreneurs in waste management into an association that had size, experience and the know-how to play a role in developing new waste practices and introducing new waste management technologies. The association focused on recruiting new members and began monitoring developments in labor law, public health and trade practices. As it began to reach out to federal government agencies, its leaders recognized they needed a more formally organized national voice. Buntrock hired a small Washington public relations firm, Larry Hogan Associates, to manage the group. Harold Gershowitz, a partner in the firm, became the association's first executive director. In 1968, the association was renamed the National Solid Wastes Management Association. Founder Buntrock served as its president through the mid-1960s and remained a director for nearly 20 years.

== Philanthropy ==
Buntrock has been a generous benefactor for numerous institutions, including his alma mater St. Olaf College, the Lutheran Church in America, the Chicago Symphony Orchestra, numerous arts organizations, and to conservation and environmental groups such as Ducks Unlimited and the National Wildlife Federation, the last of which he served as a director. In 1996 he contributed $26 million to St. Olaf College, the largest single gift donated to the school or any other Lutheran college in the United States. The money was the lead gift to build a new student center which opened on November 5, 1999. Named the Buntrock Commons in honor of Buntrock and his family, the building is a community center housing services to support student academic and social lives. Buntrock served as chair of the St. Olaf Board of Regents from 1986 to 1995. In 2018 Buntrock contributed $21.4 million to Luther Seminary in St. Paul, Minnesota, the largest single gift in its history. The gift funded a pilot program designed to allow the seminary to educate and train students in two years, instead of the four years typically needed for a master's degree in divinity. The gift was to reduce the cost to students and lower college debt, which has been a detriment to seminary school enrollment. Buntrock philanthropy has supported numerous Chicago civic and cultural institutions. A life trustee of the Chicago Symphony Orchestra, Buntrock funded the development of the CSO's Symphony Center, a multi-use facility used for rehearsals by the Chicago Symphony Chorus and Civic Orchestra of Chicago. The facility is used for chamber performances, dinners, receptions, lectures, trade shows and meetings. He was a founding board member and contributor to Chicago's Millennium Park. He served as a member of the Terra Foundation for American Art board and played a key role in filing a lawsuit with other board members that resulted in keeping the Terra Museum in Chicago. Buntrock has supported a range of health institutions, including Chicago's Rush University Medical Center, the Lurie Children's Hospital and the Eisenhower Medical Center in Rancho Mirage, California.

== SEC Settlement on earnings management fraud ==
In August 2005, The United States Securities and Exchange Commission announced that it had reached a settlement with Buntrock and three other former Waste Management executives to resolve a civil complaint issued in 2002. The complaint alleged fraudulent accounting that resulted in overstatement of the company's profits, beginning in 1992 and continuing into 1997. He, among other defendants, was alleged to have engaged in a systematic scheme to falsify and misrepresent Waste Management's financial results, overstating profits by $1.7 billion. The SEC alleged that Buntrock and the executives were responsible for the loss in over $6 billion in shareholder value. Buntrock and the former executives admitted to no wrongdoing but agreed to a range of financial and other penalties to resolve the matter.

== Personal life and death ==
Buntrock had three daughters from his marriage to B.J. Huizenga and six granddaughters. The marriage to Huizenga, who died in 2014, ended in divorce in 1983. In 1984, Buntrock married Rosemarie Nuzzo.

Buntrock died at his home in Indian Wells, California, on April 17, 2026, at the age of 94.

== Awards ==
Buntrock received the Horatio Alger Award in 1996. The award recognizes "contemporary role models whose experiences exemplify that opportunities for a successful life are available to all individuals who are dedicated to the principles of integrity, hard work, perseverance and compassion for others". In 1992, he was inducted into the Sales & Marketing Executives International Academy of Achievement, established to recognize personal and corporate success in sales and marketing. In 1997, he was named outstanding chief executive in the pollution control industry by Financial World and The Wall Street Transcript. He was inducted into the National Solid Wastes Management Association Hall of Fame in 2007.
