= SS Corduff =

History
- Name: Corduff
- Owner: William Cory & Son Ltd, London
- Builder: Swan, Hunter & Wigham Richardson Ltd, Wallsend
- Yard number: 1221
- Launched: 6 November 1923
- Completed: December 1923
- Fate: Sunk on 7 March 1941

General characteristics
- Tonnage: 2,345 gross register tons (GRT); 1,322 net register tons (NRT)
- Length: 284.5 ft (86.7 m)
- Beam: 42 ft (13 m)
- Depth: 19.6 ft (6.0 m)
- Installed power: 247 nhp
- Propulsion: Triple expansion steam engine

SS Corduff, a laden 2,345 GRT collier in East Coast convoy FS 32, was damaged, though without casualties, in an attack by Stuka divebomber aircraft in the Barrow Deep on 11 November 1940.

On the night of 7/8 March 1941 she was torpedoed and sunk by German E-boat S28 while heading north with a convoy off Cromer. Seven of her crew were lost, and, after drifting for some hours and being hailed by the E-boat captain, the other 14 (including Captain Rees) were found by the Cromer lifeboat H F Bailey. It was the night of the most successful E-boat raid on East Coast merchant shipping, with six other ships sunk. Corduff belonged to William Cory & Son Ltd.
