= Envirogreen Recycling =

Irish-based environmental services company

Envirogreen
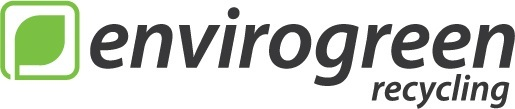
- Industry: Waste management Recycling
- Founded: May 2012
- Headquarters: Dublin, Ireland
- Products: Recycling Services, waste management
- Revenue: €17 million(2022)
- Number of employees: 110 (2022)
- Website: EnvirogreenRecycling.com

Envirogreen is an Irish-based environmental services company which operates solely in the waste management industry. The company provides transformative and innovative commercial recycling solutions by encouraging private companies to sort segregate their materials and sell them as recyclables rather than landfill them.

== Activities ==
Envirogreen operates within the commercial recycling sector in the UK, Ireland. The company provides bespoke commercial recycling services in Ireland and the UK. Envirogreen has an 89% Recovery rate which is well above the national Irish average of 39.5%

=== Recycling ===
Envirogreen's activities include:

- The recycling and recovery of Plastic, Cardboard, Paper,
- The brokerage of recyclables in the UK, Ireland
- Design and implementation Environmental Management Systems
- Polystyrene Recycling Services throughout Ireland
- Waste Consultancy

=== Waste Management ===
- Sorts and processes commercial recyclables, and contaminated agricultural waste

== Carbon Reduction Reporting ==
Envirogreen is the first waste management company in Ireland to introduce Carbon reduction reporting which allows its clients to see how much CO_{2} it has saved and the equivalent number of cars taken off the road by choosing recycling rather than landfill.

== See also ==
- Recycling Services in Ireland
