= Service Corporation of America =

Service Corporation of America (later known as SCA Services, Incorporated) was a Boston-based waste and environmental services company in North America. The company was later a subsidiary of Waste Management, Inc., active from 1970-1984.

== History ==
=== Early years ===
SCA was unique in that it was not originally supposed to be a waste hauler. SCA was incorporated by Berton Steir as a diversified conglomerate, providing building maintenance, vending, food, travel, and waste disposal service. SCA's first acquisition was of seven vending companies, a building maintenance company, and a single waste hauler. By the time its stock was placed on the NYSE, it had decided to focus on waste disposal instead. Similar to many of the other firms around this time, it would purchase companies with its stock. In the early 1970s, SCA absorbed 87 independent contractors. As part of the deals, SCA would keep the current management in control. The Harvard-educated Steir naïvely acquired New Jersey trash companies, with disguised ownership, which subsequently caused SCA problems. Berton Steir left the company in 1976.

=== Mafia and Criminal Connections Emerge ===
SCA was the first major trash hauler to enter New Jersey, which proved to be highly unstable for the company. To combat this, Tom Viola and his firm were enlisted to soften up the market. Viola also brought his criminal connections with him, but despite this, he was made SCA's vice president. Another waste hauler, based out of Utica, New York, was owned by the infamous Anthony Bentro, known for his connections to Anthony Provenzano, a mobster linked with plots to murder Fidel Castro, John F. Kennedy and Jimmy Hoffa. Months after Hoffa's assassination, prominent members of SCA's New York team were indicted for planning a $300,000 kickback to mobsters and Teamsters.

=== Continued Expansion ===
SCA had grown to become the third largest waste hauler amidst all this internal turmoil. Its territory stretched from Boston, Massachusetts, all the way to California. By 1976, the company's sales were $660,000,000, including all of its subsidiaries. SCA's fleet of garbage trucks had swelled to 1,800 in 90 cities. It had 39 landfills, 100 municipal contracts, 110,000 commercial accounts and 100,000 dumpsters. SCA's data center in Somerville, MA provided information technology ("IT") services to its haulers, many of which had no IT capability prior to acquisition by SCA in the 1980s.

=== Hazardous Waste Activities ===
SCA had begun to diversify into the world of hazardous wastes. It owned sites in five states. One of these dumps in Niagara Falls, New York, near the infamous Love Canal site, became a local terror. Lagoons of industrial waste would emerge during rainstorms, and highway officials reported of numerous explosions and fires. A 1976 incident was described as sending flames and exploding drums 80 feet in the air. Continued public protest made SCA prefer incineration of toxic wastes to landfill burial. These efforts appeared to pay off when President Carter banned hazardous waste burial, but the Reagan administration quickly reversed these policies.

=== The Fall Of SCA ===
The company's criminal connections would become known after the murder of several independent contractors who had challenged SCA in New Jersey. Immediately afterwards, the towns reverted to SCA's services. In response to these accusations, SCA tried to dispose of all of its New Jersey operations, but couldn't find a buyer. Due to the numerous troubles that Tom Viola had gotten the company into, he resigned in 1981. Viola was replaced by a far more reputable business leader, Henry Russell. In one of the strangest alliances in the company's history, SCA joined the Environmental Defense Fund to reinstate the ban of hazardous waste dumping. But these moves just forestalled SCA's inevitable demise.

=== BFI Vs. Waste Management ===
Houston based Browning-Ferris Industries attempted to swallow the company whole in 1982. Many inside the company questioned if this would work. SCA had rejected an offer by Waste Management in 1977, and this was no different. What would have amounted to an $210 million deal, was rejected by the company. Canadian waste hauler Laidlaw was going to purchase SCA, but the various scandals and criminal connections that the company had deterred the company from pursuing mergers. Through a subsidiary, 60 percent of SCA was purchased by Waste Management, Inc.

== Sources ==
- "Giants Of Garbage" By Harold Crooks, 1988.
- https://www.nytimes.com/1982/01/23/business/sca-services-inc-reports-earnings-for-qtr-to-dec-31.html
- https://www.nytimes.com/1984/06/23/business/sca-studying-merger-proposals.html
