= Waste Management, Inc. =

American waste and environmental services company

- Trade name: WM
- Formerly: USA Waste Services, Inc.
- Type: Public
- Traded as: NYSE: WM; S&P 500 component
- Industry: Waste management
- Founded: January 1, 1968; 58 years ago in Chicago, Illinois, U.S.
- Founders: Wayne Huizenga; Dean Buntrock
- Headquarters: Houston, Texas, U.S.
- Area served: North America
- Key people: James C. Fish, Jr. (president & CEO)
- Products: Bagster
- Services: Waste, recyclables, yard debris / organics, and hazardous materials collection, hauling, treatment and disposal Dumpster rental Portable toilet rental Sustainability Advisory Services
- Revenue: ▲US$20.426 billion (Fiscal Year Ended December 31, 2023)
- Operating income: ▲US$3.575 billion (Fiscal Year Ended December 31, 2023)
- Net income: ▲US$2.304 billion (Fiscal Year Ended December 31, 2023)
- Total assets: ▲US$32.823 billion (Fiscal Year Ended December 31, 2023)
- Total equity: ▲US$6.903 billion (Fiscal Year Ended December 31, 2023)
- Number of employees: ~48,000 (December 2023)
- Website: wm.com

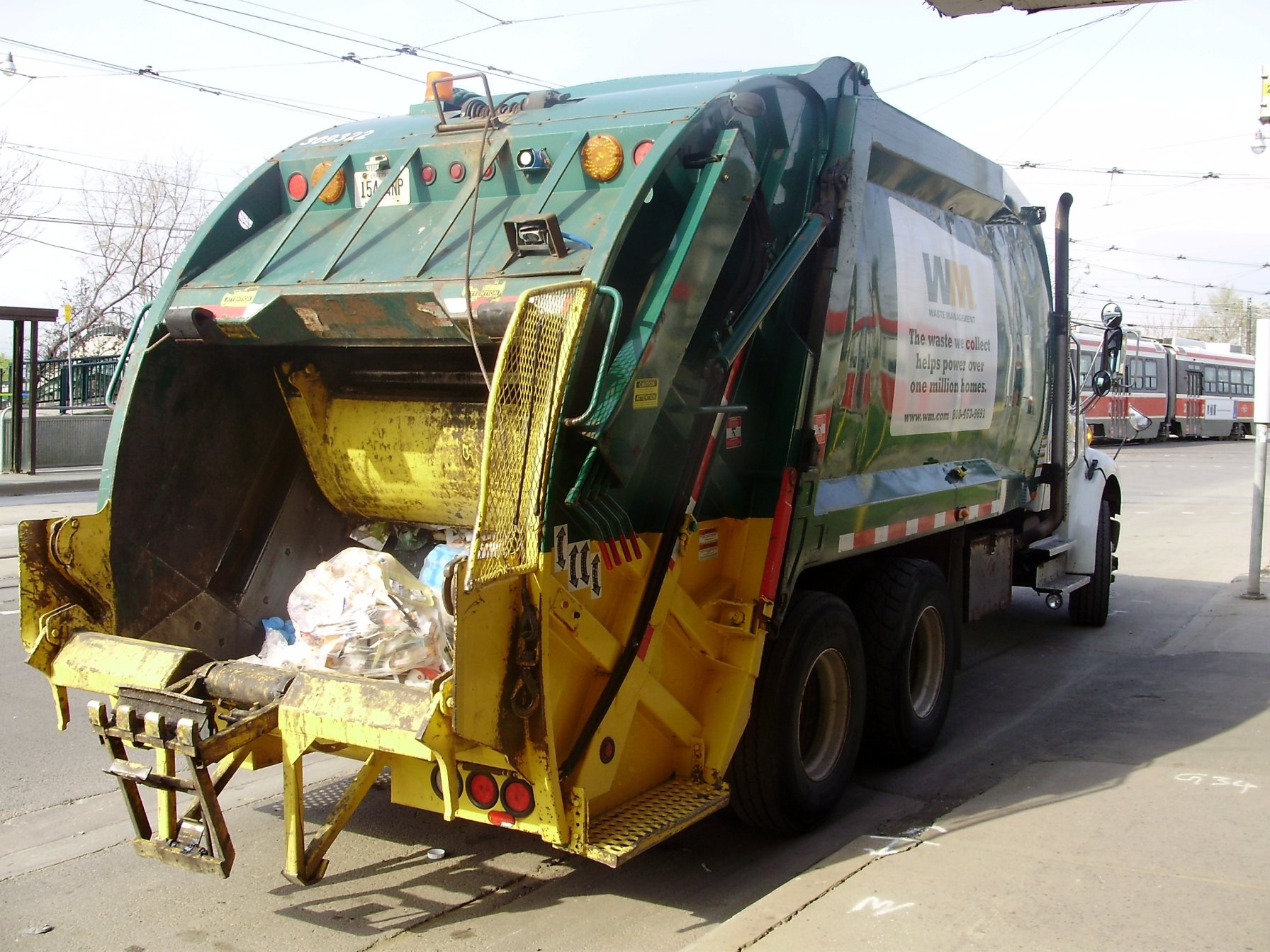
A WM trash collection truck in Toronto, Ontario.

Video clip of WM trash removal operation, Ypsilanti Twp., MI

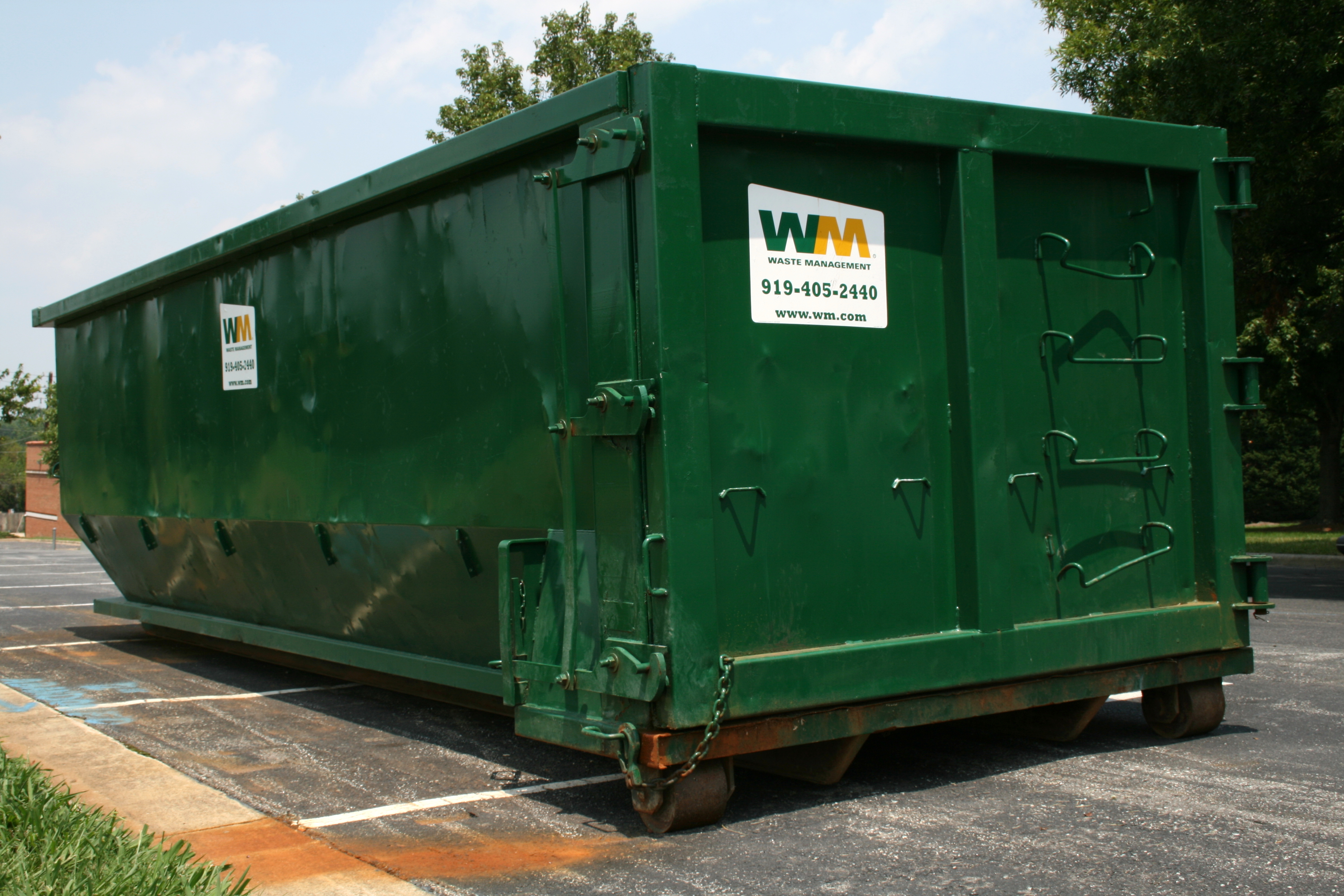
A WM rolloff container in Durham, North Carolina.

Waste Management, Inc., doing business as WM, is an American waste management company operating in North America. Founded in 1968, the company is headquartered in the Bank of America Tower in Houston, Texas.

The company's network includes 337 transfer stations, 254 active landfills, 97 recycling plants, 135 landfill gas utilization projects, and six power plants. WM serves approximately 21 million residential, industrial, municipal, and commercial customers across the United States, Canada, and Puerto Rico. The company operates the industry's largest trucking fleet, with 26,000 collection and transfer vehicles. WM and its largest competitor, Republic Services, Inc., manage more than half of the garbage collection in the United States.

== History ==
In 1893, Dutch immigrant Harm Huizenga began a garbage hauling business in Chicago, charging $1.25 per wagon. In 1968, his grandson Wayne Huizenga, along with Dean Buntrock and Larry Beck, founded Waste Management, Inc. and expanded by acquiring many of the smaller garbage collection services across the country. The company went public in 1971 and reached $82 million in revenue by 1972. At that time, it served 60,000 commercial and industrial accounts and 600,000 residential customers across 19 states and two Canadian provinces. In the 1980s, Waste Management became the largest waste hauler in the United States after acquiring Service Corporation of America (SCA).

From 1992 to 1997, executive officers at Waste Management, Inc. engaged in widespread accounting manipulation to artificially inflate the company's financial performance. This systematic effort involved mismanaged expense reports, such as refusing to write off costs from failed projects and improperly capitalizing various operating costs. The executives further distorted the balance sheet by establishing inflated environmental reserves during acquisitions to offset unrelated expenses, failing to set aside sufficient funds for income taxes, and manipulating depreciation schedules for equipment like garbage trucks. Additional tactics included assigning arbitrary salvage values to assets and utilizing "netting" and "geography" entries to obscure hundreds of millions of dollars in expenses behind unrelated gains or different income statement line items. Although leadership was accused of forcing the financial statements to meet desired targets, the top officers eventually settled with the federal government for $30.8 million in 2005 without admitting to any wrongdoing.

When a new CEO took charge of the company in 1997, he ordered a review of the company's accounting practices. In 1998 Waste Management restated its 1992–1997 earnings by $1.7 billion, making it the largest restatement in history.

In 1998, Waste Management merged with USA Waste Services, Inc. USA Waste Services CEO John E. Drury retained the chairmanship and CEO position of the combined company. Waste Management then relocated its headquarters from Chicago to Houston. The merged company retained the Waste Management brand. In late 1999, John Drury stepped down as chairman due to brain surgery. Rodney R. Proto then took the position of chairman and CEO. That year also brought trouble for the newly expanded company in the form of an accounting scandal.

In November 1999, a new CEO was appointed to oversee the company's recovery. The company has since implemented new technologies, safety standards, and operational practices.

On July 14, 2008, Waste Management made a $34 per share all-cash bid to acquire Republic Services, Inc., later raising it to $37 per share. Republic Services rejected both bids. On October 13, 2008, Waste Management withdrew the offer, citing financial market turmoil.

In 2015, Winters Brothers assumed all of WM's operations in Connecticut and New York (excluding New York City) and continues to service these regions under contract with the company.

In February 2022, CEO Jim Fish announced the company would shorten its trade name to "WM". This rebranding was intended to reflect a shift toward sustainability and environmental services, such as compressed natural gas and landfill gas utilization.

In May 2024, WM announced a $7.2 billion deal to acquire Stericycle, an Illinois-based medical waste and paper shredding company. The acquisition was completed in November 2024.

== Recycling ==
As of 2023, WM operated 97 recycling facilities. WM has also participated in recycling-focused initiatives with other companies:

- LG Electronics for electronic waste recycling
- Live Nation Entertainment for recycling at sports and music venues
- PepsiCo for beverage container recycling
- Valero Energy for waste-to-fuel conversion technology
- Enerkem for converting waste to ethanol

== International ==
In 2009, Waste Management purchased a 40-percent stake in Shanghai Environment Group Co. Ltd. (SEG), a wholly owned subsidiary of Shanghai Chengtou Holding Co. Ltd. SEG sought the investment in order to benefit from Waste Management's experience in the waste disposal field, as well as improve their technology for waste disposal.

== Corporate issues ==
=== 1995 lawsuit ===
Shareholders sued Wheelabrator Technologies's (WTI) board of directors for breach of their fiduciary duty, challenging the merger of WTI into Waste Management. In 1995, the case, In re Wheelabrator Technologies, Inc. Shareholders Litigation, came before the Court of Chancery of Delaware on an appeal regarding the Board's motion for summary judgment. The shareholders argued the Board breached their duty of care because there was not sufficient process, they didn't look at alternative transactions, didn't consider information regarding waste's legal liabilities, they didn't appoint a committee of independent directors to negotiate the merger, and they didn't adequately consider the terms of the merger; they breached their duty of loyalty, and; they breached their duty to disclose relevant information regarding the merger. Ultimately, the court dismissed the duty of disclosure claim but allowed the duty of loyalty claim to a degree. In regards to the duty of loyalty claim, the court disagreed with both the shareholders and the Board. It labelled the merger as an interested transaction, not a controlled shareholder transaction, so the business judgment rule applies and the burden to prove waste is on the shareholders.

=== Accounting improprieties ===
Revelations of irregular accounting led to a major drop in stock price and to the replacement of top executives after a new CEO ordered a review of the company's accounting practices in 1998. Waste Management's shareholders lost more than $6 billion in the market value of their investments when the stock price plummeted by more than 33%. The company had augmented the depreciation time length for their property, plant, and equipment, artificially inflating the company's after-tax profits by US$1.7 billion. On July 8, 1999, a class action lawsuit was filed against WMI and certain officers for issuing false statements. Waste Management paid US$457 million to settle a shareholder class-action suit in 2003. The SEC fined Waste Management's independent auditor, Arthur Andersen, US$7 million for its role.

=== ERP software implementation failure ===
In 2005, Waste Management entered into a software licensing agreement (SLA) with SAP AG. Under the agreement, SAP and its wholly owned subsidiary, Tomorrow Now, were to implement SAP's enterprise resource planning software. The implementation began when an eight-month pilot program was established in Waste Management's New Mexico market area, the market-share area at the time. This initial implementation was to be followed in two months with a company-wide implementation from Waste Management's headquarters in Houston, Texas.

In December 2007, Waste Management ended their ERP implementation effort. Waste Management characterized the ERP implementation as non-functional. An SAP sponsored "Solution Review" determined that a customized ERP, based upon an updated SAP ERP, would need to be made in order to accommodate a company-wide implementation.

Waste Management sued SAP for the US$100 million to recover the funds it had spent on the failed ERP implementation. In the lawsuit, Waste Management accused SAP of fraud and deception. SAP countered that Waste Management failed to present knowledgeable workers and accurate business models and failed to migrate data from legacy systems. The suit concluded in 2010 under confidential terms and a one-time payment from SAP to Waste Management disclosed to the SEC.

== Labor relations ==
In 2007, Waste Management locked out Teamsters at its largest hauling operation in Alameda County, CA. The lockout lasted a little less than a month and put 900 members of the Teamsters, ILWU, and Machinists Union on picket lines and raised concerns over sanitary impact on the affected communities. The lockout was stopped when affected communities started legal actions against Waste Management. According to Waste Management officials, the company worked over three months to negotiate an agreement fair to both Waste Management and the union. The union did not want to negotiate over the company's proposals and refused to offer their own proposal unless Waste Management agreed to withdraw all proposals from the table. Oakland's City Council reached a settlement with Waste Management over the dispute in March, 2008. The company rebated more than $3 million to customers and Oakland customers received additional services over the next five years.

== Environmental policy and record ==
In 1990, the board of Waste Management adopted an environmental policy, including a policy of no-net-loss of biodiversity on the company's properties. Waste Management also took positions around that time supporting legislation on hazardous waste reduction (1988), waste export control (1989), and protection of endangered species (1992).

Waste Management's operations consist of environmental protection, groundwater protection, environmental engineering, and air and gas management. Waste Management currently operates ten full-scale waste treatment landfill projects in the U.S. and Canada. As a member of the Chicago Climate Exchange (CCX), Waste Management made a commitment during the pilot phase to reduce its greenhouse gas emissions by four percent below the average of its 1998–2001 baseline by 2006. They have also replaced nearly 500 diesel-fueled trucks with vehicles that run on 100 percent natural gas. These new garbage and recycling trucks comprise one of the nation's largest fleets of heavy-duty trucks powered exclusively by natural gas.

In November 2009, at Waste Management's Altamont Landfill, a new plant began producing 13,000 gallons a day of LNG fuel from methane gas from the landfill that had fueled an electric power plant since 1969. Waste Management has said that the plant, announced in April 2008, and built and operated by The Linde Group with state funding, is the world's largest facility to convert landfill gas into vehicle fuel.

Waste Management works with environmental groups in the U.S. to set aside land to create and manage wetlands and wildlife habitats. The company's landfills currently provide approximately 21,000 acres (85 km^{2}) of protected land for wildlife; 73 landfills are certified by the Wildlife Habitat Council.

In May 2011, Waste Management's Wheelabrator division agreed to pay a record $7.5 million settlement with the Commonwealth of Massachusetts for a host of environmental violations at its plants in North Andover, Saugus, and Millbury, Massachusetts. The settlement was announced on May 2, 2011, by the Massachusetts Department of Environmental Protection and Attorney General Martha Coakley's office.

== Financial restatements ==
On November 14, 1997, the company reclassified or adjusted certain items in its financial statements for 1996 and the first nine months of 1997.

On August 3, 1999, the company would have to restate first-quarter results downward, partly because of changes in the value of landfills and other assets in connection with its acquisition last year of Wheelabrator Technologies Inc.

== See also ==
- List of waste management companies
