= Lystek =

Lystek International, Inc.
- Company type: Privately held company
- Industry: Thermal hydrolysis Waste management
- Founded: 2000 in Ontario, Canada
- Founders: Owen Ward; Ajay Singh
- Headquarters: Ontario, Canada
- Area served: North America
- Key people: Ajay Singh (Technical Director); Michael Beswick (Executive Vice President)
- Products: LysteGro; LysteMize; LysteCarb
- Parent: R. W. Tomlinson Ltd.
- Website: lystek.com

Lystek International is a Canadian waste treatment technology company founded in 2000 at the University of Waterloo, Ontario, Canada to commercialize treatment technologies for biosolids and other non-hazardous, organic waste materials. Lystek is headquartered in Cambridge, Ontario, Canada and is owned by its management and R.W. Tomlinson Ltd.

== Technology ==
Lystek's technology uses thermal hydrolysis involving high speed shearing, alkali addition and low temperature steam to produce biofertilizer. The product can be sold as a commercial biofertilizer called LysteGro or recycled to anaerobic digesters and biological nutrient removal (BNR) systems for optimization of the wastewater treatment plant operation. The Lystek process condition disintegrates microbial cell wall/membranes and hydrolyzes complex macromolecules into simpler compounds. Recycling up to 25% of the product to the digester increases biogas yields by greater than 30 % and enhances biodegradation, reducing output of biosolids by at least 20%.

== Applications ==
The Lystek system can be installed as a back end, post Anaerobic digestion, post dewatering solution at the wastewater treatment plant. It can also take raw sludge directly without an anaerobic digester process. Alternatively, the system can be used in a regional processing hub to service multiple organic waste generators. The Lystek solution is modular and has a small footprint, making it flexible to deploy and easy to retrofit into existing facilities.

== Commercial plants and projects ==
As of 2015, there are five installations of the Lystek technology in Ontario, and a sixth facility in North Battleford, Saskatchewan. A seventh installation, (first in the U.S.) was planned to be commissioned and fully operational in Fairfield, California by the end of the first calendar quarter of 2016.
