= Biogen UK =

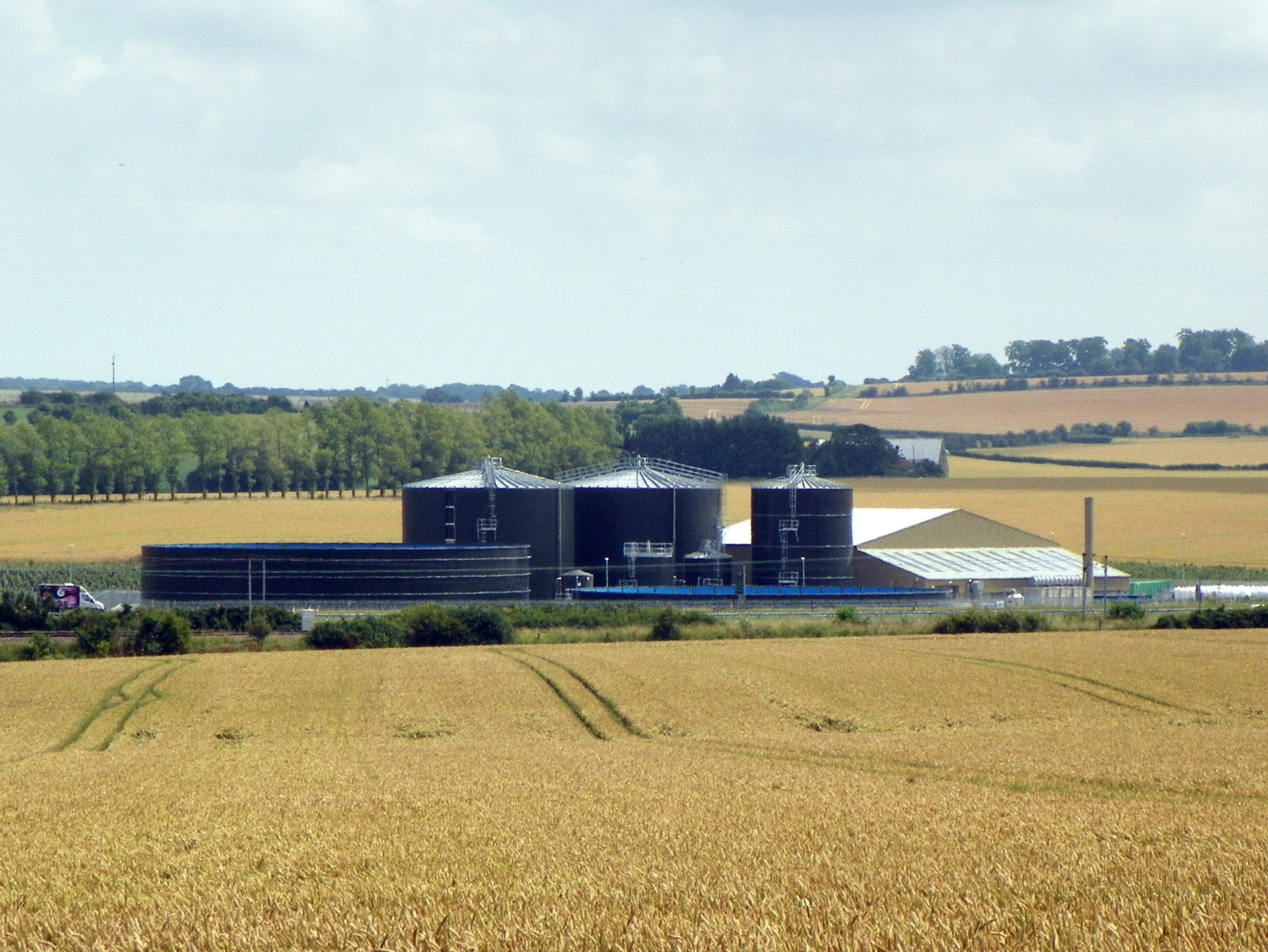
Plant in Bygrave, Hertfordshire

Biogen (UK) Ltd is a British company which operates anaerobic digestion plants. It is responsible for the construction of 22 plants to date and currently operates Nineteen anaerobic digestion plants (12 Food Waste and 7 Agricultural Plants) in England, Scotland and Wales. It is based in Milton Ernest, Bedfordshire.

== History ==
Biogen's anaerobic digestion business was established in 2005 with investment from Bedfordia Group. The company's Twinwoods anaerobic digestion (AD) plant, at Milton Ernest in Bedfordshire was completed in 2006 to recycle food waste along with animal slurry from Bedfordia Farms. In 2008 Biogen acquired technology and engineering company Greenfinch Ltd. Greenfinch was set up in 1993, initially constructing AD plants for the waste water industry and for farmers as a form of managing their livestock waste. In 2012 Biogen secured £24m of investment from construction, property and services company Kier Group, making them joint venture partners alongside Bedfordia Group.

Since 2006 Biogen's main focus has been on providing a sustainable food waste treatment service for local authorities, retailers, pubs, restaurants, hotels, offices and food manufacturers. The company employs over 150 people across the UK and has its head office in Milton Ernest, Bedfordshire. In April 2017 the company was bought for an undisclosed sum by Ancala Bioenergy Ltd, an infrastructure investment vehicle managed by Ancala Partners LLP, to provide an established platform for Ancala to expand into the waste-to-energy sector.

== Operations ==
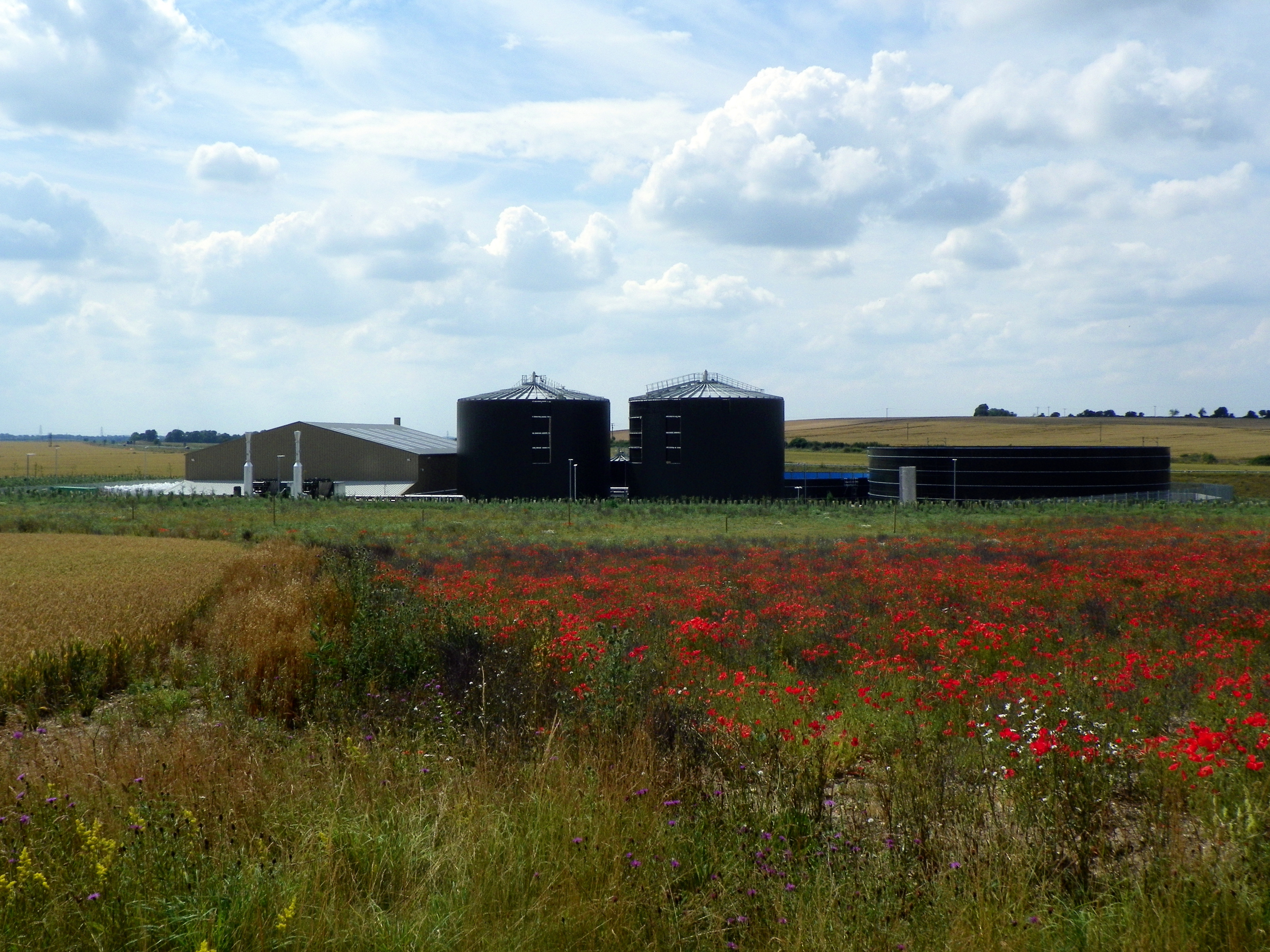
Plant viewed from outside

Biogen's AD plants recycle over half a million tonnes of organic waste each year and can generate 36MW of green electricity for the national grid every hour of every day The anaerobic digestion process also produces is a liquid rich in nitrogen, potash, phosphate and other trace elements that can be stored on site until spreading time and returned to the land as a nutrient rich biofertiliser to grow more crops, completing a closed loop system.

== Anaerobic digestion plants ==
Biogen's plants are located in:

1. Basingstoke, Hampshire

2. Bryn Pica, Aberdare

3. Bygrave, Baldock

4. Fairfields Farm, Essex

5. GwyriAD, Caernarfon

6. Halstead, Essex

7. Hoddesdon, Hertfordshire

8. Holbeach, Lincolnshire

9. Manor Farm, Towcester

10. Merevale, Atherstone

11. Millerhill, Dalkeith

12. Retford, Nottinghamshire

13. Stragglethorpe, Nottinghamshire

14. Tornagrain, Inverness

15. Twinwoods, Bedford

16. Waen, St Asaph

17. Wester Kerrowgair, Inverness

18. Weston-super-Mare, Somerset

19. Westwood, Rushden
