= MBA Polymers =

American recycling company

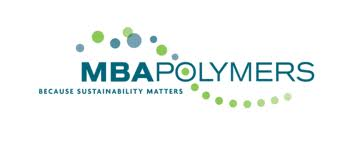
- Founded: 1994; 32 years ago in the United States
- Founder: Trip Allen and Michael Biddle
- Headquarters: Hackensack, New Jersey, USA
- Services: Recycling
- Website: www.mbapolymers.com

MBA Polymers is a recycling company with operations globally that recovers plastics from waste electrical and electronic equipment (WEEE) and auto-shredder residue from end-of-life automobiles (ELV).

== Company history ==
MBA Polymers was founded in 1994 in California by Laurence "Trip" Allen III and Mike Biddle. Allen and Biddle were coworkers at Dow Chemical in Walnut Creek, CA where Allen developed a novel approach to recycling packaging plastics. The pair left Dow in 1992 and initially wanted to prove that it was possible to recycle plastics from complex packaging waste streams but they ultimately focused on durable goods recovery. The company now specializes in recycling durable goods from waste streams such as waste electrical and electronic equipment and auto-shredder residue. MBA Polymers raised money to develop its technology for extracting and recycling plastic from many stakeholders. In 2017 Elephant Equity, a private equity investor based in Munich with focus on cleantech activities, has taken over 100% of the shares.

== Development of the recycling process ==
The key innovation of the MBA Polymers approach was that a mixed waste plastic stream could be sorted into usable pure plastic varieties. Recovery of durable plastic products in earlier processes required that each type of plastic part be identified and sorted by hand into separate batches. The sorted parts were ground and could then be pelletized for reuse but it was costly and difficult to acquire enough of any given type of plastic to justify the expense. Once a mixture of durable goods such as refrigerators are ground into chips, the metal may be removed by magnets and other magnetic-based separators such as eddy-current sorters. This leaves a mixture of perhaps dozens of different polymers. The American Plastics Council guided by Director of Technology, Dr. Michael Fisher funded MBA Polymers Advanced Technology Plastic Recycling Pilot Line In 1994 to exploit a novel approach to density sorting with hydrocyclones among other processes. In the mid-1990s the key challenge to durable plastic recycling was separation of impact resistant polystyrene, often called HIPS for High Impact Polystyrene from Acrylonitrile Butadiene Styrene (ABS). These two plastics types were commonly used and have overlapping densities that make density sortation alone insufficient. The two plastics are incompatible and so a mixture of the two is not generally valuable. A kitchen experiment Allen performed in 1994 revealed a mechanism for separating a mixture of HIPS and ABS that relied on the fact that ABS absorbs more water than HIPS. When heated slightly a mixture of the two plastic will soften and the ABS will swell which reduces its apparent density. The mixture can then be sorted by a simple sink/float separation in water. This discovery lead to an important patent and an Advanced Technology Program Grant award from the National Institute of Standards and Technology worth $687,000 to help MBA develop the process. The technique remains the only reliable process to separate two different varieties of the same plastic such a two commercial grades of ABS with different melt flow properties. The separation process used by MBA Polymers eventually matured to include a sophisticated collection of integrated processes which was robust and very reliable. Based on the promise of this process equity investment was raised to spread the technology to Europe and Asia.

WEEE and ELV arrives at MBA Polymers’ recycling facilities shredded, often from other recyclers that do not handle plastic. With complex in-house developed patented processes the input material is separated and processed to high-quality plastics. Compared to the production of virgin plastics, one metric ton of plastic generated by the process invented by MBA Polymers saves 4.8 metric tons of CO_{2}. MBA works with manufacturers around the world to replace virgin plastics with MBA plastics in their new products. Customers of the company are inter alia AEG, Ford, HP and Canon.

== Global operations ==
Having opened its first pilot-recycling facility in 1994, MBA Polymers also has built recycling plants in the UK, China, Austria and Germany

In 2004 MBA Polymers created a joint venture with Guangzhou Iron and Steel Enterprises Holdings Ltd to establish its sustainable recycling operations in China. MBA Polymers' operations in China now employ over 160 people. The company has invested $15 million in the recycling plant.

The company expanded its operations to Austria in 2006 with a joint venture with the Müller-Guttenbrunn Group (MGG). The plant in Austria has a recycling capacity of over 50,000 metric tons per year.

In 2010 the company expanded to Worksop, United Kingdom, in a joint venture with the largest metal recycler in the British Isles and one of the largest in the world (EMR). The plant produces post-consumer plastics from automotive shredder residue, appliances and electronics and has a processing capacity of over 40,000 metric tons per annum.

MBA has more than 150,00 metric tons per year of processing capacity in Europe, China and the U.S. to turn waste into recycled plastics.

With its new facility in Germany, in Mauna near Meissen, the company wants to make use of the growing quantities of WEEE in Germany and Europe and the global demand for post-consumer plastics. The site has a capacity of 20,000 metric tons per year and employees 20 people.

Furthermore, MBA Polymers has administration offices in Hong Kong, USA, Germany and India.

The company has developed over 40 patents. MBA Polymers’ technology and patents are registered in Australia, Canada, China, Europe and USA. The patents are 100% owned by MBA Polymers Inc, including any improvements made at the plant level. The highly automated polymer separation technology developed and patented by MBA Polymers encompasses over 20 separation procedures to facilitate the recovery, purification, and monetization of commercial plastics by type and grade.

The latest patent was issued on 17.01.2019 by the European Patent office is Nr EP14707916.4: Process and Requirement for the recovery of plastic from durable goods (ASR, ESR, WSR).

== Awards ==
- 2017: ‘Young Global Leaders Award for Circular Economy SME’ of the World Economic Forum (WEF)
- 2014: Katerva Award
- 2012 Gothenburg Award for Sustainable Development
- 2010 Economist Innovation Award
- 2007: World Economic Forum Tech Pioneer Award
- 2006: Tech Museum Tech Laureate Award for Environment
- 2002: The inaugural Thomas Alva Edison Award for Innovation
