= Biffa =

Waste management company

Biffa Limited
- Trade name: Biffa
- Company type: Private
- Traded as: LSE: BIFF (2016–2023)
- ISIN: GB00BD8DR117
- Industry: Waste management
- Founded: 1912; 114 years ago in Wembley, London, England
- Founder: Richard Henry Biffa
- Headquarters: High Wycombe, England
- Area served: United Kingdom
- Key people: Michael Topham (CEO)
- Revenue: ▼£1,042.0 million (2021)
- Operating income: ▼£44.2 million (2021)
- Net income: ▼£(40.5) million (2021)
- Owner: Energy Capital Partners (2023–present)
- Number of employees: 8,238 (2021)
- Website: biffa.co.uk

Biffa Limited is a waste management company headquartered in High Wycombe, England. It provides collection, landfill, recycling and special waste services to local authorities and industrial and commercial clients in the United Kingdom. In 2017 it was the UK's second-largest waste-management company. It was listed on the London Stock Exchange until it was acquired by the private-equity firm Energy Capital Partners in January 2023.

== History ==
The company, which was originally engaged in the removal and sale of ashes and clinker from London power stations, was founded in Wembley by Richard Henry Biffa as Richard Biffa Limited, in 1912.

In 1958 Richard Henry Biffa's grandson, Richard Charles Biffa, joined the business and after becoming general manager in 1963, grew the business organically and by acquisition. The business was acquired by British Electric Traction in 1971 and by Severn Trent for £212 million in 1991. It acquired the American-owned UK Waste for £380 million in 2000.

Severn Trent demerged the company to a consortium formed by Global Infrastructure Partners, Montagu Private Equity and Uberior Co-Investment in 2008. It acquired recycling firm Greenstar UK for £135 million in 2010.

The company was re-listed on the London Stock Exchange on 17 October 2016. In June 2022, Biffa received a buyout proposal from private-equity firm Energy Capital Partners at £4.45 a share, a 37% premium to the share price, valuing the company at £1.36 billion. In January 2023, the takeover was agreed, with shareholders receiving 410 pence per share and the shares were suspended on the London Stock Exchange on 27 January 2023.

== Operations ==
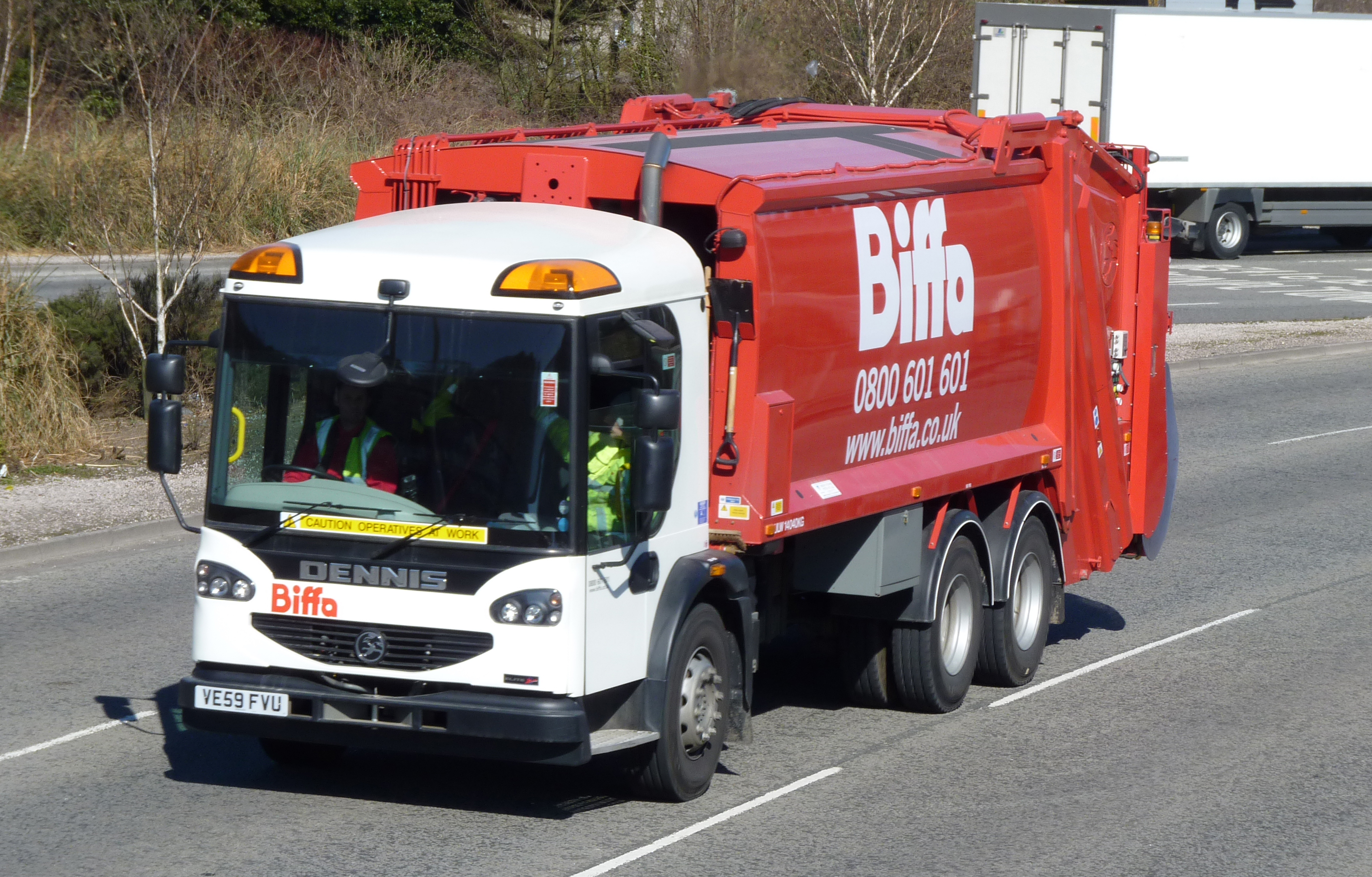
A Biffa Dennis Eagle rubbish truck in Plymouth in March 2010

Biffa covers 95% of the UK. The company runs two Material Recycling Facilities (MRF).

== Prosecutions for illegal activities ==
Biffa has been prosecuted for the following breaches of environmental waste export laws:

- The company was convicted of four breaches of waste shipment regulations during the period 2018–2019.
- The company was convicted of attempting to export used nappies and materials illegally in 2020.
- In 2021, the company was found guilty in a case brought about by the Environment Agency, having attempted to illegally export banned household waste items, including plastic bags, tins, clothing and condoms - incorrectly identified as waste paper. The company was fined £1.5 million, and severely rebuked by Judge Shane Collery QC, who described Biffa as "having shown no contrition" for this crime, referring to their actions as "reckless, bordering on deliberate".

== See also ==
- List of waste management companies
