= Waste Connections of Canada =

Waste Connections of Canada Inc.

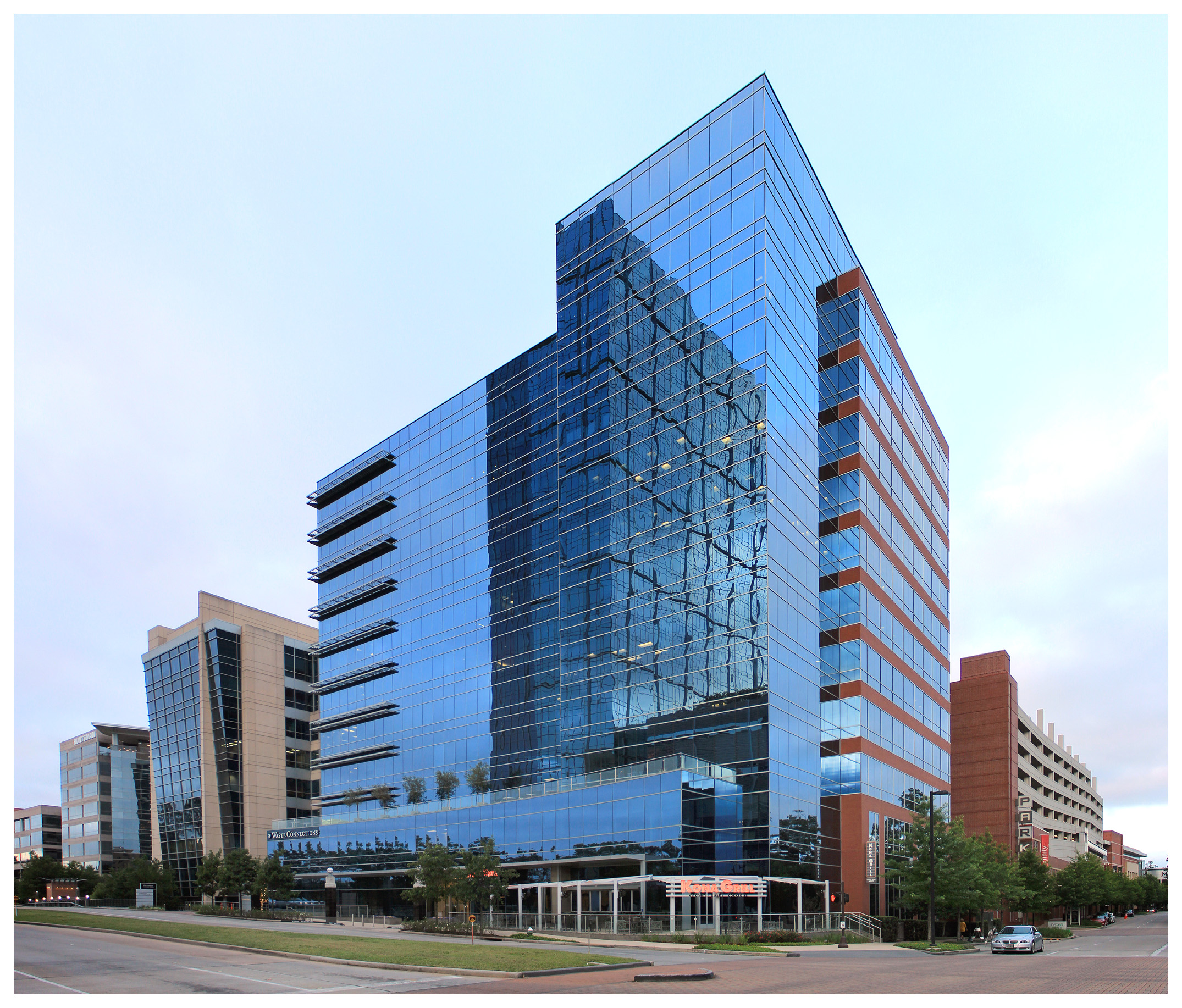
- Waste Connections U.S. headquarters in The Woodlands, Texas
- Formerly: Progressive Waste Solutions (2000–2017)
- Type: Subsidiary
- Industry: Waste management
- Founded: 2000; 26 years ago
- Headquarters: Toronto, Ontario, Canada
- Key people: Ronald J. Mittelstaedt (CEO)
- Services: Waste collection
- Parent: Waste Connections (2017–present)
- Website: wasteconnectionscanada.com

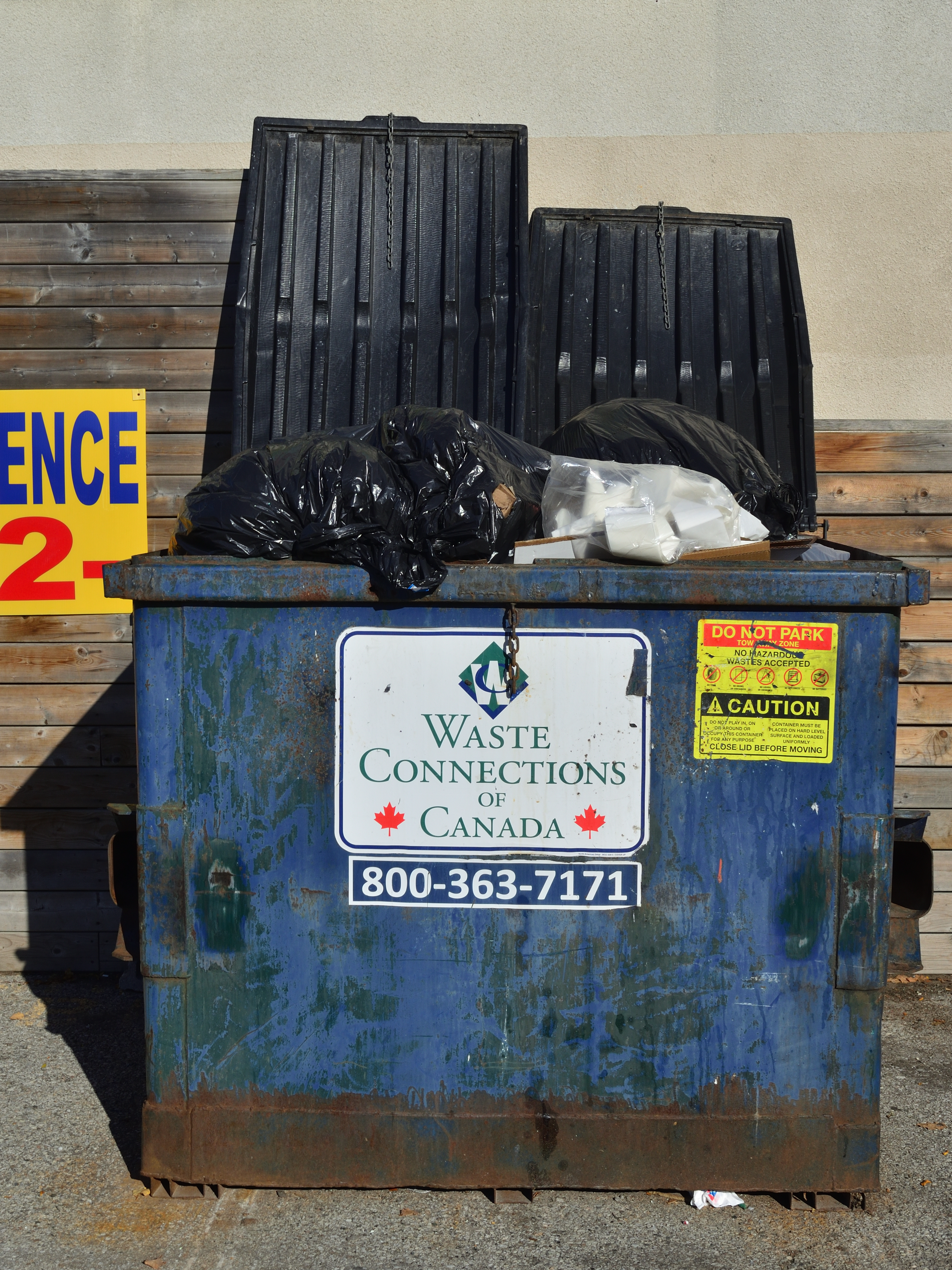
A Waste Connections garbage bin

Waste Connections of Canada Inc., formerly Progressive Waste Solutions, is a waste collection company, that provides non-hazardous solid waste collection, recycling, composting, renewable energy, and landfill disposal services to commercial, industrial, municipal, and residential customers throughout the United States and Canada. The company is based in Toronto, and its headquarters in the United States is in The Woodlands, Texas.

In 2016, Progressive Waste Solutions merged with Waste Connections, a New York Stock Exchange-traded company (NYSE: TSX), becoming the third-largest solid waste management company in North America with a network of operations in 40 U.S. states, the District of Columbia and five Canadian provinces.

Following the merger, the company was rebranded in Canada as Waste Connections of Canada in Alberta, British Columbia, Manitoba, and Ontario. It was called Enviro Connexions in Quebec.

== Former corporate names ==
- BFI Canada
- Progressive Waste Solutions
- Waste Services Inc.

== See also ==
- Allied Waste Industries
- Browning-Ferris Industries
- Republic Services
