= Vander Ark =

Vander Ark is a surname. Notable people with the surname include:

- Shanda Vander Ark, convicted murderer of her son, Timothy Ferguson
- Brian Vander Ark, lead singer of the Verve Pipe
- Brad Vander Ark, bass guitarist of the Verve Pipe
- Jon Vander Ark, American business executive, president of Republic Services
- Steven Vander Ark, librarian, creator of the Harry Potter Lexicon website
