= Browning-Ferris Industries =

North American waste management company

- BFI logo
- Industry: Waste management
- Founded: 1968; 58 years ago (as American Refuse Systems); Energy Corridor; Houston, Texas, U.S.
- Founder: Tom Fatjo
- Defunct: March 1999
- Fate: Acquired
- Successor: Republic Services
- Headquarters: Houston, Texas, U.S.
- Area served: North America
- Parent: Allied Waste
- Website: www.bfi.com at the Wayback Machine (archived April 9, 1997)

Browning-Ferris Industries (BFI) was a North American waste management company that was bought out in 1999.

== History ==
BFI was founded in Houston, Texas. The company was initially known as American Refuse Systems, and it opened its first landfill in 1968. The company soon became the first waste hauler on the New York Stock Exchange, after purchasing the Browning-Ferris Machinery Company, and changing their name to Browning-Ferris Industries. BFI was an early competitor to Waste Management, Inc. BFI and Waste Management both began to buy the locally owned companies and create national brands. Many of these companies had failed in the early 1970s after failing to adapt to new environmental regulations.

By 1988, BFI was the second largest public company in the waste management industry, serving more than 4.5 million residential customers. By 1992, it had 26,000 employees, operated in ten countries, and reported sales of 3 billion dollars. The company owned more than 90 landfills.

In 1980, a manager at BFI in Burlington, Vermont started a rival waste collection company, Kelco Disposal. As Kelco found success, in 1982, BFI started a campaign of anti-competitive predatory pricing with the purpose of putting Kelco out of business. In 1984, Kelco sued BFI to stop this activity. The US federal courts agreed with Kelco, and ordered BFI to pay penalties of more than US$6 million. BFI appealed the cases, claiming that the decision violated the Eighth Amendment's prohibition of excessive bail, an argument that was rejected by the Supreme Court upholding the fine.

In 1997, some local units of BFI were sold to Superior Services (later acquired by Onyx), Waste Management, Inc., and Waste Connections, Inc. The remainder of the company was sold to Allied Industries (later Allied Waste Industries), together with private equity firms The Blackstone Group and Apollo Management, in 1999. In 2008, Allied Waste was acquired by Republic Services Group based in Florida.

BFI had its headquarters in the Eldridge Place 1 and 2 buildings in the Energy Corridor area of Houston, Texas.

== Services ==
At its founding in 1967, the company began by collecting residential waste in the suburbs of Houston. By 1968, it had expanded into commercial and light industrial markets, and opened its first landfill. The company entered the recycling business in 1970, processing waste fibers and waste paper. From 1983 to 1990, it also processed toxic waste, such as chemical wastes and asbestos. The company processed medical waste in the 1990s.

== See also ==
- Hal Bernson, Los Angeles City Council member who sued Browning-Ferris for libel in 1992
