= IESI =

Iesi or IESI may refer to:

- IESI-BFC Ltd.
- Jesi, Italy
