= Payne-Gentry House =

Historic house in Missouri, United States

Coordinates: 38.74718057294064°N 90.39952440859781°W

- U.S. National Register of Historic Places
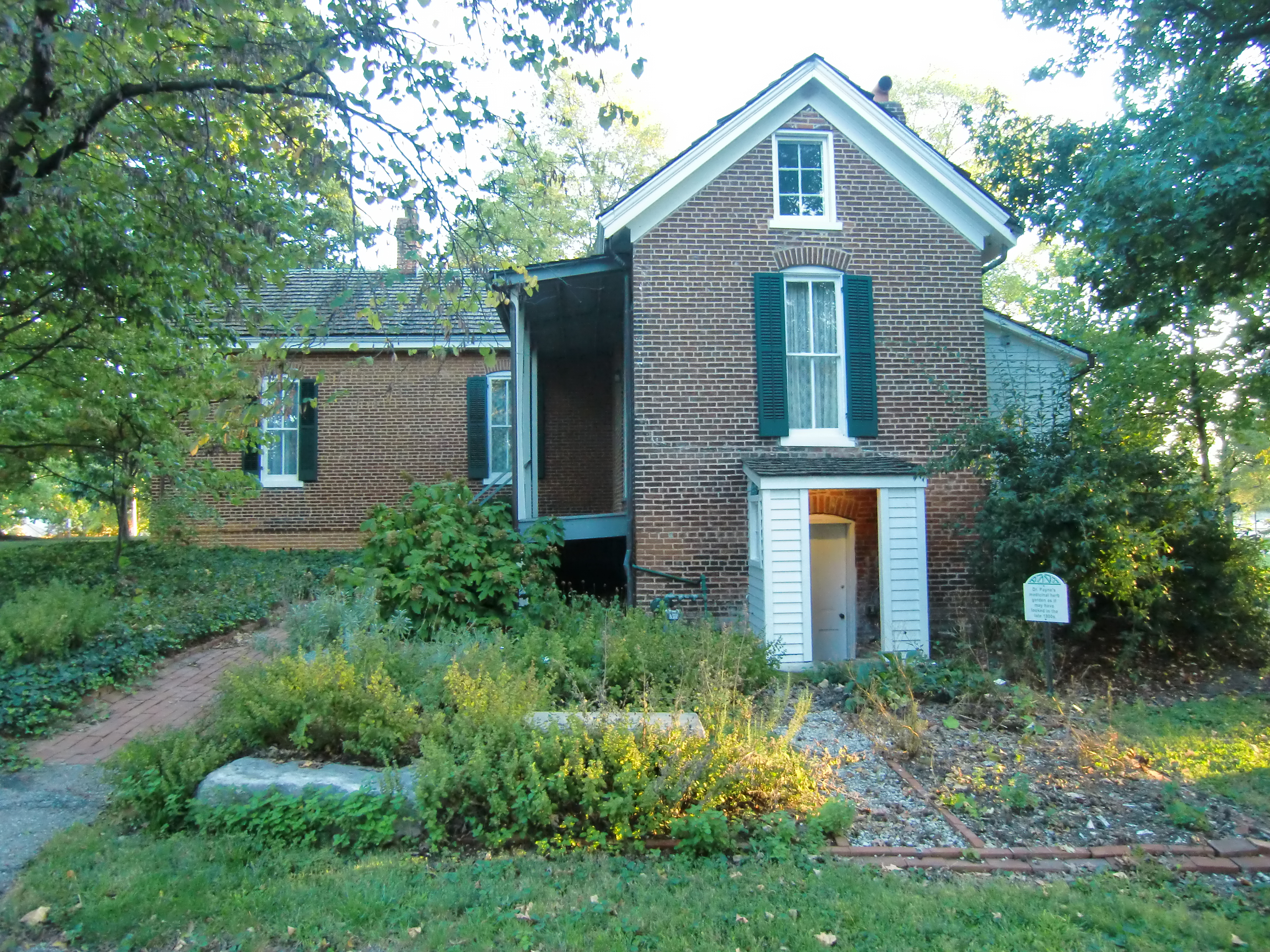

- Location within Missouri Location within the United States
- Location: 4211 Fee Fee Rd, Bridgeton, MO 63044
- Area: less than one acre
- Built: c. 1870
- NRHP reference No.: 79003202

Payne-Gentry House is a historic one story, red brick, vernacular-style cottage home located in Bridgeton, St. Louis County, Missouri. It was built in 1870. The Payne-Gentry house contains the only surviving historic Missouri house with a restored doctor's office from the 19th century period. The house has six entrances and a gable roof. The house was added to the National Register of Historic Places in 1979.

== History ==
The house was built in 1870 as a summer residence for Elbridge Payne and his family. Eventually it became the permanent residence of the Payne-Gentry family. Elbridge's son, William Payne, became the town doctor and operated out of the Payne-Gentry house. The doctor office is the oldest surviving doctor office in Missouri.

Elbridge's daughter, Mary Lee Payne Gentry, became the school mistress for the town's one room schoolhouse.

The home was owned by the heirs of the Payne-Gentry family until 1968 when the city of Bridgeton bought the home. Bridgeton made the land around the home part of Gentry Park, a municipal park with a local reactional center and swimming pool

The home is only open for tours on the first Sunday of every month between 1-4PM.
