= Wintersburg Village, California =

Pre-1913 Japanese pioneer-owned property in California

Coordinates: 33°42′55″N 117°59′43″W

Wintersburg Village is an area in Huntington Beach, California, United States, that represents over a century of Japanese immigration to the United States. The property, consisting of six structures on a 4.5-acre (1.8 ha) parcel, was noted as eligible for the National Register of Historic Places in the City of Huntington Beach General Plan in 2014. The C.M. Furuta Gold Fish Farm and the Wintersburg Japanese Mission are recognized nationally by historians as a rare, pre-1913 Japanese pioneer-owned property with intact physical features that convey the progression of Japanese American history.

Wintersburg Village is representative of Orange County's early agricultural history and the West Coast's immigration and civil liberties history. Three generations of Japanese American experience are represented: immigration of the Issei in the late 19th century, exclusion and Alien Land Laws of the early 20th century, the incarceration of American citizens of Japanese descent during World War II, and the return to California from World War II confinement in 1945.

== History ==
Its prehistory includes centuries of occupation by the Tongva, a native people of California. The property's modern history dates to the land purchase by Japanese immigrant pioneers in 1908, as part of the former land holdings of the Rancho Las Bolsas. A small agrarian complex emerged in the area, and residents built an armory and notable buildings including the Wintersburg Methodist Episocopal church in 1906, now called the Warner Avenue Baptist Church. Wintersburg Village was noted in 1983 as potentially eligible for the National Register of Historic Places during a cultural resource survey. The property was designated a local historic landmark in 1986 by the City of Huntington Beach and noted as such in the City's General Plan.

After ownership for almost a century, the Furuta family, who were no longer farming, made the decision to sell the property. It was purchased in 2004 by Rainbow Environmental Services, a waste disposal company with a waste transfer station nearby. The property was proposed for rezoning to commercial and industrial use by Rainbow Environmental, along with a proposal for demolition of all historic structures. The effort to save and preserve Historic Wintersburg began several years after the property was sold in 2004, when news became public that the new owner planned re-zoning to commercial / industrial uses and demolish all historic and cultural resources. Preservationists began working with Rainbow Environmental in 2011 to purchase the property for historic preservation as a heritage park and for permission to stabilize the structures to prevent demolition by neglect. The goal of historic preservation is to create a permanent heritage site with public park uses.

In July 2012, the Huntington Beach City Council created the Historic Wintersburg Preservation Task Force. In November 2013, the City of Huntington Beach City Council certified the Environmental Impact Report which included an action to rezone the property to industrial and commercial uses, along with demolition of all six historic structures. Following this action, the Ocean View School District acting on behalf of the Oak View Elementary School adjacent to the site, filed two separate lawsuits, one against the City of Huntington Beach regarding the CEQA action and the second against Rainbow Environmental regarding their waste transfer operations. As of November, 2013, the preservation effort focused on purchase of the property, find a compromise preservation plan, or move the buildings before demolition proceeds.

In June 2014, Historic Wintersburg was included on the National Trust for Historic Preservation's annual list of America's 11 Most Endangered Historic Places, which highlights jeopardized American historical properties that need nationwide assistance to achieve preservation goals. Urashima was recognized as a "Community Hero" by the Japanese American Citizens League Pacific Southwest District in September 2014. Rainbow was purchased in October 2014 by Republic Services with the discussions to preserve continuing.

The property was again deemed potentially eligible for the National Register of Historic Places in a historic resources survey prepared for the City of Huntington Beach, pending final approval by the city council in 2015. The property was inspected by representatives from the U.S. National Park Service in June, 2013, and deemed potentially eligible for the National Register of Historic Places under Criterion A, Japanese American Settlement of the American West.

On the morning of February 25, 2022, fire of unknown origin destroyed the 1910 manse (parsonage) building and damaged the 1910 Wintersbug Japanese Mission building. Subsequently remains of both buildings were bulldozed before investigation could take place. The investigations by the Huntington Beach Fire Department and the Huntington Beach Police Department are ongoing as of March 14, 2022.

== Description ==
The site included six extant structures: the 1910 Japanese Presbyterian Mission, 1910 Manse (parsonage), 1934 Great Depression-era Japanese Presbyterian Church, 1912 Furuta bungalow, Furuta barn (1908–1912), and 1947 post-World War II Furuta ranch house. The 19th-Century Wintersburg Village along with other properties in north Orange County was annexed into Huntington Beach in 1957. On Friday, February 25, 2022, two of the oldest structures for the Wintersburg Japanese Mission, founded in 1904, were lost to fire.

Property ownership pre-dates California’s Alien Land Laws of 1913 and 1920—state laws that prohibited those ineligible for citizenship, primarily Japanese immigrants, from property ownership. The property, originally five acres (2.0 ha), was purchased by Reverend Hisakichi Terasawa and Charles Mitsuji Furuta in 1908. In 1912, it was deeded by Reverend Terasawa to Charles Mitsuji Furuta in its entirety, with an understanding the small, northwest portion of the land would house the Japanese Presbyterian Mission.

The property is representative of the era of Japanese pioneer arrival and settlement of the American West, as well as the pursuit of citizenship and civil liberties by early 20th Century Japanese immigrants. Wintersburg Village iincludes both the C.M. Furuta Gold Fish Farm and the Wintersburg Japanese Presbyterian Mission, the oldest Japanese house of worship of any denomination in Orange County and in most of California.

== Wintersburg Japanese Mission ==
Wintersburg Japanese Presbyterian Mission and manse (parsonage) with congregation in 1910. The Mission faced Wintersburg Road, now Warner Avenue, in the Wintersburg Village. This area is now north Huntington Beach, California.

The Wintersburg Japanese Mission originally was founded as a non-denominational, multi-faith and multi-ethnic effort by Christian and Buddhist supporters, first meeting in borrowed spaces in the Wintersburg Village before the acquisition of property in 1909. The clergy who assisted with the founding in 1904 represented the Episcopalian, Methodist and Presbyterian denominations. Original donation ledgers show contributions for the 1910 Mission and Manse (parsonage) buildings from both the Japanese American and European American (referred to as "American Friends") pioneer community from around Orange County. A 1930 history written by Mission clergy, Reverend Kenji Kikuchi, on the official adoption of the Mission as a Church with the Presbyterian U.S.A. notes that the Wintersburg Japanese Mission was known at that time to be "the oldest Japanese church in Southern California".

The Church is one of the fourteen missions established with the help of Dr. Ernest Adolphus Sturge, who was tasked to lead the Japanese Mission effort by the Presbyterian Church U.S.A.

The Mission effort originally was a multi-cultural and multi-faith effort, with involvement by Methodists, Buddhists and Presbyterians. The Church history describes clergy walking into the celery fields to meet and talk with Japanese immigrants in 1902. Originally meeting in a borrowed barn or cottages in Wintersburg Village, the Mission was founded in 1904, constructed its first buildings in 1910, and formally recognized as an official church by the Presbyterian Church U.S.A. in 1930. The church exists today as the Wintersburg Church in Santa Ana, California, and remains a predominantly Japanese American congregation.

In 2014, the present-day Church separated from the Presbyterian Church U.S.A., returning to its roots as a non-denominational Christian church. The Church was issued a formal apology by the Presbytery of Los Ranchos in 2014 for non action more than seven decades earlier during World War II. The apology explained that "while members of the Japanese-American congregation were being relocated, neither the national Presbyterian denomination nor the regional presbytery took a stand on behalf of their members, taking a mostly hands-off position." The Presbytery of Los Ranchos determined the Church could retain their property and assets, and would not have to meet a reimbursement requirement for leaving the denomination. The official apology acknowledged, "though we cannot remove the pain that has been experienced as a result of the neglect of our forebears, we wish to extend our deepest apologies to the generations of Wintersburg Presbyterian Church who were and continue to be affected by the abandonment of your brothers and sisters...for the absence of advocacy, the neglect of care and failure of leadership of the church parents we commonly claim, the people of your presbytery humbly request your congregation’s forgiveness."

== Japanese Language Schools supported by the Wintersburg Mission ==
The Wintersburg Japanese Presbyterian Mission supported four Japanese Language Schools, or gakuens, in Orange County: Garden Grove, Talbert (present-day Fountain Valley), Costa Mesa and Laguna Beach, documented by original mission documents and oral histories of congregants. The Japanese Language Schools served as multi purpose community centers built by local residents, supported by both Christians and Buddhists, and provided language classes, religious services, and also served as meeting places for local farmers.

The sole extant Japanese Language School building is preserved within the federally listed historic district of Crystal Cove State Park. During World War II, when Japanese Americans were forcibly removed from the West Coast per Executive Order 9066 to confinement centers, the Laguna Beach Japanese Language School was converted by the U.S. military for their use. The Crystal Cove State Park historical timeline notes, "The purpose was for a coastal defense crew to observe and to furnish data for the guns of a battery for firing at a target." After the war, Japanese American farmers who had leased farmland on the Irvine Ranch were unable to reclaim their farms and homes in the San Joaquin Hills. The Laguna Beach Japanese Language School building today is Cottage #34 and serves as the Crystal Cove State Park's cultural center.

== Wintersburg Mission clergy ==
The first official clergy at the opening of the Mission building in 1910 was Reverend Joseph Kenichi Inzawa, with his wife, Kate Alice Goodman. They also were the first occupants of the manse in 1910. Kenji Kikuchi was one of the longest serving clergy, from 1926 to 1934, and provided one of the detailed oral histories conducted in the 1980s by the oral history program with California State University Fullerton.

Sohei Kowta served as clergy from 1938 to 1942. He was interrogated by the F.B.I. following the attack on Pearl Harbor, along with his neighbor, Charles Mitsuji Furuta. Reverend Kowta is acknowledged as a unifying force in the 1945 War Relocation Authority Final Report for the Community Activities Section of the Colorado River Relocation Center at Poston, Arizona. The report notes, "The maintaining of a united church was made possible by a very tactful moderator, Reverend Sohei Kowta, of the Presbyterian Church, and the fact that relations with the outside denominations was centralized in one commission representing the interested churches...The contact with the outside denominations was of great importance to the Christian group at the center. It was these groups who had taken the most outspoken stand on the evacuation problem and who represented to the center residents the only evidence in 1942 that they were not totally rejected by America."

== C.M. Furuta Gold Fish Farm ==
Charles Mitsuji Furuta traveled to America in 1900. Intending to meet his older brother, Soichi, in Hawaii, Furuta was prevented from disembarking due to an outbreak of the Black Plague. He continued on to Tacoma, Washington. After working there several years, he made his way to the developing Wintersburg Village in Southern California's Orange County and found work in the celery fields. One of the first people Furuta met was Reverend Hisakichi Terasawa, an Episcopalian minister who had been enlisted by Dr. Ernest Adolphus Sturge and Reverend Joseph Inazawa to help establish a Japanese mission in Orange County.

Reverend Terasawa began meeting with Japanese laborers in Wintersburg-area agricultural fields in 1902. Upon the advice of Reverend Terasawa, Furuta saved money to buy land. Together they bought in 1908 the five-acre parcel.

By 1912, Reverend Terasawa deeded the five-acre property in full to Furuta, who set aside the northwest corner for the Japanese mission building committee. Furuta returned to Japan in 1912 to meet and marry Yukiko Yajima, and returned with her to America. On their return, Furuta contracted with a Caucasian builder to construct a four-room bungalow on his farm. The finishing touches were made on the house by March 1913-documented in a photograph of Yukiko Furuta standing on the front porch-only months before passage of California's Alien Land Law of 1913 in May of that year.

The passage of the Alien Land Law meant that Charles Furuta was one of the rare Japanese immigrant landowners in California. Furuta worked for local Caucasian farmers (notably on the Cole Ranch in Wintersburg Village), attempted a farming cooperative with other Japanese immigrant pioneers, as well as farmed his own land.

By 1917, he had established the first goldfish pond on his property. By the 1920s, goldfish ponds covered most of the Furuta farm, with a variety of common and exotic fish species. Two other goldfish farms were established in Wintersburg Village during the same time period, one by Furuta's brother-in-law Henry Kiyomi Akiyama and one by Tsurumatsu "T.M." Asari. The Furutas, Akiyamas, and Asaris continued to farm goldfish until forcibly removed from California after the authorization of Executive Order 9066 on February 19, 1942, following the December 7, 1941, attack by Japan at Pearl Harbor, Hawaii.

== World War II forced removal and confinement ==
Charles Furuta, owner of the Furuta Gold Fish Farm, and Reverend Sohei Kowta of the Wintersburg Japanese Church were interrogated on the property by the F.B.I. following the attack on Pearl Harbor. Charles was interrogated in the sunroom of the 1912 Furuta bungalow. Reverend Kowta was interrogated in the 1934 Wintersburg Japanese Church offices. Reverend Kowta was allowed to remain with his family and congregation until the time that all Japanese Americans would be forcibly removed from California.

Furuta first was incarcerated at the Tuna Canyon Detention Station, a former Civilian Conservation Corps camp in Los Angeles County, California. As of March 2016, there are a total of six individuals who have been documented through the efforts of the Tuna Canyon Detention Station Coalition as having been confined at Tuna Canyon, including an elder of the Wintersburg Mission.

On February 19, 1942, Executive Order 9066 established a military exclusion zone and mandated the forced removal of Japanese Americans from the West Coast. By May 1942, all Japanese Americans had been removed from Orange County, California. In Huntington Beach, most were directed to gather at the Pacific Electric Railway station near the Huntington Beach pier, while others were directed to the Japanese Language School in Garden Grove, before being bused to the Colorado River Relocation Center at Poston, Arizona.

The missions followed their congregations and communities into confinement, safeguarding congregants' belongings and providing comfort inside relocation camps. Mission clergy helped those coping with the prospect of leaving their homes for confinement. Clergy continued to provide support during confinement and helped those returning to Southern California after World War II, providing shelter and guidance.

In 1945, upon departure from Poston, the Wintersburg Church's Reverend Kowta was sent to Little Tokyo, Los Angeles, to assist at the Japanese Union Church of Los Angeles. During World War II years, the Pilgrim House for the African American migrant community set up space in the Japanese Union Church building and Little Tokyo became known as Bronzeville. The Japanese Union Church building also was used to store the belongings of Japanese Americans in confinement. The National Park Service notes Reverend Kowta's efforts to help Japanese Americans returning from confinement in Five Views: An Ethnic Historic Site Survey for California: "Rev. Sohei Kowta...recognized the need to establish a center to aid Japanese Americans returning from the concentration camps. Along with the Presbytery and the American Friends Service Committee, he established a resettlement center... known as the Evergreen Hostel, and Rev. Kowta conducted religious services for Union Church members and other residents."

Charles Furuta—identified as a land owner and president of the Japanese Association—was first taken by the F.B.I. to the Tuna Canyon Detention Station in Los Angeles County (since demolished). He later was moved to a Department of Justice enemy alien camp in Lordsburg, New Mexico, which began receiving detainees from California in June, 1942. During his time at Lordsburg there was an incident referred to as the Lordsburg Killings. At the time, Furuta was 61 years old and had lived in the United States for 42 years.

On May 16, 1942, Yukiko Furuta and the Furuta children (Raymond and his wife, Martha, Toshiko, Nobuko, Kazuko, Etsuko and Grace Emiko) were removed from Wintersburg Village to Poston. The Furutas were separated for one year before Charles Furuta was allowed to join his family at Poston. Confined for three years, the Furutas were released to return home to their farm in Wintersburg Village in 1945.

Upon the Furuta family's return to their Wintersburg Village farm, they found the goldfish ponds silted in and the farmland in disrepair. The Furutas spent the next several years recovering the ponds in order to grow water lilies and the land to grow sweet pea flowers. The Furuta flower farm became the largest provider of cut water lily flowers in the United States during the last half of the 20th century, per living family descendants.

== National Trust for Historic Preservation ==
Historic Wintersburg was named one of America's 11 Most Endangered Historic Places on June 24, 2014, by the National Trust for Historic Preservation. The trust considered it significant as a Japanese-owned property acquired prior to the Webb-Haney Act, or California Alien Land Law of 1913, which prohibited Japan-born residents from owning property. Wintersburg Village was considered to be endangered by the trust because the land owner rezoned the property in 2013 from residential to commercial / industrial uses, and submitted plans to demolish all six of the site's historic structures. The structures range in age from 70 to 105 years, marking the history of Japanese settlement of the American West as well as the return to California after World War II forced evacuation and confinement in detention and relocation centers.

The National Trust for Historic Preservation, Washington, D.C., named Historic Wintersburg a National Treasure in October 2015, remarking, "this place honors the Japanese-American experience and the longstanding impact of a people whose tangible history was largely erased by anti-immigrant policies and incarceration during the 20th century." The National Trust stated that Historic Wintersburg is "among the only surviving Japanese-American properties acquired before California passed anti-immigrant land laws in 1913 and 1920. Further, as the entire Wintersburg community was incarcerated during World War II, the site is iconic of our nation’s civil rights history and a reminder of the struggle for social justice that many immigrant communities continue to face today."

== Japanese Mission Trail ==
Wintersburg Village is considered part of California’s unrecognized Japanese Mission Trail, a new term used by Historic Wintersburg in Huntington Beach, author Mary Adams Urashima, to bring attention to the migration and settlement path of California's Japanese pioneer communities. In 1885, the first Japanese mission in California—organized six decades after the last Spanish mission in 1823—marked the beginning of an effort by Japanese pioneers to establish communities as they assimilated to American life. The Japanese missions sprang up in communities where immigrants established themselves for work. In Orange County, work in the early 1900s was available in the celery, sugar beet, and chili pepper fields surrounding Wintersburg Village and nearby Smeltzer (both now part of Huntington Beach).

The Japanese missions along the West Coast were assisted through the work of Ernest Adolphus Sturge, M.D., Missionary of the Presbyterian Board to the Japanese in California with the Presbyterian Church U.S.A. Sturge, who had traveled extensively throughout Asia prior to his role with the Presbyterian Church, was presented the Order of the Rising Sun by the Emperor of Japan for his work with Japanese immigrants in America. Sturge was appointed by the national Presbyterian Church in 1886 to serve as a missionary for the Presbyterian Church in California and named General Superintendent of the Japanese Presbyterian Churches, from 1886 to 1934. His biography notes Dr. Sturge and his wife "cheerfully taught classes of Japanese students who were anxious to learn the English language." The couple is acknowledged as among the first to initiate mission efforts in the Japanese immigrant community in America.

In 1903, colleagues of Dr. Sturge published a book in honor of the fifteenth anniversary of his mission work, The Spirit of Japan, registered with the Library of Congress on February 11, 1904, by his protégé, Reverend Joseph Kenichi Inazawa, who later served as clergy at the Wintersburg Mission. There is an entry in the book from Kisaburo Uyeno, His Imperial Japanese Majesty's Consul in San Francisco, noting in 1903 that Sturge already had been living and working with the Japanese in America for twenty years. The Wintersburg Japanese Presbyterian Mission was the fifth mission established with the help of Dr. Sturge and his colleagues. The previous missions included San Francisco, Salinas, Watsonville and Los Angeles, California. Dr. Sturge was present at the dedication of the Wintersburg Japanese Presbyterian Mission in 1910, noted in a Mission program and group photograph taken at the dedication.

== Preservation ==
2015: In February 2015, the story of the Furuta family was featured in an advance screening of the public television series, Our American Family, at the Japanese American National Museum in Los Angeles, California. Our American Family: The Furutas aired nationally on public television in Spring 2015.

On June 2, 2015, Orange County Superior Court Judge Gail Andler ordered the City of Huntington Beach to rescind within 45 days the 2013 California Environmental Quality Act (CEQA) action---the Environmental Impact Report (EIR)---that rezoned the Historic Wintersburg property to commercial / industrial and included the approval for demolition. This action in favor of the Ocean View School District's complaint followed the June 1, 2015, Huntington Beach City Council meeting at which the Council voted to rescind the EIR and Statement of Overriding Consideration (the justification for demolition).

On June 3–4, 2015, the Historic Wintersburg Preservation Task Force enlisted the National Trust for Historic Preservation and the Urban Land Institute (ULI) for a Technical Assistance Panel (TAP) which will result in findings and recommendations regarding alternatives for the property's historic preservation. A report on potential alternatives for the preservation and reuse of the property was released by the ULI in September 2015.

In October 2015, the National Trust for Historic Preservation named Historic Wintersburg a National Treasure, one of fewer than 60 in the United States at the time, and one of two National Treasures representing Japanese American history.

2016: May 25, 2016, Republic Services management stated they would not demolish the historic structures and would work with the Historic Wintersburg Preservation Task Force and stakeholders on a "mutually beneficial plan".

In August and September 2016, cultural monitoring for potential artifacts was conducted during street work on the west side of the property along Nichols Lane in the area of the original pioneer fence line, in coordination with the City of Huntington Beach public works department. Artifact collection in this area resulted in findings of bottles from different time periods, farm implements, kitchenware, and large snail shells from the goldfish farm era.

On September 14, 2016, a professional inspection and consultation was conducted by an historic preservation architect, to determine the specific stabilization needs of each of the six structures on the Historic Wintersburg property and prepare for fumigation of the buildings.

2017: 75-YEAR ANNIVERSARY: February 19, 2017, marks the 75th anniversary of Executive Order 9066 signed by President Franklin Delano Roosevelt, which mandated the forced removal and incarceration of Japanese Americans on the West Coast of which 75 percent were American-born citizens. This action led to the removal and incarceration of all Japanese Americans from Orange County, California, including everyone associated with Historic Wintersburg.

February 19, 2017, In commemoration of Executive Order 9066, the Army uniform of Kazuo Masuda—a member of the "Go For Broke" 442nd and, along with his family, a congregant of the Wintersburg Japanese Mission—was displayed at an exhibit at the Smithsonian National Museum of American History in Washington DC, Smithsonian Marks 75th Anniversary of Executive Order 9066.

At the end of May 2017, Republic Services was requested by the Trust for Public Land to obtain a property appraisal to establish current market value in order to move forward with the discussions regarding the purchase of the property for historic preservation.

On July 17, 2017, the Trust for Public Land and Historic Wintersburg Preservation Task Force provided to the Huntington Beach City Council a presentation at their televised meeting on the status of the historic preservation effort and the negotiations to purchase the property for historic preservation and public park purposes. The committee would continue to meet to discuss the site but became an independent group of residents.

August 19 - September 30, 2017, Historic Wintersburg was part of a joint exhibition with the Smithsonian Institution at the Heritage Museum of Orange County, Hometown Teams: How Sports Shape America.

On August 30, 2017, a request was made of Republic Services to allow the California State University Long Beach (CSULB) archaeology department to conduct preliminary archaeological survey of the farm and mission property, at no cost to Republic. Preservationists repeated their concerns to Republic Services regarding brush removal and weed abatement, to reduce fire risk.

On September 11, 2017, Republic Services informed the preservation group that they declined a preliminary site walk by CSULB archaeologists and would resume discussions after finishing some construction deadlines at their waste transfer station.

On September 21, 2017, Preserve Orange County named Historic Wintersburg one of Orange County, California's "most endangered " historic properties.

2018 - 2020 On January 26, 2018, Republic Services, Inc., the waste management company which owns the National Treasure Historic Wintersburg property, stated they plan to sell the Historic Wintersburg property to Public Storage for self-storage development.

2021 The grassroots preservation effort to save endangered Historic Wintersburg is partnered with and under the 501c3 umbrella of the nonprofit Heritage Museum of Orange County.

Former California state assemblyman Warren Furutani writes about the prejudice and harassment targeting Historic Wintersburg in The Rafu Shimpo Los Angeles Japanese Daily News.

2022 Historic Wintersburg remains an endangered National Treasure historic place. It is still owned by Republic Services.

== Notable people ==
Historic Wintersburg’s history includes: James Kanno, first U.S. Japanese American mayor; Stephen Tamura, first Japanese American attorney in Orange County and California’s first Japanese American supreme court justice; the Masuda family, specifically mentioned by President Ronald Reagan when signing Civil Liberties Act of 1988; Clarence Nishizu, first Japanese American Orange County Grand Jury appointee and an invited guest with President Reagan at the Civil Liberties Act signing; Reverend Joseph Inazawa and Kate Alice Goodman, Mission clergy making international headlines with interracial marriage in 1910; Reverend Sohei Kowta, a unifier of religious organizations at the Colorado River Relocation Center, Poston, Arizona; Charles Mitsuji Furuta, first Japanese immigrant baptized as Christian in Orange County, a founder of the Wintersburg mission, and president of the Smeltzer Japanese Association; Yasumatsu Miyawaki, owner of the first Japanese market on Main Street Huntington Beach, California, in 1911; 1912 Japanese aviator Koha Takeishi; and World War II Medal of Honor nominees.
