= St. Mary's Parish (Bridgeton, Missouri) =

Coordinates: 38°44′52″N 90°23′29″W

St. Mary of the Assumption Parish in Bridgeton, Missouri was a Catholic parish in northwestern St. Louis County, located within the Archdiocese of St. Louis. Founded in 1851, the parish population expanded with suburban development at such exhilarating a rate in the 1950s and 1960s that seven new parishes were created in the area. This parish was closed in 2001 due to planned expansion of St. Louis Lambert Airport. The parish church and related buildings were acquired by the airport and razed in 2004.

== History ==
St. Mary's was founded in 1851 by Jesuit priests from St. Ferdinand Parish of Florissant, Missouri. The parish's grade school, St. Mary's School, operated from 1886 until 1999. The church and school were located on the southwest corner of the intersection of Natural Bridge Road and Long Road. The Jesuits (SJ) ran the parish from its origin through the erection of the new church, school, and rectory that were built in 1954. They were led by pastor Fr. J.T. Morrell, SJ. The new school included 14 classrooms, a faculty lounge, a cafeteria, band loft above the church, and a lounge under the church. The church was attached to the school in order to provide space for the gymnasium. The new church in the parish masterplan was never built due to a lack of funds.

The Sisters of St. Joseph of Carondelet (CSJ) operated and taught in the grade school until 1987; they also directed St. Mary's High School. The high school operated from 1944 to 1956. During the 1950s and 1960s, the population of the parish increased so much that the Archdiocese of St. Louis redrew boundaries and founded seven new parishes to serve the needs of the deanery. At one point in the late 1960s, the enrollment at St. Mary's School topped 720 students.

Most graduates of St. Mary's School attended high school at St. Thomas Aquinas in Florissant. This later became known as St. Thomas Aquinas-Mercy after merging with Mercy High School in University City in September 1985. Many girls were accepted to Incarnate Word Academy in Normandy, Missouri, and boys were accepted to Christian Brothers College in Clayton, De Smet Jesuit High School in Creve Coeur, and St. Louis University High in the City of St. Louis. Public schools included Pattonville Senior High School and Ritenour Senior High School.

The following parishes were formed from families originally of St. Mary's Parish. When the parish was closed, many remaining St. Mary's families moved to these parishes.

- Our Lady of Mercy, Hazelwood, MO
- St. Blaise, St. Louis County, MO
- St. Gregory (the Great), St. Ann, MO (now Holy Trinity)
- St. Jude, St. Louis County, MO
- St. Kevin, St. Ann, MO (now Holy Trinity)
- St. Lawrence the Martyr, Bridgeton, MO
- St. William, Woodson Terrace, MO (now Holy Trinity)

== Parish mergers ==
After the closure of St. Mary's, parishioners joined the parishes listed above that had developed from St. Mary's. Due to a declining number of Catholics in the northwest deanery and airport expansion, several parishes have combined.

In 2003, St. Gregory, St. Kevin, and St. Williams merged. The new parish is called Holy Trinity. Holy Trinity's church, parish center, rectory, convent, and youth center is located at the former St. Gregory Parish on St. Luke Lane, and the school is located at the former St. Kevin Parish on St. Henry Lane.

In 2004, St. Lawrence the Martyr was purchased as part of the St. Louis-Lambert Airport expansion as well. St. Lawrence the Martyr merged with St. Blaise to form Holy Spirit Parish in 2004. Holy Spirit is located at the former St. Blaise Parish on Parkwood Lane in Maryland Heights. The same week that St. Lawrence and St. Blaise merged, Our Lady of Mercy in Hazelwood closed, and its members joined St. Martin de Poerres in Hazelwood.

St. Jude continues to operate.
