= Julie Anderson =

Documentary film maker

- Occupation: Documentary film maker
- Known for: Academy Award nomination
- Notable work: God Is the Bigger Elvis

Julie Anderson is a documentary film maker. On January 24, 2012, she was nominated for an Academy Award for the film God Is the Bigger Elvis.
