= Waste Connections =

North American integrated waste services company

Waste Connections, Inc.
- Type: Public
- Traded as: TSX: WCN; S&P/TSX 60 component
- ISIN: CA94106B1013
- Industry: Waste management
- Founded: 1997; 29 years ago in Folsom, California
- Headquarters: The Woodlands, Texas
- Key people: Ronald J. Mittelstaedt (president and CEO)
- Revenue: ▲US$4.2 billion (2021)
- Number of employees: 19,998 (2021)
- Subsidiaries: Waste Connections of Canada; R360 Environmental Solutions
- Website: wasteconnections.com

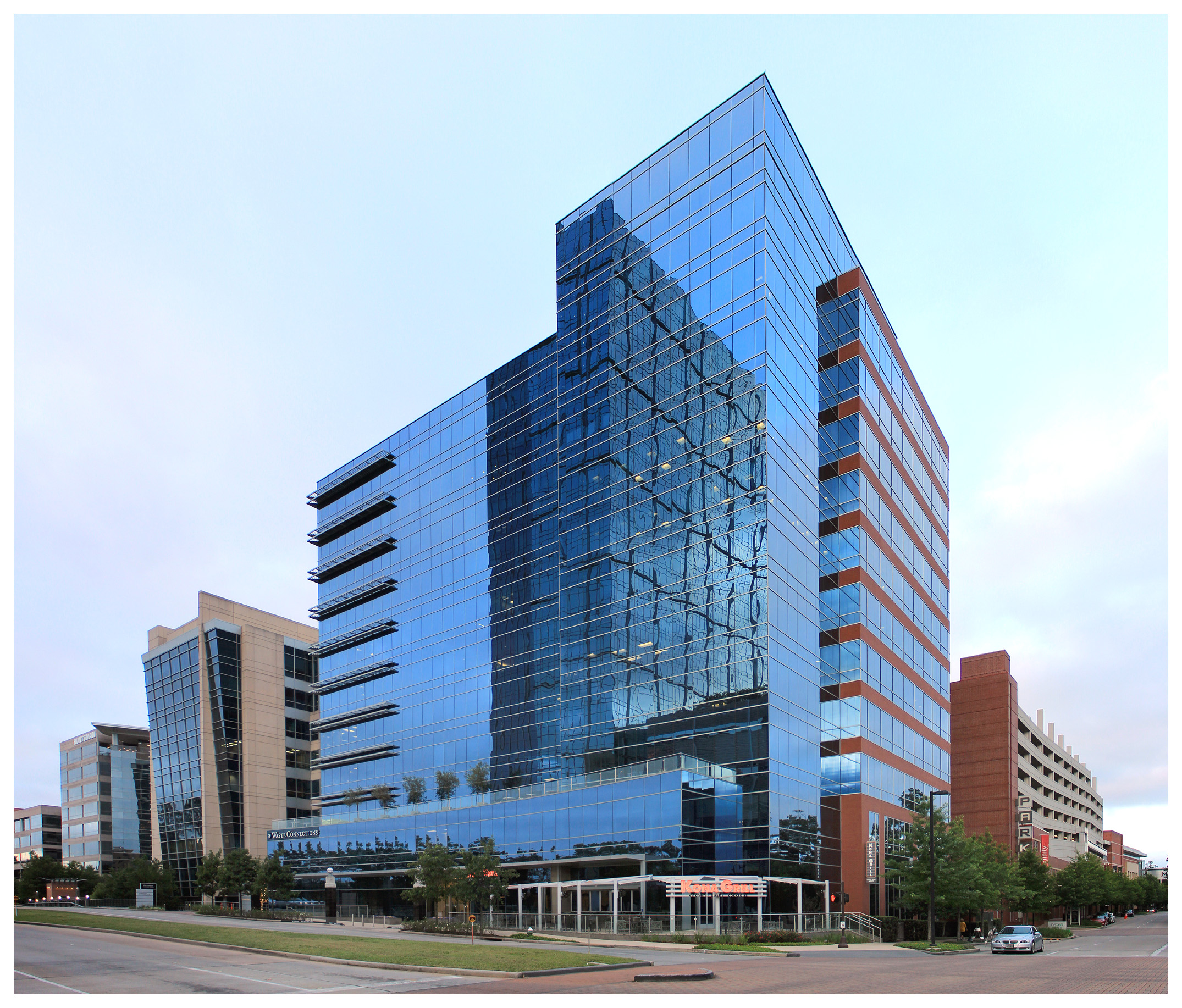

Waste Connections, Inc. is a North American integrated waste services company that provides waste collection, transfer, disposal and recycling services, primarily of solid waste. It has operations in both the United States and Canada. Its headquarters is located in The Woodlands, Texas. It is the third largest waste management company in North America.

== History ==
The company was founded in 1997 by a group of professionals in Washington and Idaho with industry-related experience: James Cutler, Brad Bishop, Frank Cutler and Ron Mittelstaedt. Waste Connections, Inc. expanded very quickly. Within about a year of its founding the company decided to go public, launching its IPO in May 1998. The company then slowly expanded into California and the western United States. As of 2011, It had operations in 32 of the 50 U.S states. In December 2011, the company announced that it was moving its headquarters from Folsom, CA to The Woodlands, Texas, a suburb of Houston. Chief Executive Officer, Ron Mittelstaedt, cited California's high taxes and dysfunctional legislature as key reasons for the move.

In September 2012, it acquired R360 Environmental Solutions, a Texas waste company specializing in the oil industry. In January 2016, Waste Connections bought Progressive Waste Services of Canada for $2.67 billion. Under the deal, Waste Connections shareholders received 70% of the new company, which moved its tax headquarters to Canada. It later re-branded its Canadian division Waste Connections of Canada.

The company completed 24 acquisitions in 2024 and 13 in 2023. This was part of a broader industry trend of large companies like Waste Management and Republic Services acquiring smaller firms. The 2024 acquisitions added $750 million in annualized revenues to Waste Connections. Notable acquisitions include Royal Waste Services and Waste-Away. The Royal Waste Services entrenches Waste Connections as one of the largest commercial waste companies in New York City. As part of the 2024 acquisitions, Waste Connections added 30 facilities to its Canadian portfolio.

== Operations ==
Waste Connections's primary business is to provide solid waste collection and disposal services. It most often does this through contracts with municipalities to collect the waste in that municipality, for an agreed-upon rate. It also provides services directly to residential, commercial, or industrial customers. In addition, Waste Connections runs landfills for waste disposal (82 solid waste landfills as of September 2019).

In Q3 2017, 67% of revenue was from solid waste collection, 21% from solid waste disposal and transfer, 4% from recycling, 5% from its oil industry waste operations, and 3% from other sources. 16% of revenue was from Canada, with the rest from the United States.

As of 2024, three states in the U.S. passed Extended producer responsibility laws. These laws attempt to decrease externalities by making waste producers have additional responsibility for their products once they enter the waste system. These laws have not been fully implemented in the U.S. but Oregon's law is scheduled to take effect in 2025 and Colorado's is scheduled to take effect in 2026. Waste Connections expects to see additional revenues for their Materials recovery facilities (MRF) as these laws take effect.

Waste Connections is partnered with AMP to use AMP's AI powered robots which facilitate recycling. Waste Connections recycled 2.21 million tons in 2023, and is planning to expand capacity by contracting AMP to build an operate an entirely new MRF in Commerce City, Colorado. It is scheduled to open in 2026.

=== Incidents ===
In September 2019, the investigative journalism program CBC Marketplace installed trackers into bales of plastic and commissioned three plastic recycling companies to process them: GFL Environmental, Merlin Plastics, and Waste Connections Canada. Merlin Plastics shredded and recycled the bales and GFL Environmental incinerated the bales in a waste-to-energy facility. Trackers indicated that Waste Connections dumped the plastic bales into a landfill in Richmond and a junkyard in Surrey, British Columbia instead of recycling them. The company responded "There was some miscommunication and the driver took this load to a waste facility".

In March 2024, Waste Connections opened a relief fund to Val Verde, Live Oak, Hasley Hills, Hillcrest Parkway, Hasley Canyon and Stevenson Ranch residents pay to mitigate noxious fumes that leaked from their Chiquita Canyon Landfill in California. The company states that at least $25 million will be available through the fund, and that they distributed air purifiers to the residents. In June, the EPA announced there was an on-going investigation to the landfill and that Waste Connection could face $59,000 per day in civil penalties if they do not comply with regulations.
