= Rebecca Cammisa =

American documentary filmmaker

- Occupation: Filmmaker
- Awards: Emmy award

Rebecca Cammisa (born 9 July 1966) is an American documentary filmmaker two-times Oscar nominated, Emmy award winner, and founder of Documentress Films.

Her first film Sister Helen (2002), aired on Cinemax, won the 2002 Sundance Film Festival’s Directing Award Documentary. Sister Helen also received an Emmy Award nomination for Outstanding Cultural and Artistic Programming and an Outstanding Directorial Achievement in Documentary Film Award nomination by the Directors Guild of America. The documentary won the Gold Hugo Award for best documentary film at the Chicago International Film Festival, the Jury Prize for best documentary film at the Newport Film Festival, the Best Documentary Film Award at the Nashville Film Festival;, the Freddie Award for outstanding performing by the International Health & Medical Media Awards and a Grand Marnier Foundation film grant. In addition, in 2006 the Museum of Modern Art Film Library acquired Sister Helen for its permanent collection.

Rebecca teamed up with Mr.Mudd Productions to create "Which Way Home" which had its world premiere at the Tribeca Film Festival and its European premiere at the Karlovy Vary Film Festival, both in 2009. The Traverse City Film Festival awarded Which Way Home its Special Jury Prize for Human Rights. When it aired in August of that year on HBO's Documentary Summer series, it reached over 3.5 million viewers. In 2010 Which Way Home won a News & Documentary Emmy Award for Outstanding Informational Programming and received four more nominations in the News & Documentary category. It was also nominated for a 2010 Oscar and to Independent Spirit Award for Best Documentary.

Cammisa was awarded a John Simon Guggenheim Fellowship for Filmmaking, and in 2011, she directed and produced the HBO documentary God Is the Bigger Elvis, which received an Oscar Academy Award nomination for Best Documentary Short Subject on January 24, 2012.

Her 2017 documentary "Atomic Homefront" won the 2019 Robert F. Kennedy Journalism Award for Domestic Television and the 2019 Impact Docs Award for Best Documentary Film and premiered at AFI Docs Film Festival.
