= James Lavino =

American composer and songwriter

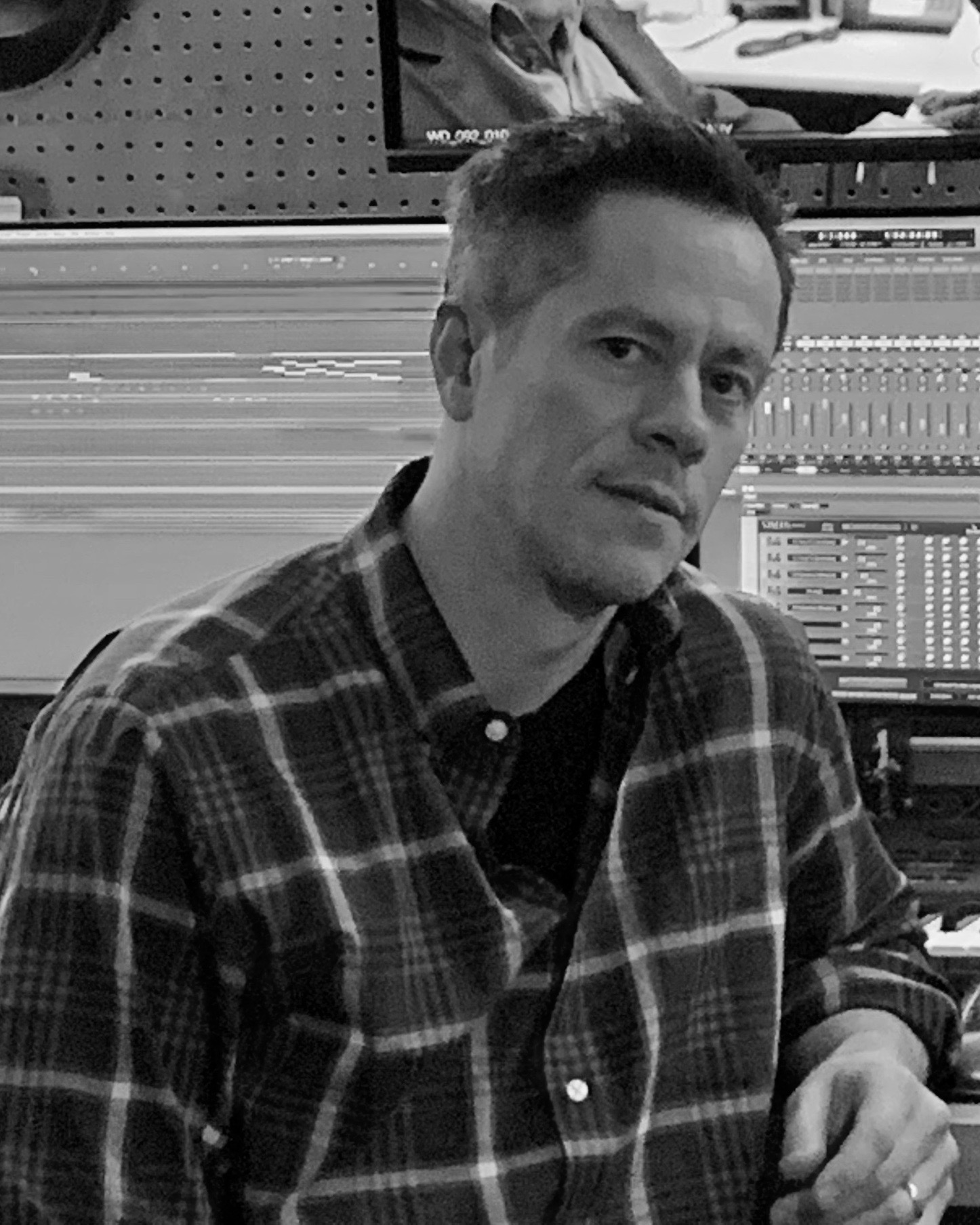
- Lavino in 2019

Background information
- Born: James Dixon Lavino; March 7, 1973 (age 53); Philadelphia, Pennsylvania, United States
- Genres: film score; choral music; indie rock; experimental
- Occupations: Composer, Songwriter
- Member of: Fellwalker
- Website: www.jameslavino.com

James Dixon Lavino (born March 7, 1973) is an American composer and songwriter, known especially for his choral music and his music for film and television.

== Life and career ==
=== Before 2002 ===
Lavino was born in Philadelphia, Pennsylvania. He attended the Haverford School and sang in the choir of St. Peter's Episcopal Church in Society Hill.

Lavino earned a BA in English at Boston University and an MA in English at Yale University. From 1999-2001 he was an Associate Editor at The Paris Review. When he was 26 he began studying composition at The Juilliard School, where he was a student of Behzad Ranjbaran. His first work as a composer was writing songs for the Disney animated show The Book of Pooh.

=== 2002–2010: years in England ===
In 2002, Lavino and his wife moved to London. During this period, he was commissioned to compose choral works for the choirs of St Paul's Cathedral and Westminster Abbey, among others. He was a member of the BBC Symphony Chorus from 2004-2010.

In 2007, Lavino's choral piece An Exhortation of St Peter was performed as part of the Tallis Festival and was broadcast on BBC Radio 3. In 2009, his choral piece They have become bright stars, a commission for the choir of St Paul's Cathedral (UK), was premiered in the presence of Charles, Prince of Wales; Camilla, Duchess of Cornwall; and Prince Andrew, Duke of York. Lavino's piece Nativity, commissioned by Choir & Organ magazine, was featured in the 2007 Classic FM Christmas Concert, and was recorded by the choir of Westminster Abbey (James O'Donnell, cond.) for the Hyperion label.

In 2008, Lavino composed the score for Alex Karpovsky's independent film Woodpecker. The soundtrack featured performances by Radiohead's Colin Greenwood, and members of the band Clap Your Hands Say Yeah. Greenwood also performed on Lavino's score to the film First Person Singular. That same year, Lavino scored an eight-part documentary series for BBC television, called Sissinghurst.

In 2009, Lavino composed the score for the HBO documentary film Which Way Home. The film won an Academy Award and was nominated for an Emmy Award.

Lavino became a citizen of the UK in 2010, and holds dual USA/UK citizenship.

=== 2010–present: return to the US, Fellwalker ===
In 2010, Lavino and his family returned to the USA.

Lavino has been commissioned several times to compose choral pieces to celebrate notable anniversaries, including the 50th anniversary of the founding of the Philadelphia Boys Choir & Chorale (We Live Today), the 100th anniversary of the founding of the Royal Navy FAA (They Have Become Bright Stars), the 200th anniversary of Abraham Lincoln's birth (We Meet Not in Sorrow), and the 750th anniversary of the founding of Merton College, Oxford (Beati Quorum Via).

In 2012, Lavino composed the score for Rebecca Cammisa's Oscar-nominated film God Is the Bigger Elvis. Lavino's other film-music work in recent years has included director D.A. Pennebaker's final film, Unlocking the Cage; Todd Solondz's Wiener-Dog; the Showtime series Murder in the Bayou; and the HBO series Murder on Middle Beach.

In 2014, Lavino was commissioned to compose music for the dedication ceremony of the National 9/11 Memorial & Museum in New York City.

In 2019, Lavino began collaborating with musical performance artist Cynthia Hopkins. They later formed the band Fellwalker. Their debut EP, Shelter, was released in 2020. A second EP, The Long Distance, and a full-length album, Love Is the Means, were released in 2021. They are frequent collaborators with drummers Dave King of The Bad Plus and Charlie Hall of The War on Drugs.

In 2026, Lavino composed the score for the HBO documentary series A Killer Story. He also won an ASCAP Screen Music Award for his score for One Night in Idaho: The College Murders, an Amazon Prime Video documentary series exploring 2022 University of Idaho killings.

== List of works ==
=== Film/TV scores ===
- 2002: withdrawal
- 2003: Cry Funny Happy
- 2005: The Hole Story
- 2007: I am an animal: the story of Ingrid Newkirk and PETA
- 2008: Creative Nature
- 2008: First Person Singular
- 2008: Woodpecker
- 2008: Last Orders
- 2009: Sissinghurst
- 2009: Which Way Home
- 2009: Kevorkian
- 2009: Trust us, this is all made up
- 2010: No one dies in Lily Dale
- 2010: The Road to Carnegie Hall
- 2011: Tent City: USA
- 2011: God Is the Bigger Elvis
- 2012: Rubberneck
- 2012: Well of Dreams
- 2013: Almost in Love
- 2013: Burning Blue
- 2013: Code Black
- 2014: Sex & Broadcasting
- 2015: Freedom
- 2015: Never Here
- 2016: Unlocking the Cage
- 2016: Wiener-Dog
- 2017: One Last Thing
- 2017: In Reality
- 2017: Diana and I
- 2019: Murder in the Bayou
- 2019: The Weekly
- 2020: On the Trail: Inside the 2020 Primaries
- 2020: Murder on Middle Beach
- 2023: Murder in Big Horn
- 2025: One Night in Idaho: The College Murders
- 2026: A Killer Story

=== Choral works ===
- 2000: I will lift up mine eyes
- 2001: The Star in the East
- 2002: Save Me, I God
- 2003: Peaceful was the night
- 2004: An Exhortation of At Peter
- 2005: Turn, Beloved
- 2006: The Eyes of the Lord
- 2006: Do not go gentle into that good night
- 2007: Holy Thursday
- 2007: Their Lonely Betters
- 2007: Nativity
- 2008: Three Auden Settings
- 2009: They have become bright stars
- 2009: We meet not in sorrow
- 2009: Before the paling of the stars
- 2010: VISITATIONS
- 2012: Beati quorum via
- 2015: Tinsel
- 2017: Light
- 2018: We Live Today
- 2021: Magnificat

=== Vocal/instrumental works ===
- 2002: The Valley of Unrest
- 2002: withdrawal
- 2018: Improvisations One (an album of piano music)

=== Arrangements ===
- 2015: Birds (a choral arrangement of the song by Neil Young)
- 2017: This Boy (a choral arrangement of the song by The Beatles)

=== with Fellwalker ===
- 2020: Shelter [EP]
- 2021: The Long Distance [EP]
- 2021: Love Is the Means
- 2023: Redeemable [EP]
- 2024: Blackbird at the Well
