= Warner Avenue Baptist Church =

Historic Baptist church in Huntington Beach, California

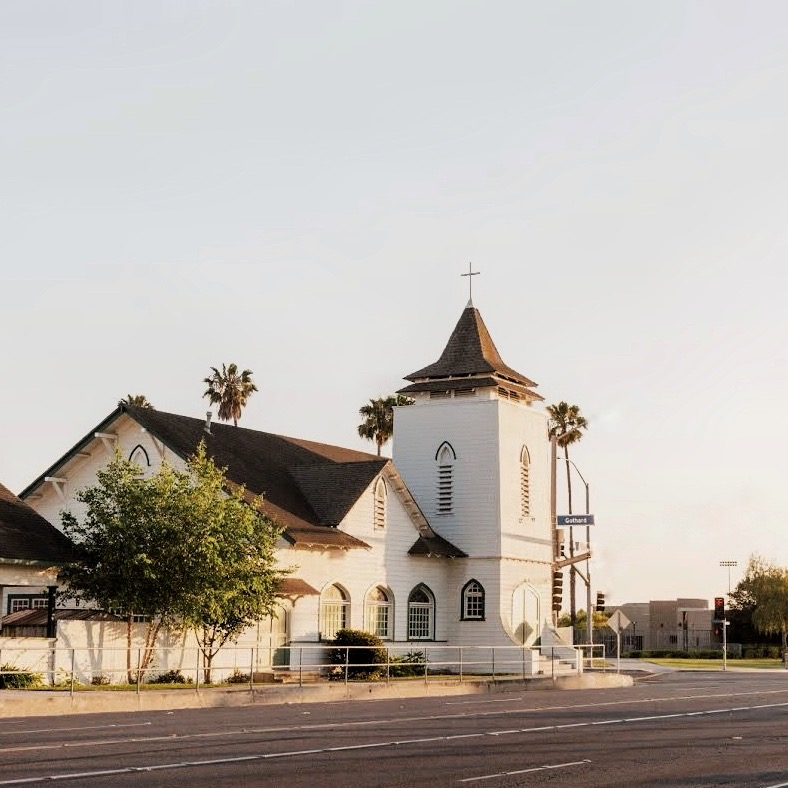
- Warner Avenue Baptist Church
- 33°42′56″N 117°59′59″W
- Location: Huntington Beach, California
- Address: 7360 Warner Ave
- Country: United States
- Denomination: Baptist (1963-present); Methodist Episcopal (1906-1963)
- Website: warnerchurch.com

History
- Status: Active
- Dedicated: March 17, 1907

Architecture
- Functional status: Church
- Style: Vernacular Protestant
- Completed: 1906
- Construction cost: $5,116.74

Specifications
- Materials: Wood-frame construction

Warner Avenue Baptist Church is a historic Baptist church located in Huntington Beach, California, United States. Founded in 1906, the wood-frame building is one of the oldest surviving structures in the city and one of the last remnants of Wintersburg Village.

== History ==
On December 12, 1904, a Community Sunday School was established in Wintersburg Village, an unincorporated agricultural community established in the late 19th century by European and Japanese American farmers in what is now northern Huntington Beach. The school was located in the armory on Wintersburg Avenue, now Warner Avenue. Worship services began in 1905, and residents began to raise money for the construction of a church. A congregation formally organized in January 1906.

The Wintersburg Methodist Episcopal Church was constructed in 1906 and dedicated on March 17, 1907. The site was donated by Henry Winters, a prominent landowner in the area. Members of the Wintersburg village aided in the construction effort. The church was constructed using wooden framing and cost $5,116 ($184,000 in 2025). A nearby residence worth $575 ($20,700 in 2025) was donated by James Cain, a Wintersburg resident for whom Cain Drive is named near the church, and adapted for use as a parsonage.

=== Methodist period (1906–1960s) ===
For several decades, the church functioned as the primary place of worship for Protestants in Wintersburg. The majority of people in Wintersburg were Methodist and petitioned the Southern California Conference of the Methodist Episcopal Church to send a minister. The conference sent Rev. Floyd J. Seamon in December 1905 from Kansas. A quarterly conference was held on January 7, 1906, in which five trustees were elected.

In addition to weekly services, the building hosted community meetings, educational programs, and social gatherings, serving as a focal point of civic life in the rural district. As Huntington Beach expanded in the mid-20th century, suburban development gradually replaced farmland in the surrounding area. By the early 1960s, the Methodist congregation relocated to a newer facility elsewhere in the city, vacating the original Wintersburg church property.

=== Baptist period (1963–present) ===
In 1963, a Baptist congregation was organized by Dr. Edwin Greene. Initially called the Southwest Baptist Church, and the group met in temporary locations including private residences. In 1965, the Baptist congregation purchased the former Wintersburg Methodist church property on Warner Avenue. Upon acquiring the site, the congregation adopted the name Warner Avenue Baptist Church and began using the historic building as its primary place of worship.

The surrounding neighborhood underwent significant redevelopment in the late 20th century. The church continues to operate in the original building. Despite minor alterations for continuous use, the building has retained its original materials and historic, preserving one of the last surviving buildings associated with the Wintersburg settlement.

== Architecture ==
The church is an example of early 20th-century vernacular Protestant ecclesiastical architecture. It was constructed using wood-frame methods common to rural Southern California. The sanctuary is rectangular in plan and capped by a steeply pitched gabled roof. Exterior walls are clad in horizontal wood siding. A prominent four-story steeple rises from the front elevation, serving as a visual landmark in the original flat agricultural landscape.

Tall, narrow window openings line the side elevations, originally fitted with stained glass. The interior was designed using classical methods for accommodating Protestant congregational worship, with a central nave and modest decorative detailing.

The original massing, roof form, materials, and principal architectural features remain intact. Alterations have generally been limited in scope, and the church structure retains early 20th-century styling.
