= On the Trail: Inside the 2020 Primaries =

2020 documentary following female journalists during the 2020 primaries

- Film poster
- Directed by: Katie Hinman; Toby Oppenheimer
- Produced by: Amy Entelis; Katie Hinman; Courtney Sexton
- Music by: James Lavino
- Production company: CNN
- Distributed by: HBO Max
- Release date: August 6, 2020
- Country: United States
- Language: English

On the Trail: Inside the 2020 Primaries is a 2020 American political documentary film directed by Katie Hinman and Toby Oppenheimer. It is the first film to be released by CNN. The film premiered on August 6, 2020, on HBO Max.

== Premise ==
The film covers the journey of a veteran team of female journalists at CNN in the volatile environment of the 2020 Democratic Party presidential primaries. Starting just before the Iowa caucuses, the journalists are followed as they tackle what it takes to survive and become a top political reporter and adapt to life on the road.
