= Chiquita Canyon Landfill =

Project
- Opening date: 1972
- Status: closed
- Size: 639 acres (259 ha)
- Owner: Waste Connections

Location
- Interactive map of Chiquita Canyon Landfill
- Coordinates: 34.432°N 118.646°W
- Country: United States
- County: Los Angeles
- Region: Santa Clarita Valley
- Community: Castaic
- Address: 29201 Henry Mayo Drive

The Chiquita Canyon Landfill is a 639-acre (259 ha) landfill in Castaic, California, United States. Located in the Santa Clarita Valley in northwestern Los Angeles County along State Route 126, it is owned and operated by Waste Connections. The landfill stopped accepting trash at the end of 2024 after restrictions were placed on the operations due to ongoing smoldering chemical reactions in a portion of the site. The solid-waste landfill had been disposing of residential and commercial waste since 1972 by compacting layers of trash and covering those layers daily with soil.

== Impacts of a chemical reaction ==
A rare chemical reaction deep within the landfill probably began in May 2022. The landfill's containment systems were overwhelmed with rainwater filtering through the rotting garbage. Oxygen may have intruded below the landfill cover causing the generation of extreme heat, production of excessive leachate, and the buildup of pressure within a 35-acre (14 ha) closed portion of the site. Hot, contaminated water has been forced to the surface, occasionally erupting like a geyser. This leachate has changed the landfill gas to have a nauseating, sulphuric odor, impacting thousands of nearby residents.

The company has community air quality monitoring stations in Val Verde and in Hasley Canyon Park in Castaic. While the residents of Val Verde have been smelling odors for many years, neighborhoods as far away as Stevenson Ranch have complained to the South Coast Air Quality Management District about the overwhelming stench. In 2024, the district received 13,000 odor complaints. A Community Relief Program by the company was instituted to provide funds to assist residents who want to relocate temporarily. The Los Angeles Regional Water Quality Control Board denied permission to expand into an additional cell in late 2024, expressing concerns about the odors and the landfill's stability during a potential earthquake. After repeated enforcement actions and abatement orders had not brought actions resulting in sufficient reduction in the odors, the county of Los Angeles filed a lawsuit against the owners in December 2024. The landfill, which was accepting roughly 2 million tons (1.8 Mt) of solid waste annually, was closed to future waste disposal on New Year's Day. The underground burn zone continued to grow, reaching an estimated 90 acres (36 ha) by March 2025.

On November 16, 2026, a chemical plume rose from site when workers digging encountered a deposit of gases. An evacuation advisory was issued for nearby neighborhoods.
