= Which Way Home =

2009 documentary film by Rebecca Cammisa

- Directed by: Rebecca Cammisa
- Produced by: Rebecca Cammisa
- Cinematography: Lorenzo Hagerman; Eric Goethals
- Edited by: Pax Wassermann; Madeleine Gavin
- Music by: James Lavino
- Production company: Mr. Mudd
- Distributed by: HBO Films
- Release date: January 31, 2009
- Running time: 90 minutes
- Country: United States
- Languages: English; Spanish

Which Way Home is a 2009 documentary film directed by Rebecca Cammisa that follows several children who are attempting to get from Mexico and Central America to the United States on top of a freight train that crosses Mexico known as "La Bestia" (The Beast). Cammisa received a Fulbright Scholar Grant to make the documentary in 2006. The film premiered on HBO on August 24, 2009.

== Synopsis ==
Every year, thousands of Latin American migrants embark on a journey of hundreds of miles to reach the United States, with many traveling atop freight trains. Approximately five percent of these solo travelers are children. Amid ongoing debates on immigration reform in the United States, the documentary 'Which Way Home' offers a unique perspective on the issue, as seen through the eyes of children who undertake this perilous journey with remarkable courage and resourcefulness.

== Characters ==
- Kevin: A 13-year-old boy who is friends with Fito. He leaves Honduras after feeling uncared for by his stepfather.
- Fito: A thirteen-year-old boy trying to find work in America. He leaves his hometown in Honduras with Kevin, also hoping to find a better life away from his grandmother and absent mother.
- Yuriko ("El Perro"): A seventeen-year-old boy, who leaves Chiapas, Mexico in hopes of finding a family that will adopt him in the US. Having no family, he lives on the streets begging in Chiapas and strikes up a close friendship with Fito on the journey to the border. He struggles with an addiction to huffing glue.
- Juan Carlos: A thirteen-year-old boy from Guatemala who leaves his mother to try and find work in America. He is abandoned by his father, and attempts to reach New York, where his father went.
- Olga and Freddy: Two friends on a journey to cross the border to find their family. Olga travels to Minnesota to find her mother while Freddy travels to Illinois to find his father. They were both ages nine years old traveling from Honduras to the US.

== Reception ==
=== Critical response ===
Which Way Home has an approval rating of 100% on review aggregator website Rotten Tomatoes, based on 8 reviews, and an average rating of 7.79/10.

=== Awards and nominations ===
==== Won ====
- Emmy, 2010 - Outstanding Informational Programming-Long Form

==== Nominated ====
- Academy Award 2010 - Best Documentary Feature
- Spirit Award 2010 - Best Documentary

== Soundtrack ==
An excerpt from the soundtrack (heard at 0:07:10 and again at 1:06:00) by James Lavino has been adopted by the Turner Classic Movies network to accompany the introduction trailer to feature film presentations in 2016.
