= Waste Services Inc. =

Canadian waste management company

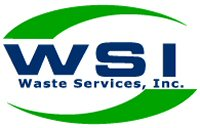
- Industry: Solid Waste Services
- Predecessor: Capital Waste Services
- Founded: 2001; 25 years ago
- Defunct: June 30, 2010
- Fate: Merged With BFI Canada
- Successor: BFI Canada (operated by Progressive Waste Solutions since 2000)
- Headquarters: Burlington, Ontario, Canada
- Area served: Canada and the United States

Waste Services Incorporated (WSI) was a Canadian company founded in 2001 that provided waste management services in Canada and the United States. It was headquartered in Burlington, Ontario. The company operated from 2001 until 2010 when it was merged into BFI Canada.

== History ==
The WSI brand is a company dealing with solid waste collection in Canada. The company predecessor was Capital Waste Services it was slowly absorbed into WSI just after the foundation of the company in 2001. The company has an enormous fleet of trucks in Canada and the U.S., the trucks are mostly front loader with some rear loaders and side loaders (mostly Labrie Expert 2000's). Today the company's website is still up but the company is defunct after merging in 2010.

=== Merger ===
On June 30, 2010 the company agreed to merge into BFI Canada. Three weeks later, the company began rebranding as BFI Canada, and the company was dissolved in Canada three months later. In the U.S., however, the company was rebranded as Progressive Waste Solutions because the BFI Canada brand name is still in use in the U.S. following its 2000 acquisition by Progressive Waste Solutions.
