= Woodpecker (2008 film) =

- Directed by: Alex Karpovsky
- Starring: Jon Hyrns
- Music by: James Lavino
- Release date: 2008

Woodpecker is a 2008 American comedy film directed by Alex Karpovsky and starring Jon Hyrns. The film follows Hyrns and his cohort, Wesley Yang, as they obsessively search the Arkansas bayou for proof that ivory-billed woodpecker is in fact not extinct.

Woodpecker is filmed in a docufiction style, set in the small Arkansas town of Brinkley. It incorporates faux-interviews with Brinkley residents recounting their experiences with the mysterious bird.

Hyrns becomes increasingly erratic and comic in his attempts to locate the animal.

== Soundtrack ==
The film’s soundtrack received positive reviews. The score, composed by James Lavino, was performed by Radiohead bassist Colin Greenwood and Lee and Tyler Sargent of Clap Your Hands Say Yeah.
