= God Is the Bigger Elvis =

- Directed by: Rebecca Cammisa
- Produced by: Julie Anderson; Rebecca Cammisa
- Starring: Dolores Hart
- Cinematography: Claudia Raschke-Robinson
- Edited by: Geeta Gandbhir
- Music by: James Lavino
- Distributed by: HBO
- Release date: April 5, 2012 (HBO)
- Running time: 37 minutes
- Country: United States
- Language: English

God Is the Bigger Elvis is a 2012 documentary film about actress Dolores Hart, who abandoned her successful career at the age of 24 to become a Benedictine nun. The film was nominated for the 2012 Academy Award for Best Documentary (Short Subject).

In 1957, Dolores Hart co-starred with Elvis Presley in the Paramount motion picture Loving You. It was in this film that she kissed Elvis. This was Elvis' very first on-screen kiss in a movie. Dolores and Elvis would reunite the following year in Michael Curtiz's King Creole.

== Awards ==
| Award | Category | Recipient | Result |
|---|---|---|---|
| 84th Academy Awards | Academy Award for Best Documentary (Short Subject) | Julie Anderson, Rebecca Cammisa | Nominated |
