= West Lake Landfill =

EPA superfund site in Missouri, US

- Superfund site
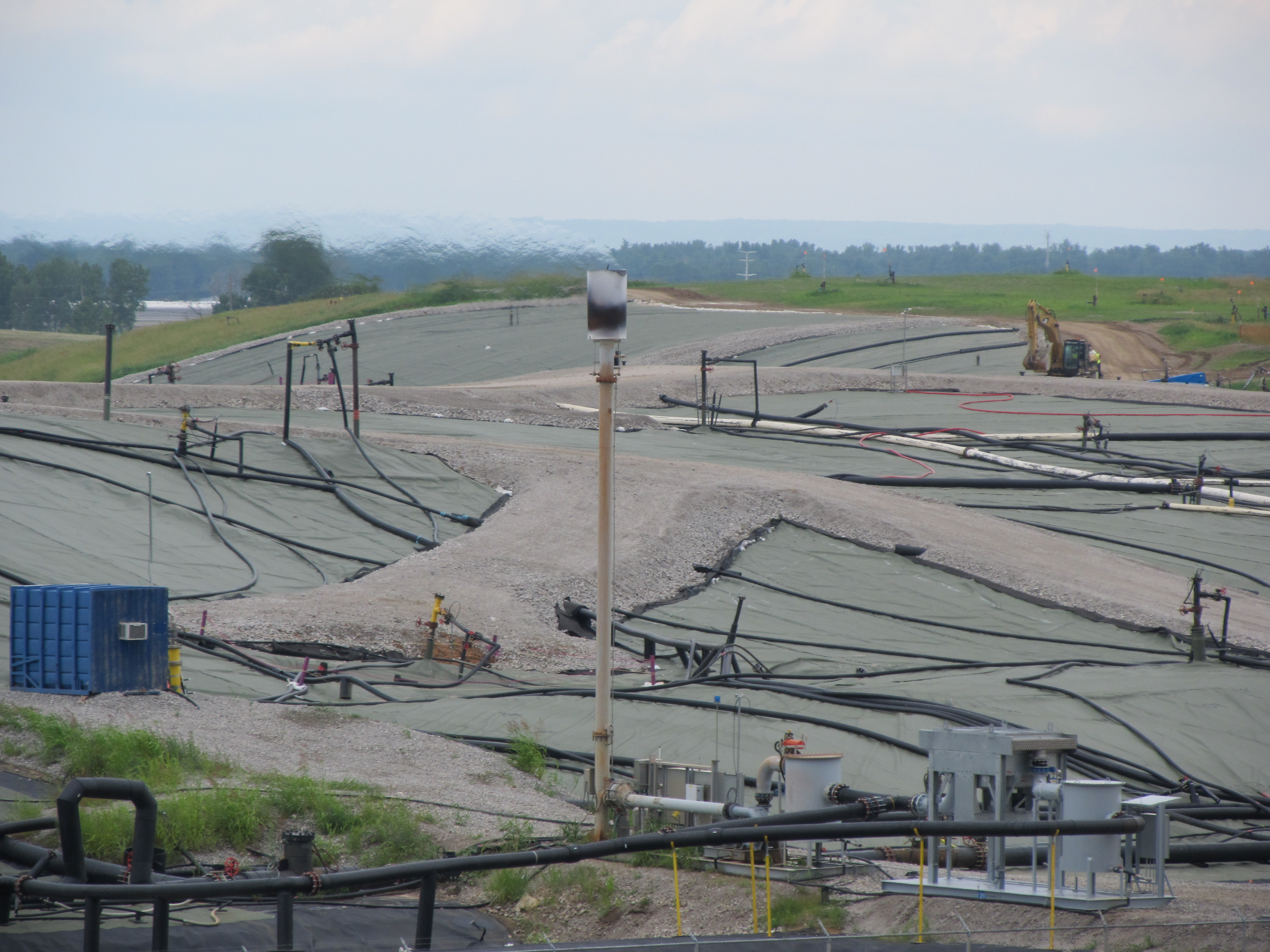
- The West Lake Landfill in July, 2014

- Location within Missouri
- Location: Bridgeton, St. Louis County, Missouri; 38°45′57.59″N 90°26′38.42″W

Information
- CERCLIS ID: MOD079900932

Progress
- Proposed: October 28, 1989
- Listed: August 30, 1990

West Lake Landfill is a closed, unlined mixed-waste landfill located in Bridgeton, Missouri. It was featured in the 2015 documentaries The First Secret City and The Safe Side of the Fence, and the 2017 HBO documentary Atomic Homefront. Its contents have been shown to include radioactive waste; it is thus also an EPA Superfund cleanup site.

== History ==
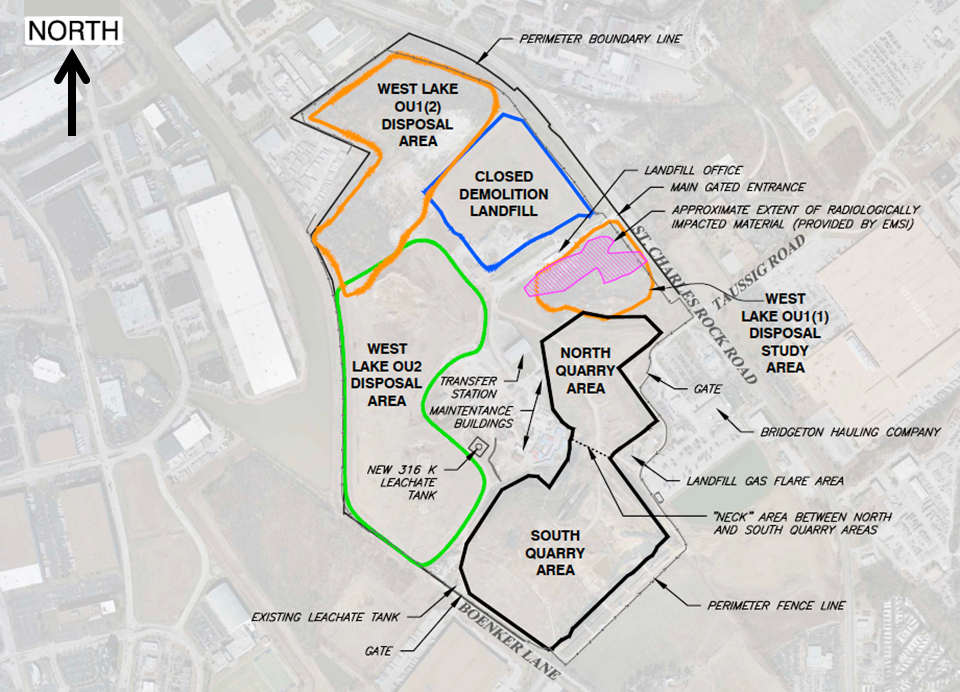
Aerial outline of West Lake Landfill

The West Lake Landfill site originated in 1939 as a limestone quarry operated by the Westlake Quarry Company. Landfilling at the site began in the early 1950s.

In 1973, after having changed hands (and responsible oversight) several times, B&K Construction Co., a company contracted by Cotter Corporation, dumped a portion of the original stored radioactive material at a nearby storage facility. 8,700 short tons (7,900 tonnes) of leached barium sulfate, the material with the lowest relative radioactivity, was combined with 39,000 short tons (35,000 t) of topsoil to dilute the contaminated material at the landfill. The leached barium sulfate was a byproduct of Mallinckrodt Chemical Works’ uranium enrichment program as a part of the Manhattan Project and later nuclear weapons production, and dumping it there was illegal. Due to the discovery of the radioactive and other contaminants at the site, West Lake was proposed as a Superfund site in October 1989 and was officially listed as such a site in August 1990.

The Nuclear Regulatory Commission discovered the disposal and investigated the site, publishing a report in 1977.

West Lake was proposed to be a Superfund site on October 28, 1989, and the EPA placed the landfill on the National Priorities List, designating it as a Superfund site on August 30, 1990. The EPA has listed four potentially responsible parties: the US Department of Energy; the Cotter Corporation; and Republic Services subsidiaries Bridgeton Landfill and Rock Road Industries. The EPA directed those parties to undertake investigations and evaluations consistent with CERCLA (Superfund) guidance.

After decades of investigation, including multiple studies, public meetings, and public comment periods, the EPA selected a final site cleanup plan. In 2008, the EPA announced that they would contain the contaminated sites by placing a multilayered cover over 40 acres (16 ha) of the OU-1 Disposal Area. The EPA plan also required institutional controls and monitoring of the site. After receiving additional comments from environmental groups and the general public, the EPA asked the potentially responsible parties to commission a study of alternative cleanup options. The resulting supplemental feasibility study was released in 2011.

In 2012, following consultation with the EPA National Remedy Review Board, the EPA asked the potentially responsible parties to gather more data and perform additional evaluations. After conducting an aerial survey of the site and surrounding areas in 2013, the EPA reported that the radioactive waste remained contained within OU-1 and posed no safety risk to outlying areas.

The West Lake landfill has drawn further scrutiny because of a nearby subsurface smoldering fire (in the OU-2 Disposal Area), an event located only 1,000 feet (300 m) away from OU-1. If the fire were to reach the OU-1 area of radioactive waste, the radiation risks are low.

In February 2018, EPA head Scott Pruitt announced a proposed plan to remediate the West Lake Landfill. Known as “Excavation Plus” or “Alternative 4,” the plan involved removing radioactively impacted material with a concentration greater than 52.9 picocuries per gram (pCi/g), to a maximum depth of 16 feet. The proposal would remove approximately 67 percent of the radioactivity from the landfill and take 5 years to implement at an estimated cost of $236 million. Potentially responsible parties, including Bridgeton Landfill LLC, Rock Road Industries Inc., Cotter Corporation, and the Department of Energy are liable for the costs of the clean-up. Included in the plan is a proposal to build a cover system which will protect the community of Bridgeton for the long term.

== Current management ==
The landfill is divided into multiple sectors, within which are two operable units (OU), OU-1 and OU-2. OU-1 contains radioactive material; OU-2 has been shown to as well. OU-1 covers 940 cubic yards (720 m^{3}) on the surface (based on soil depth of 6 inches or 150 millimeters) and 24,000 cubic yards (18,000 m^{3}) subsurface, while OU-2 covers 8,700 cubic yards (6,700 m^{3}) on the surface and 109,000 cubic yards (83,000 m^{3}) subsurface.

The U.S. Environmental Protection Agency (EPA) currently holds control over the West Lake Landfill. The EPA has commissioned multiple studies and reports detailing the history, status and proposed remedies of OU-1.

In April 2000, the EPA released a report, "Remedial Investigation Report West Lake Landfill Operable Unit 1," which detailed the history and condition of the site. The EPA released a feasibility study on OU-1 in May 2006, which evaluated possible remedial options for OU-1. The study contains a chapter detailing the site’s condition as of 2006.

After these and other thorough investigations, the EPA signed a Record of Decision (ROD) for OU-1. In May 2008, the EPA released its record of decision, which outlined the designated course of action for remediation, including designation of a capping system designed to contain hazardous areas, and plans for long-term monitoring of ground water. In particular, it detailed the EPA’s proposed remedy of a multilayer landfill cover over the affected areas of OU-1. The EPA commissioned a supplemental feasibility study, which followed internal agency deliberations and consideration of comments provided by interested community members.

== Status 2010-present ==
=== Studies ===
The EPA continued to receive feedback regarding the Record of Decision (ROD), and in response required that potentially responsible parties conduct a Supplemental Feasibility Study (SFS) for OU-1. The full SFS was released to the public in December 2011

The current milestones and timeline from the FDA includes:

- May–June 2015, initiation of gamma cone penetration testing and sonic core sampling to characterize extent of radiologically impacted material, and with fall 2015 suspense.
- June 2015, completion of one year of baseline off-site air monitoring data [to support eventual West Lake air monitoring conclusions].
- Late summer 2015, initiation of pyrolysis testing, to determine how radioactively impacted material is effected by elevated temperatures .
- 2016, suspense for site characterization and conceptual site model update completion, to inform the planned further Supplemental Feasibility Study (SFS), and suspense for SFS completion .
- 2017, public commenting period regarding the long term remedies proposed for West Lake, and EPA finalization of changes to the 2008 ROD.

=== Subsurface smoldering event ===
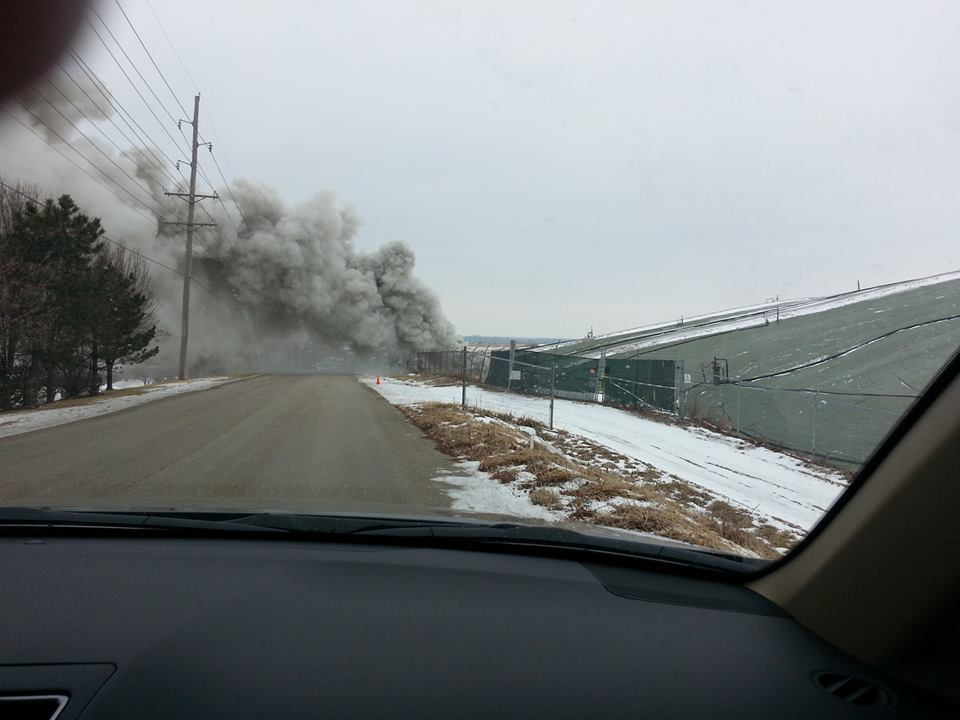
Surface fire at the West Lake Landfill, February 2014

In December 2010, those overseeing the adjoining OU-2 landfill area, the Bridgeton Sanitary Landfill "reported... experiencing elevated temperatures on some gas extraction wells" and concluded that a subsurface smoldering event (SSE) had begun. SSEs are a form of chemical combustion that occur deep within a landfill and produces no visible flame or quantity of smoke, unless they reach the surface, where oxygen is abundant. They usually last for several years.

In March 2013, high subsurface temperatures were measured at depths of over 150 feet (46 m) covering an area of approximately 20 acres (8.1 hectares). Trying to excavate such a large area to put out the reaction would be difficult, if not impossible, and would most likely increase toxic fumes and the risk of the reaction breaking through to the surface.

=== Isolation barrier ===
Since the discovery of the smoldering fire, Republic Services ordered an isolation barrier be built (September 2013), which will prevent smoldering sanitary waste from reaching the radioactive waste stored in OU-1.

The EPA, working in conjunction with the Missouri Department of Natural Resources, the US Army Corps of Engineers and others, announced a decision in December, 2015, to install a physical isolation barrier for the West Lake Landfill Superfund Site. The plan recommends the installation of other engineering controls, including cooling loops, to prevent any potential impacts in the likely event that the subsurface smoldering event came in contact with the radioactive materials on the site.

Further, landfill owners plan to install a cap over the North Quarry, create trenches to capture liquid and gas underneath the cap, in addition to improving techniques used to monitor gas.

== Associated risks ==
There is some radioactive waste in the West Lake Landfill. An independent evaluation by Agency for Toxic Substances and Disease Registry in 2015 concluded that it does not pose a health risk to the surrounding communities. The amount of radon gas was well below the level that causes lung cancer, groundwater near the landfill moves away from the surrounding communities and is not used for drinking water, and soil samples showed no evidence of radioactive contamination.

== Future management ==
In mid-2016 there was a movement for control of the West Lake landfill to be shifted to the Formerly Utilized Sites Remedial Action Program (FUSRAP), administered by the United States Army Corps of Engineers. FUSRAP was established in 1974 to clean up radioactive wastes resulting from early nuclear activity of the US Atomic Energy Commission. FUSRAP uses independent government scientists to conduct site studies and evaluations. After thorough evaluations are conducted, the US Army Corps of Engineers (USACE) determines how to manage the radioactive waste. Fiscally responsible parties are not able to legally challenge this decision. FUSRAP currently controls two on-going remediation projects within the greater St. Louis metropolitan area, the St. Louis Airport Site (SLAPS) and the Hazelwood Interim Storage Site (HISS), both of which contain the same composition of radioactive waste as the West Lake Landfill.

According to Steven Stockton, the corps' director of civil works, adding West Lake to the FUSRAP would not speed up remediation. In addition, key US congressional energy committee members, along with the US Army Corps of Engineers oppose a proposal by Missouri's delegation to move the landfill's oversight from the EPA Superfund to FUSRAP.

== See also ==
- Hanford site
- Radioactive contamination
