= Bridgeton, Missouri =

City in St. Louis County, Missouri, United States

- City
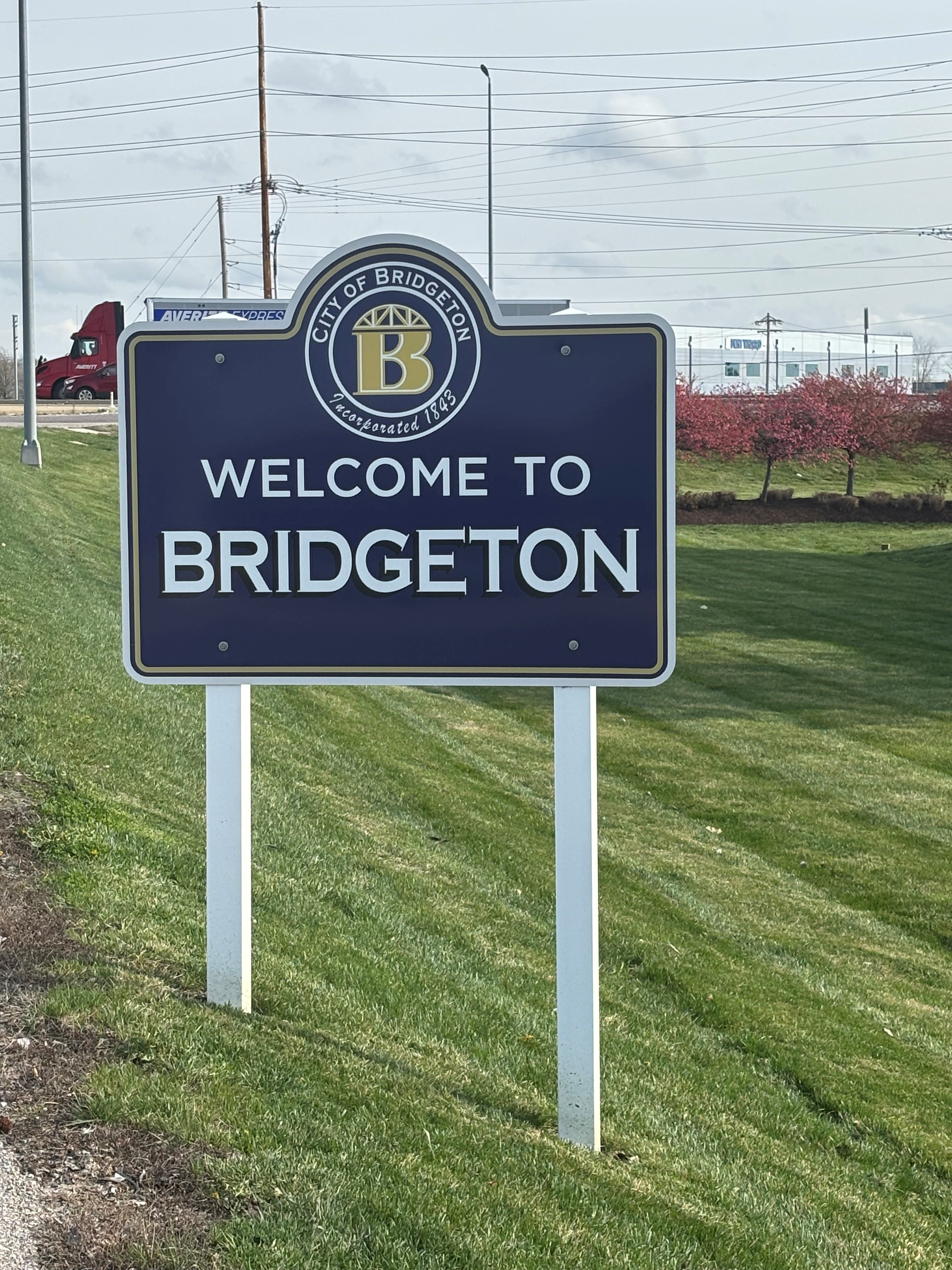
- Welcome to Bridgeton, 2025

- Seal

- Location of Bridgeton, Missouri
- Coordinates: 38°45′26″N 90°25′4″W
- Country: United States
- State: Missouri
- County: St. Louis
- Townships: Northwest, Airport
- Incorporated: 1843

Government
  - Mayor: Randy Hein

Area
  - Total: 34.75 sq mi (90.00 km^{2})
  - Land: 14.55 sq mi (37.69 km^{2})
  - Water: 0.68 sq mi (1.77 km^{2})
- Elevation: 541 ft (165 m)

Population (2020)
  - Total: 11,445
  - Density: 786.4/sq mi (303.65/km^{2})
- Time zone: UTC-6 (Central (CST))
  - Summer (DST): UTC-5 (CDT)
- ZIP code: 63044
- Area codes: 314/557
- FIPS code: 29-08398
- GNIS feature ID: 2393417
- Website: www.bridgetonmo.com

Bridgeton is a second-ring suburb of Greater St. Louis in northwestern St. Louis County, Missouri, United States. Bridgeton is located at the intersection of the St. Louis outer belt and I-70. Bridgeton serves as the primary transport hub within Greater St. Louis. The population at the 2020 census was 11,445. Portions of St. Louis Lambert International Airport are within Bridgeton. The town is featured in the documentary Atomic Homefront, which covers the effects of radioactive waste stored in the nearby West Lake Landfill site.

== Location ==
The populated areas of the city are located between Lambert-St. Louis International Airport and St. Charles. The Missouri River serves as the city's northwestern boundary. Bridgeton is centered at 38°45'26" North, 90°25'4" West (38.7573, -90.4179).

The area has long been influenced by its proximity to important local transportation routes, dating back to Native American trails established by the Osage Nation. Many of those trails became the basis of the first roads in the area, such as Natural Bridge and the historic St. Charles Rock Road, which date back to the days of Spanish, French, and early American settlement. The intersection of I-70 and I-270 in this area add to air and rail access to make the area a good base for transportation-dependent industries. The recreational American Discovery Trail passes through the area.

According to the United States Census Bureau, the city has a total area of 15.24 square miles (39.47 km^{2}), of which 14.60 square miles (37.81 km^{2}) is land and 0.64 square miles (1.66 km^{2}) is water.

== History ==
=== Early history ===
The first Europeans to interact with Native American peoples and settle there were associated with the area's days as part of the French Illinois Territory. The French explorer, Étienne de Veniard de Bourgmont traveled the area in 1724, on a trail that developed as the main route between St. Louis and St. Charles.

The Spanish gained colonial control in 1768 after France was defeated by Great Britain in the Seven Years' War and ceded its territory west of the Mississippi to Spain; they remained in control until 1804, when the area was transferred to the Americans in the Louisiana Purchase. In a 1799 census, the population of "Marais des Liards" was given as 337 whites and 42 slaves.

Bridgeton was first platted in 1794, and named Marais des Liards (Cottonwood Swamp). It was also known as Village à Robert, named after Robert Owen, its founder, who had received a land grant from the Spanish government. In a Spanish census two years later it had a population (including slaves) of 77 males and 47 females. As the area received more and more English-speaking settlers, the village's name became Owen's Station.

Because of its location, including its proximity to a ferry across the Missouri River, Bridgeton became a stop along the way from St. Louis to St. Charles. Meriwether Lewis passed through on his way to meet members who were gathering as part of the Lewis and Clark Expedition. The city was granted a state charter in 1843; throughout the next few years it was a stop along the way for emigrants seeking the major trailheads to the Oregon and Santa Fe trails.

The Jesuits, a Catholic religious order of priests and brothers, came to Bridgeton from St. Stanislaus Seminary and St. Ferdinand Parish of Florissant, Missouri. The order established St. Mary's Church in 1851 as a mission to serve area Catholics; it became a full parish within its first year. The Archdiocese of St. Louis suppressed the parish in 2001 due to the expansion of Lambert-St. Louis International Airport, which caused a decline in residential population.

=== Modern history ===
By 1950, Bridgeton's population was 276, lower than it had been in the late 1790s and early 19th century. The city expanded in size during the decade, growing through annexation, to 16 square miles (41 km^{2}). The decade included the founding of the Northwest Chamber of Commerce, the chamber of commerce for the Northwest St. Louis area, which includes Bridgeton.

This led into its period of greatest residential growth, the 1960s, during which nearly 8000 single-family homes were built. Denser development was strong during that decade as well, at nearly 2000 units. Unlike with single-family development, the multi-family development continued at about the same average pace during the 1970s and 1980s.

In 1968, the city bought the Payne-Gentry House, the oldest home in Bridgeton, from the heirs of the Payne Gentry family and built Gentry Park around the home. The home was later put on the National Register of Historic Places and contains the oldest surviving doctor's office in Missouri.

While residential construction nearly ended in the 1990s, that decade had seen significant growth in commercial development. Levee-protected floodplains of the river, together with good access to interstate highways, rail, and the airport have translated into continued growth for Bridgeton and nearby communities, and a diversification of the city's tax base. Proximity to Lambert-Saint Louis International Airport proved to be a mixed blessing. Starting in 1995, an expansion plan for the airport, centered on a new runway plan called W-1W, was fought (unsuccessfully) by the city. The new runway led to the elimination of 2000 homes in the city, most notably in the Carrollton subdivision, undoubtedly playing a significant role in the city's recent population decline.

=== 2011 tornado ===
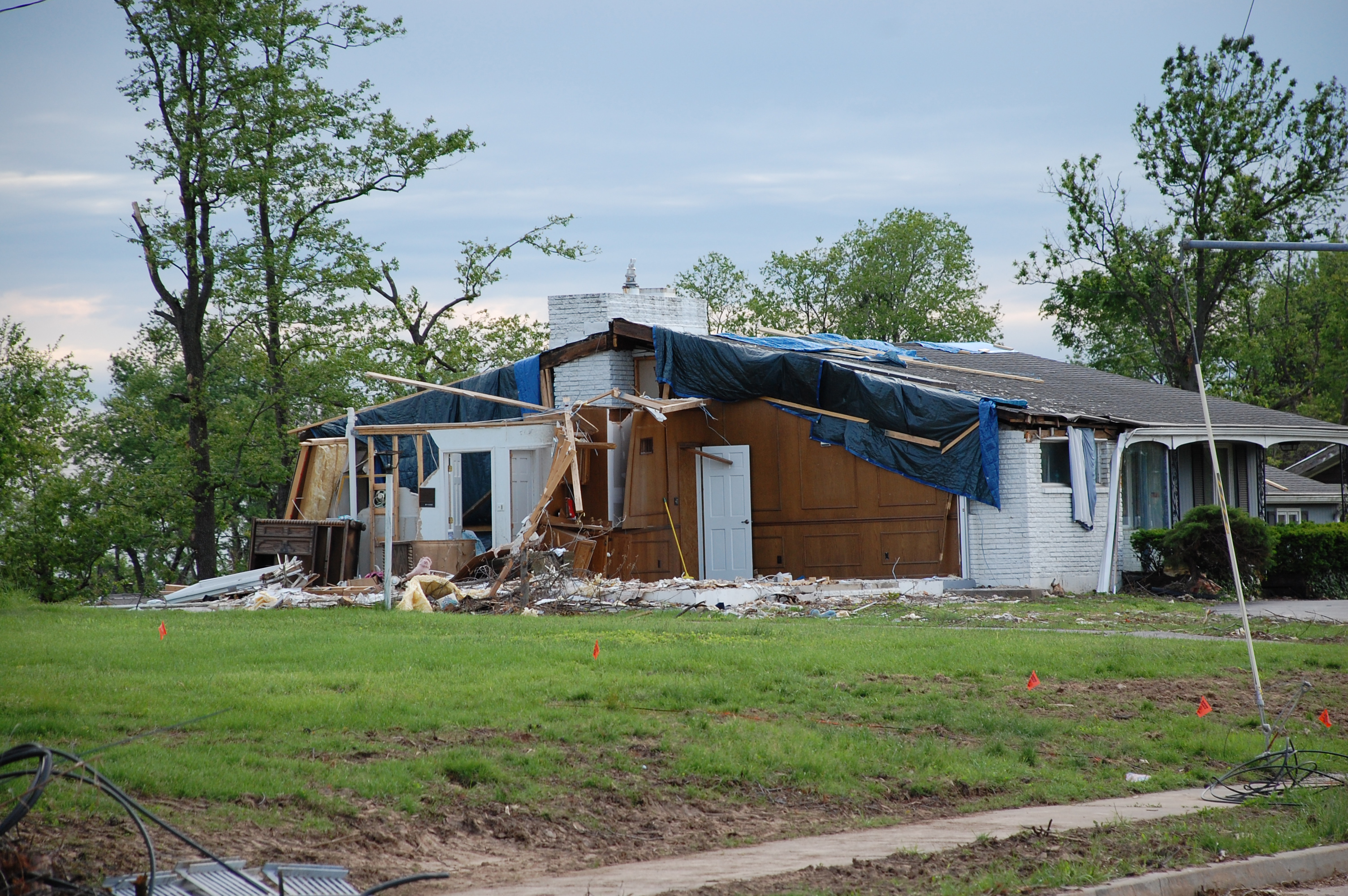
Home damaged by the tornado.

On Good Friday, April 22, 2011, a violent tornado, rated EF4 on the Enhanced Fujita scale, struck the area and impacted many neighborhoods within Bridgeton but also other suburbs of the St. Louis metropolitan area, including Maryland Heights. In Bridgeton, the tornado was especially at its strongest, as one house along Old St. Charles Road was completely leveled by estimated 170 mph (270 km/h) winds. St. Louis Lambert International Airport was also affected by the tornado. Despite the impact, the tornado only injured five people whilst no deaths were reported. The tornado was the strongest to affect the St. Louis area since January 24, 1967.

== Demographics ==
=== Racial and ethnic composition ===
Bridgeton city, Missouri – Racial and ethnic composition Note: the US Census treats Hispanic/Latino as an ethnic category. This table excludes Latinos from the racial categories and assigns them to a separate category. Hispanics/Latinos may be of any race.
Race / Ethnicity (NH = Non-Hispanic)	Pop 2000	Pop 2010	Pop 2020	% 2000	% 2010	% 2020
White alone (NH)	13,211	8,130	6,753	84.96%	70.39%	59.00%
Black or African American alone (NH)	1,407	2,141	2,781	9.05%	18.54%	24.30%
Native American or Alaska Native alone (NH)	30	20	17	0.19%	0.17%	0.15%
Asian alone (NH)	353	288	368	2.27%	2.49%	3.22%
Native Hawaiian or Pacific Islander alone (NH)	1	2	3	0.01%	0.02%	0.03%
Other race alone (NH)	20	19	46	0.13%	0.16%	0.40%
Mixed race or Multiracial (NH)	183	207	577	1.18%	1.79%	5.04%
Hispanic or Latino (any race)	345	743	900	2.22%	6.43%	7.86%
Total	15,550	11,550	11,445	100.00%	100.00%	100.00%

Historical population
Census	Pop.	Note	%±
1880	197		—
1890	237		20.3%
1900	178		−24.9%
1910	129		−27.5%
1920	121		−6.2%
1930	152		25.6%
1940	169		11.2%
1950	202		19.5%
1960	7,820		3,771.3%
1970	19,992		155.7%
1980	18,445		−7.7%
1990	17,779		−3.6%
2000	15,550		−12.5%
2010	11,550		−25.7%
2020	11,445		−0.9%
U.S. Decennial Census

=== 2020 census ===
As of the 2020 census, Bridgeton had a population of 11,445, with 4,595 households and 3,024 families. The population density was 786.6 per square mile (303.7/km^{2}).

The median age was 41.5 years. 22.4% of residents were under the age of 18 and 21.2% of residents were 65 years of age or older. For every 100 females there were 88.7 males, and for every 100 females age 18 and over there were 84.2 males age 18 and over.

99.9% of residents lived in urban areas, while 0.1% lived in rural areas.

Of the 4,595 households, 29.3% had children under the age of 18 living in them. Of all households, 41.9% were married-couple households, 17.5% were households with a male householder and no spouse or partner present, and 33.9% were households with a female householder and no spouse or partner present. About 30.9% of all households were made up of individuals and 17.0% had someone living alone who was 65 years of age or older. The average household size was 2.6 and the average family size was 3.0.

There were 5,088 housing units, of which 9.7% were vacant. The homeowner vacancy rate was 1.4% and the rental vacancy rate was 9.6%.

=== Income and poverty ===
The 2016–2020 5-year American Community Survey estimates show that the median household income was $61,207 (with a margin of error of +/- $7,813) and the median family income was $73,370 (+/- $15,757). Males had a median income of $38,158 (+/- $4,775) versus $32,050 (+/- $3,234) for females. The median income for those above 16 years old was $34,132 (+/- $3,720). Approximately, 4.9% of families and 10.3% of the population were below the poverty line, including 18.0% of those under the age of 18 and 5.0% of those ages 65 or over.

=== 2010 census ===
As of the census of 2010, there were 11,550 people, 4,760 households, and 2,957 families residing in the city. The population density was 791.1 inhabitants per square mile (305.4/km^{2}). There were 5,088 housing units at an average density of 348.5 per square mile (134.6/km^{2}). The racial makeup of the city was 72.4% White, 18.7% African American, 0.2% Native American, 2.5% Asian, 4.1% from other races, and 2.1% from two or more races. Hispanic or Latino of any race were 6.4% of the population.

There were 4,760 households, of which 28.0% had children under the age of 18 living with them, 43.8% were married couples living together, 13.3% had a female householder with no husband present, 5.0% had a male householder with no wife present, and 37.9% were non-families. 32.3% of all households were made up of individuals, and 15.6% had someone living alone who was 65 years of age or older. The average household size was 2.33 and the average family size was 2.94.

The median age in the city was 44.6 years. 19.9% of residents were under the age of 18; 8.1% were between the ages of 18 and 24; 22.5% were from 25 to 44; 29.2% were from 45 to 64; and 20.2% were 65 years of age or older. The gender makeup of the city was 47.0% male and 53.0% female.

=== 2000 census ===
In 2000, the city included 6,251 households and 4,206 families. The population density was 1,067.1 inhabitants per square mile (412.0/km^{2}). There were 6,729 housing units at an average density of 461.8 per square mile (178.3/km^{2}). The racial makeup of the city was 86.47% White, 9.05% African American, 2.27% Asian, 0.01% Pacific Islander, 0.21% Native American, 0.69% from other races, and 1.30% from two or more races. 2.22% of the population were Hispanic or Latino of any race.

There were 6,251 households in the city, with an average of 2.43 members. Of these households:

- 27.9% had children under the age of 18,
- 52.3% were married couples co-habitating,
- 11.3% had a female householder with no husband present, and
- 32.7% were not family-based.

26.8% of all households were made up of individuals, and 9.8% had someone living alone who was 65 years of age or older. The average household size was 2.43, and the average family size was 2.95.

The median age of the city's residents was 40 years, distributed as follows:

- 22.1% under the age of 18,
- 8.0% from 18 to 24,
- 27.9% from 25 to 44,
- 26.4% from 45 to 64, and
- 15.7% who were 65 years of age or older.

For every 100 females, there were 93.6 males. For every 100 females age 18 and over, there were 89.7 males.

At the 2000 census, the median income for a household in the city was $49,216. Males had a median income of $41,250 versus $28,175 for females. The per-capita income for the city was $23,955. 4.9% of the population and 3.2% of families lived below the poverty line. Out of the total population, 4.7% were under 18 and 6.4% of those 65 and older were living below the poverty line.

== Economy ==
Trans States subsidiary GoJet Airlines is headquartered in Bridgeton.

SSM DePaul Health Center, is located in Bridgeton. It is a 476-bed, full-service, Catholic hospital and a member of SSM Health Care-St. Louis, sponsored by the Franciscan Sisters of Mary. Opened in 1828, SSM DePaul was the first hospital west of the Mississippi River and remains one of the oldest continuously existing businesses in St. Louis.

== Education ==
Much of the city is served by the Pattonville School District. Some parts are in the Hazelwood School District. Small pieces are in Ritenour School District and Ferguson-Florissant R-II School District.

St. Louis County Library operates the Bridgeton Trails Branch in Bridgeton.

== Notable people ==
- Josh Fleming (born 1996), baseball player for the Pittsburgh Pirates
- Janet Jones (born 1961), actress; wife of National Hockey League legend Wayne Gretzky
- Eric Schmitt (born 1975), U.S. senator for Missouri

== See also ==
- List of cities in Missouri
