= Jon Vander Ark =

American business executive

Jon Vander Ark (born 1975) is an American business executive. He has been the president and CEO of Republic Services since June 26, 2021. Before taking over as president, Vander Ark was chief operating officer since January 1, 2018. He joined the company in 2013 as executive vice president-chief marketing officer. He has a BA from Calvin College, and a JD from Harvard Law School. He was previously a partner at McKinsey & Co. Inc. Vander Ark co-authored Sales Growth: Five Proven Strategies from the World’s Sales Leaders, published in 2012.
