= Allied Waste Industries =

American waste management company

Allied Waste Industries, Inc
- Type: Public
- Traded as: NYSE: AW
- Industry: Waste & Disposal Services
- Founded: 1988; 38 years ago
- Defunct: 2008
- Fate: Merged Into Republic Services
- Successor: Republic Services
- Headquarters: Phoenix, Arizona, U.S.
- Key people: Bruce Lessey (Founder and former CFO), Roger Ramsey (former CEO), John J. Zillmer (former CEO), Thomas H. Van Weelden (former CEO)
- Revenue: US$6,230,000,000 (2007)
- Net income: US$273,000,000 (2007)
- Number of employees: 22,800
- Website: web.archive.org/web/20021201134806/http://phx.corporate-ir.net/phoenix.zhtml?c=74587&p=IROL-index

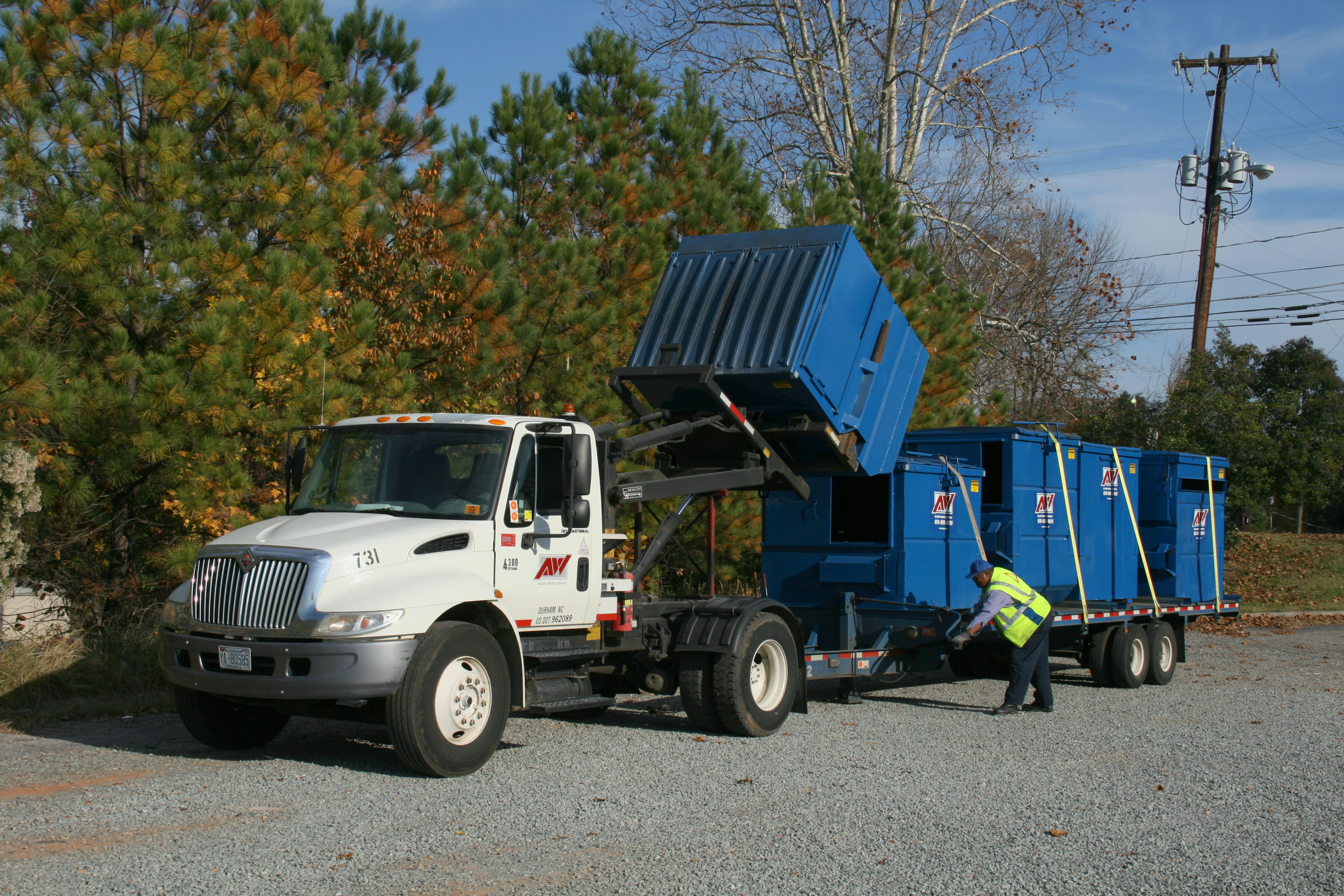
An Allied Waste dumpster transporter truck

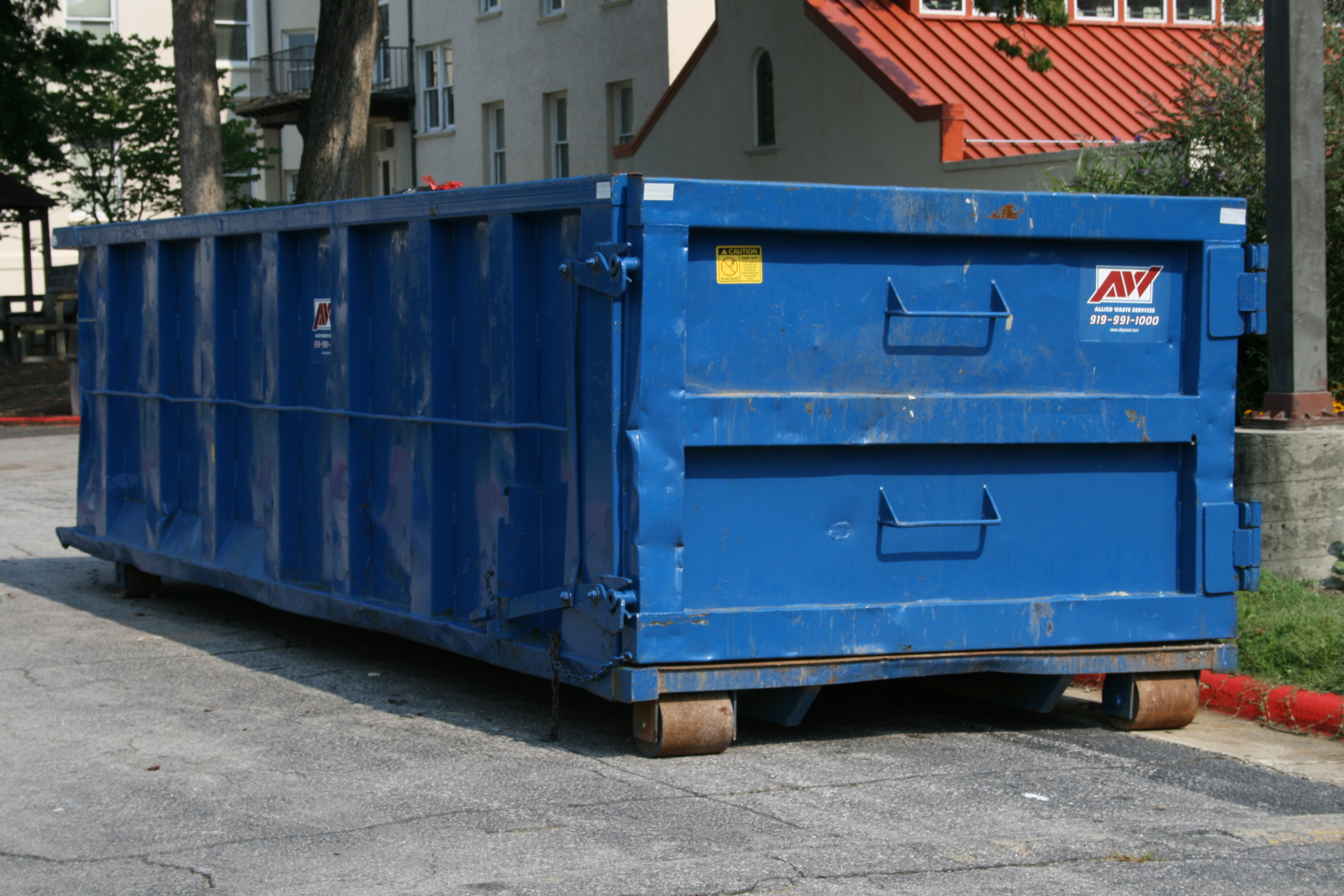
An Allied Waste rolloff container at a school in Durham, North Carolina

Allied Waste Industries, Inc. was a Fortune 500 company headquartered in Phoenix, Arizona. A vertically integrated company that owned and operated solid waste collection businesses, recycling facilities, and landfills, it was a leader in the solid waste industry in the United States. It served more than 10 million residential, commercial and industrial customers across 128 major markets in 37 states and Puerto Rico.

After purchasing Houston-based giant waste hauler Browning-Ferris Industries (BFI) in 1999, together with private equity firms the Blackstone Group and Apollo Management, Allied Waste Industries, Inc. became the second largest non-hazardous solid waste management company in the United States (behind industry leader Waste Management, Inc.), with annual revenues of over $5 billion and assets of nearly $14 billion.

On June 23, 2008, Allied was purchased by its smaller competitor Republic Services, Inc for US$6.1 billion. The merged company, retaining the Republic name, has become the second largest non-hazardous solid waste management company in the United States.

== Environmental record ==
The company had a plan to reduce its local carbon footprint by more than 3.3 million pounds each year in San Mateo County, California, by converting its monthly 80,000 gallons of petroleum diesel to B20 bio-diesel fuel. Allied Waste converted the local 225-truck fleet to the cleaner-burning B20. Allied Waste was a member of the Leadership in Energy and Environmental Design (LEEDS) Program which is outlined by the U.S. Green Building Council. John J. Zillmer, chairman and chief executive officer of Allied Waste, said, "Allied Waste has long been an active steward of our environment...we aim to employ environmentally responsible and sustainable practices." Allied Waste also implemented innovations such as gas-to-energy projects. Gas-to-energy converts waste gas from landfills into electricity which offsets conventional use of oil and natural gas.
