= Atomic Homefront =

- Directed by: Rebecca Cammisa
- Cinematography: Claudia Raschke
- Edited by: Madeleine Gavin
- Music by: Robert Miller
- Release date: 2017
- Country: United States
- Language: English

Atomic Homefront is a 2017 documentary film about the effects of radioactive waste stored in West Lake Landfill in St. Louis County, Missouri. The film was made by Rebecca Cammisa and co-produced by James Freydberg and Larissa Bills.

The film was widely received at several national and international film festivals in 2017 and 2018. These included the Uranium Film Festival in Berlin, the D.C. Environmental Film Festival in Washington, D.C., the DocNYC Film Festival in New York City, and the St. Louis International Film Festival in St. Louis. The film won multiple awards, including the Robert F. Kennedy Award Journalism Award in 2019.

== Background and synopsis ==
The documentary discusses the history of St. Louis, Missouri as a uranium processing centre for the Manhattan Project that contributed to the creation of the atomic bomb. Spent or processed material containing radionuclides such as uranium, thorium, and radium were disposed of near city suburbs. Due to the city being situated on a flood plain, these elements diffused into the Coldwater Creek, and thus were leached into the surrounding land as well. This led to an unusually high incidence of rare cancers and congenital defects among the residing population, and mass discontent with the situation.

The film documents grassroots organisations such as Just Moms STL and Coldwater Creek – Just the Facts Please, and their efforts to educate their community and push for environmental justice.
