= Lori Riddle =

Lori Riddle (formerly Lori Thomas-Luna) is an Akimel O'odam Indian Tribe member who promotes environmental justice in Arizona. Riddle is the co-founder and director of the Gila River Alliance for a Clean Environment (GRACE), a group focused on environmental health and justice issues on the Gila River Indian Reservation, and serves on the board of Greenaction for Health and Environmental Justice. She is best known for her work regarding the Romic Environmental Technologies Corporation chemical treatment plant, the Stericycle medical waste incinerator and the Arizona Loop 202 freeway expansion.

== Early childhood ==
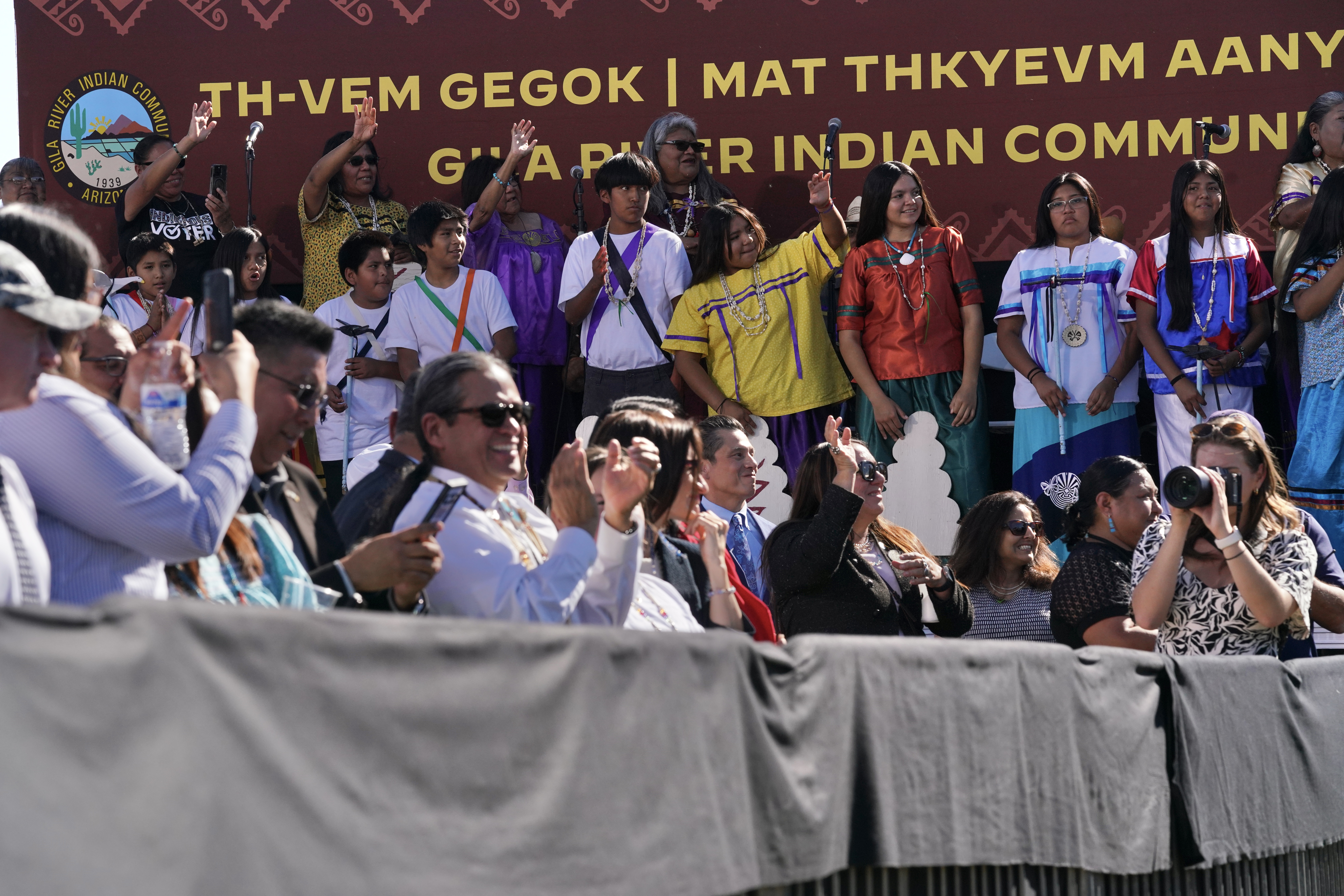
Gila River Indian Community gathering in 2024

Lori Riddle grew up on the Gila River Indian Community reservation in Arizona. The land her community used for agriculture had been a common pesticide dumping ground since the 1930s which brought inedible agriculture yield. She believes that this pesticide leaching has been causing the reoccurring illnesses and miscarriages present in her family generations. In addition, the community had a nearby industrial park operating a medical incinerator and hazardous waste treatment plant. Her community's exposure to toxic chemicals encouraged her to became an environmental activist.

== Career ==
Romic Southwest Environmental Technologies Corporation Chemical Plant

Bay Road Holdings LLC (formerly Romic Southwest Environmental Technologies Corporation) was a hazardous waste storage and treatment company that began operation in 1964. The treatment company worked with fuel blending, aerosol can processing, container crushing, wastewater treatment, solvent recycling, and hazardous waste storage and treatment. Romic owned and operated a facility in Lone Butte Industrial Park in Chandler, Arizona near the Gila River Indian Reservation. On April 5th 2005, a Romic operator made an incompatible mixture of hydrogen peroxide-bearing waste and inorganic acid in a facility tote that resulted in a flash fire, smoke and sounded the facilities' emergency alarm. After this initial reaction, the mixture was transferred into a tank that became over-pressurized sounding a second alarm. After both alarms, the remaining mixture left in the tote combined with unknown contents and released 40 gallons of hydrogen peroxide, a hazardous waste, into the atmosphere of the surrounding area including the Gila River Indian Reservation.

An official complaint was filed against Romic Southwest for the incident. In 2007 the U.S. Environmental Protection Agency found Romic Southwest in violation of environmental compliance. The complaint alleged that Romic failed to take the necessary steps to notify the National Response Center and any local coordinator after the release. In the report, the EPA claims that the release could have been prevented if Romic had been following the proper hazardous waste handling procedures. Romic Southwest Environmental Technologies Corporation was found to be in violation of the laws protecting its employees, the surrounding community and the environment. Romic was fined by the EPA for $67,888 for multiple hazardous waste violations. In substitute of the fine, the Gila River Indian Community and Romic made an agreement for the company to spend $100,800 on equipment for the Gila River Indian Community Fire Department and the Gila River Indian Community Department of Environmental Quality. With EPA involvement, the Romic Southwest Environmental Technologies Corporation was closed in 2007 and demolished in 2009.

Stericycle Medical Waste Incinerator

Stericycle, Inc is one of the largest medical waste treatment compliance companies in the United States of America. They specialize in pharmaceuticals, hazardous waste, medical waste and recalled and expired goods. Medical waste incineration is the process of burning waste produced by medical facilities like hospitals and research facilities. Incinerator plants burn this waste in order to sterilize it and reduce its volume for proper disposal. Medical waste companies including Stericycle have a history of opposition from nearby communities and environmentalists due to pollution and human health concerns. Large quantities of pollutants can be emitted to the atmosphere from these facilities causing air pollution concerns. These pollutants include metals, acid gases, oxides of nitrogen, particulate matter, carbon monoxide, organics and a variety of different materials present in medical waste like pathogens, cytotoxins and radioactive diagnostic materials. Most operating incinerators have little to no air pollution control devices which can be a concern for local communities. The U.S. Environmental Protection Agency ranks medical waste incinerators as the leading source of dioxin which is a known carcinogen and as the second highest source of mercury emissions.

Stericycle owned and operated a medical waste incinerator in the Lone Butte Industrial Park near the Gila River Indian Community in Arizona. On December 23rd, 1999 the operating incinerator had an emission release incident due to a loss of water where the facility entered bypass mode. In this state, pollution control equipment was inhibited and hazardous waste exited the incinerator directly into the atmosphere. This release occurred for four hours. As a result of this incident, the Gila River Indian Community's Department of Environmental Quality requested a health impact consultation from the U.S. Department of Health and Human Services. The consultation concluded that there was approximately 1.25μg/m3 of airborne mercury released from this incident. However, this amount was not enough to cause concern for human health. Lori Riddle formed GRACE, the Gila River Alliance for a Clean Environment, after health concerns about Stericycle were brought to her attention by members of Greenaction for Health and Environmental Justice. In the early 2000s, Greenaction for Health and Environmental Justice had experience with medical waste incinerators in California. They managed to shut down Oakland's Integrated Environmental Systems (IES) commercial medical waste incinerator. Greenaction joined forces with GRACE to protest Stericycle's medical waste incinerator in Arizona and another incinerator in Salt Lake City, Utah. In 2003 after a wake of human health and environmental justice protests by GRACE and Greenaction, the Stericycle, Inc facility closed its medical waste incinerator on the Gila River Indian Reservation. After these closures in California and Arizona, the Salt Lake City medical incinerator stayed in operation for 9 more years until its closure in 2022. The 33 year old incinerator closed after an accumulation of compliance issues with the Utah Department of Environmental Quality.

Arizona Loop 202 Expansion

The Arizona Loop 202 expansion was a freeway construction project conducted by the Arizona Department of Transportation to improve connections and decrease traffic congestion in downtown Phoenix. This project was started in 1985 and was reauthorized for 20 years in 2004 to complete the 202 South Mountain Freeway. The mapping of the highway runs along a section of the Gila River Indian Reservation and through a part of South Mountain, a mountain preserve in South Phoenix. The Loop 202 expansion proposed to damage a section of the preserve close to the community's reservation. In 2004, the construction was approved by voters in the Phoenix metropolitan area through Proposition 400.

Map of Arizona Freeway 202

Gila River Against Loop 202, a Gila River Indian Community and allies group, opposed the proposal of construction. South Mountain, where the Loop 202 expansion takes place, has sacred value to O'odam culture and Pee Posh people. In O'odam culture, South Mountain acts as the home of their creator which aids in the survival and identity of O'odam people. The mountain is important to several tribes in Arizona and is a central component of traditional stories and religious ceremonies. In addition, South Mountain, or Moahdak Do'ag, contains prehistoric petroglyphs created by the Hohokam, a Oasisameriaca tribe in southern Arizona up until 1450 A.D. Riddle feared that the expansion could cause environmental health risks to the Gila River Indian Community due to lingering dioxin emissions because of the parallel structure of the mountains where toxins could persist. In 2012, the Sierra Club listed the Loop 202 expansion in Arizona as one of the worse transportation projects in the U.S. because of its encouragement of carbon pollution from auto emissions. The Arizona Department of Transportation (ADOT) released a Draft Environmental Impact Statement (DEIS) in 2013 and a Final Environmental Impact Statement (FEIS) in 2014 covering the impact and environmental mitigation tactics for the Loop 202 expansion. Riddle along with the Gila River Alliance for a Clean Environment filed a federal Title VI Civil Rights Complaint against the ADOT claiming discrimination against the tribal community. The Record of Decision (ROD) for the project was issued in 2015, and construction started. The Arizona State Route 202 section of the Loop 202 was opened to the public in 2019.

== See also ==
- Akimel O'odham
- Greenaction for Health and Environmental Justice
- Gila River Indian Community
- Gila River Indian Reservation
- Environmental justice
- Arizona State Route 202
