= Ward Valley Anti-Nuclear Waste Campaign =

Anti-nuclear waste campaign

The Ward Valley Anti-Nuclear Waste Campaign was a campaign that sought to prevent the construction of a low-level radioactive waste storage facility in Ward Valley, California.

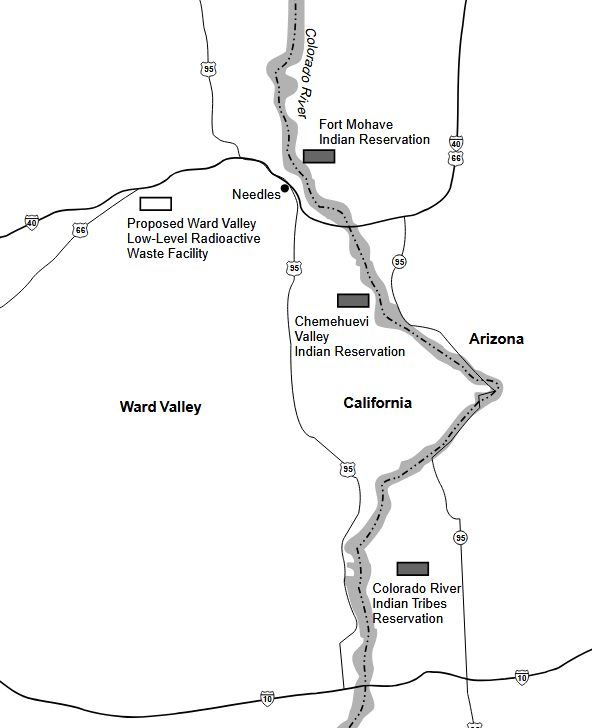
Map showing the proposed location of the Ward Valley nuclear waste disposal site.

== History ==
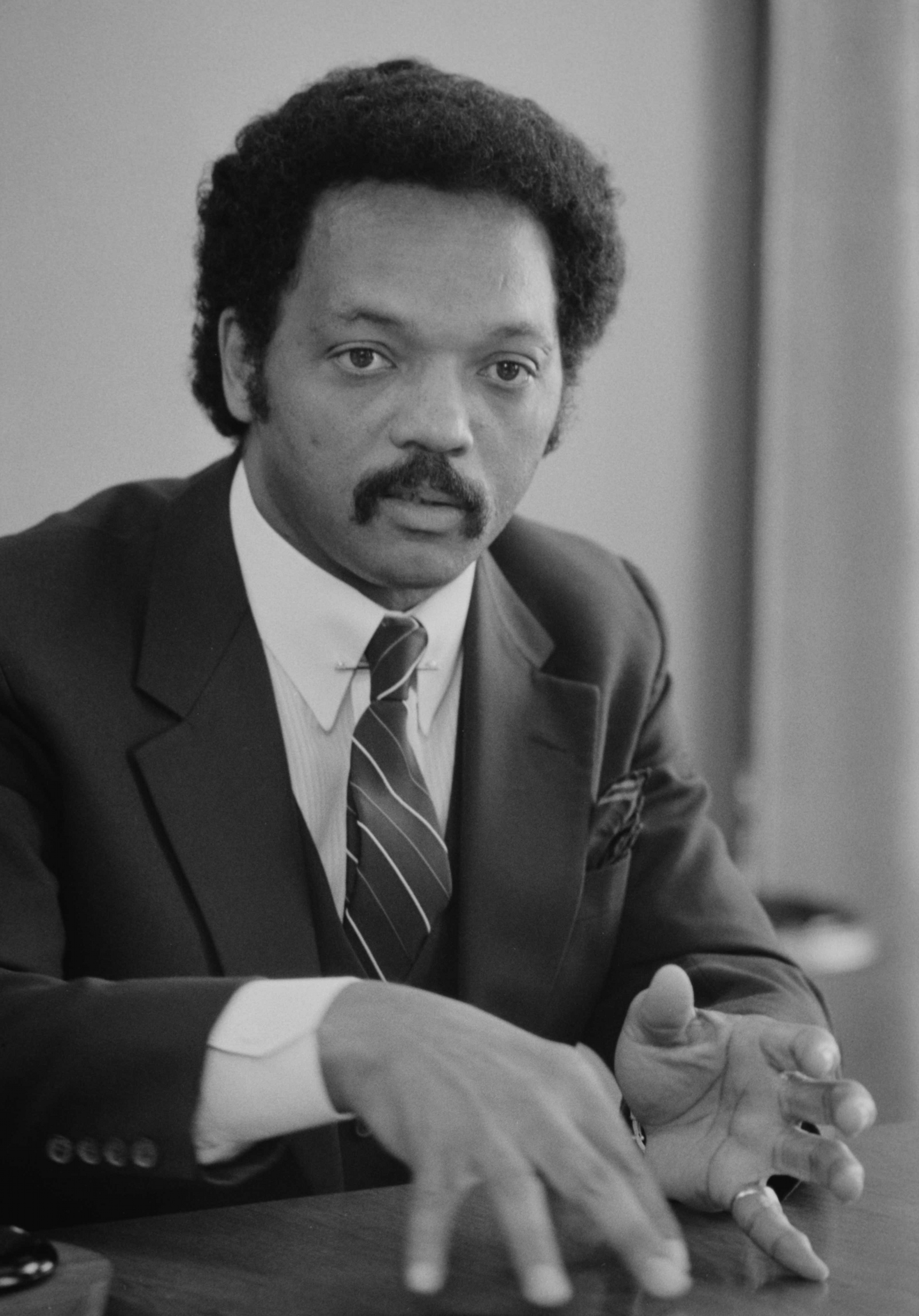
Jesse Jackson publicly opposed the Ward Valley nuclear waste landfill

The campaign started on July 8, 1995 with a group of activists known as the Colorado River Native Nations Alliance, an alliance of Native American tribes, joined by ecological organizations such as Greenpeace and the Bay Area Nuclear Waste Coalition protested the proposed creation of a low-level radioactive waste storage facility in southwest California.

The campaign began after US Ecology, Inc., a nuclear waste disposal company, petitioned the state of California for permission to use a portion of federal land owned by the US Bureau of Land Management in Ward Valley to operate a low-level nuclear waste facility. Environmental and native groups were concerned about the proximity of the Colorado River to the proposed site.

Ward Valley had been chosen among one of many locations beginning with California becoming a Nuclear Regulatory Commission "agreement state" in 1961. For “decades” Ward Valley had constantly faced dangers of becoming a disposal site for nuclear waste. In 1994, there had been push-back from many different organizations, especially Native communities like the Native Nations Alliance, and organizations like the Greenaction. They spread information about the potential dangers of these dumping sites. Ward Valley became prominent in environmental, indigenous, and cultural justice.

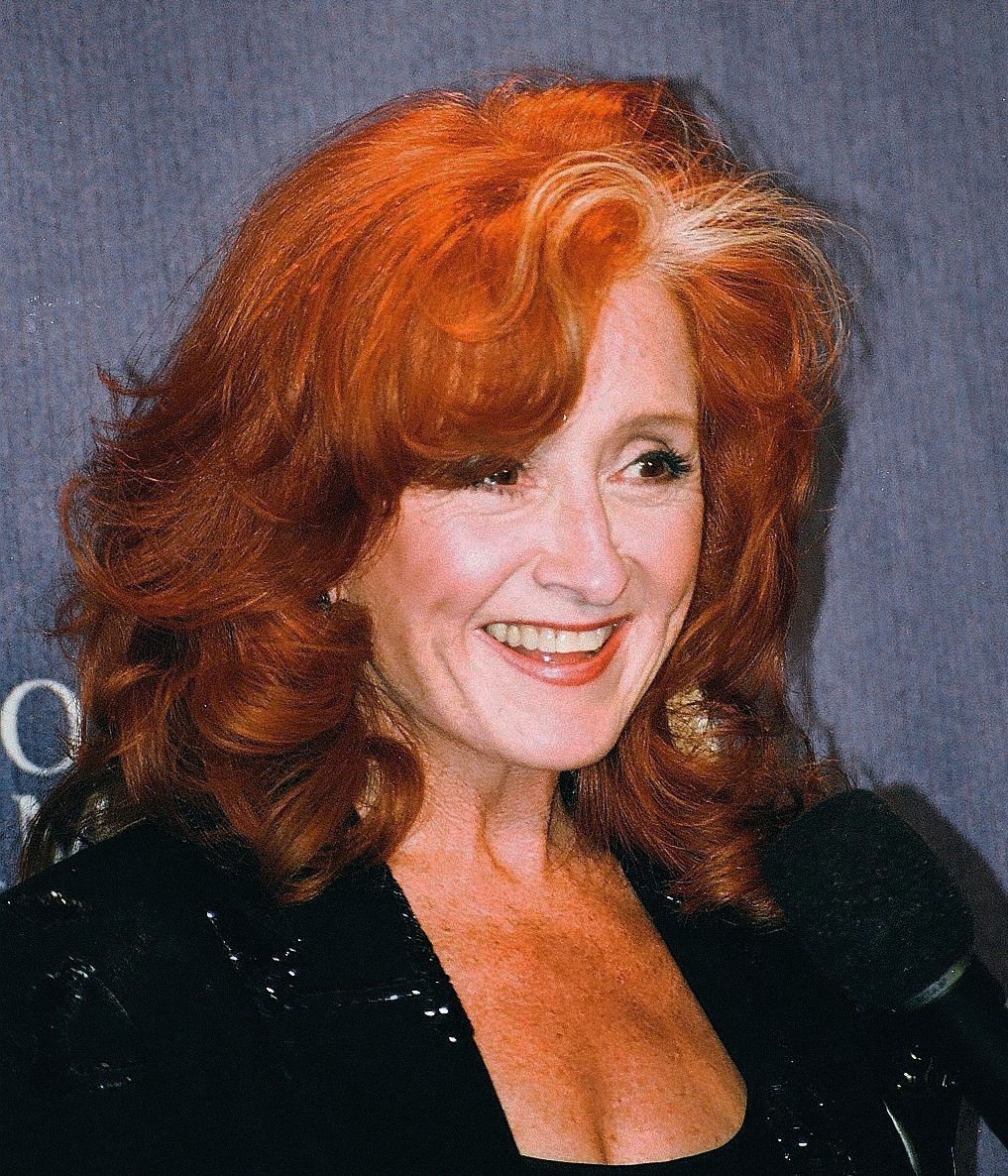
Bonnie Raitt publicly opposed the Ward Valley nuclear waste landfill

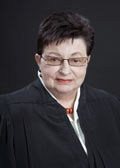
District Judge Marilyn Patel halted the transfer 1,000 acres of Ward Valley land that had been planned to become a nuclear dumping site.

Many voices were involved in this movement, including entertainers like Bonnie Raitt and Edward James Olmos, as well as activists like Jesse Jackson. These voices, along with tribal leaders, spoke at a community meeting calling on the state to halt the planned site's construction. More notable voices of the movement included District Judge Marilyn Patel who halted the transfer of 1,000 acres of Ward Valley land from the Bureau of Land Management to US Ecology, Inc. to use for the site.

The campaign led to a sustained protest on the land that lasted for over one-hundred days. The Bureau of Land Management, who owned the site at the time, announced that they would begin eviction proceedings at midnight on Friday 13, 1998 if the protesters did not depart. The protest culminated in a federal court case, US Ecology, Inc. v. Department of the Interior, et al., which sought to compel the Department of the Interior, which houses the Bureau of Land Management, to proceed with the land transfer, citing a supposed contract between the state of California and US Ecology and the federal government. On appeal, Judge Robert H. Hodges Jr. ruled against the plaintiffs, citing a lack of standing, permanently blocking the sale.

== Purpose of the movement ==
The movement, in the Native American perspective, prioritized the importance to save mother earth. They show this by holding prayers and sacred ceremonies throughout the movement such as the Spirit Run.

In 1998, the River Native Nations Alliance, the Indigenous Peoples Alliance, and the Save Ward Valley Coalition, came together and held a spirit run in honor of the success of stopping the Nuclear dump 18 miles from the Colorado River.

The ceremonies held by the Indigenous peoples of the area hoped that their message would be made more clear by showing their heritage and point of view. However, many aspects of the movement mentioned various potential dangers of nuclear waste, pointing to scientific and environmental dangers.

== Environmental dangers ==
A large portion of the movement mentioned the evidenced scientific and wildlife dangers of turning Ward Valley into the waste site. Much of the campaign highlighted the endangerment of the Ward Valley tortoise within the site. Biologists found that tortoises were experiencing Upper Respiratory Distress disease which is endangering the species residing in the desert.

In addition to this, the National Academy of Sciences (NAS) reported that the dumping site was safe, which was then proven incorrect five months after the report released. There was a discovery in a Beatty, Nevada, a site of Tritium migration. Tritium, a radioactive substance, was found to have leaked into the soil. Leading to potential runoff into the Colorado River, a major water source to a large portion of Californians and much of the Southwest. U.S. Ecology, now owned by Republic Services, made the point that the Ward Valley water source does not distribute groundwater, proving the unlikeliness.

Many scientists from the United States Geological Survey like Howard Wilshire, Keith Howard, and David Miller found that radioactive material is a serious concern with these sites and the possible leaks that might have made its way into the Colorado River.

Many of these dumps were permitted by the State Department of Health Services to allow "low-level nuclear waste from hospitals and nuclear plants" to become disposed of in area such as Ward Valley.

== Anti-nuclear movements in California ==
Ward Valley Campaigns are seemingly connected to the anti-nuclear movement in California that gained momentum in the 1970s. The movement had been amidst rising public awareness of nuclear safety issues, particularly after the Three Mile Island accident in 1979, which heightened fears regarding nuclear energy. Various grassroots organizations emerged, such as the San Luis Obispo Mothers for Peace, a group that played pivotal roles in advocacy and mobilization efforts against nuclear power in Diablo Canyon. Their goal was spreading awareness of the safety and environmental concerns of nuclear powers. The movement influenced state legislation, contributing to the implementation of stricter safety regulations and requirements for public disclosure regarding nuclear facilities. However, these issues continue as California has been behind the dumping in over 1,000 acres of land, going against environmental mandates the government has set in place.

== Involved groups and organizations ==
Involved groups and organizations have been identified as actively involved in the Ward Valley Campaign throughout the decades:

Colorado River Indian Tribe

- Fort Mojave Tribe
- Chemehuevi
- Quechan
- Cocopah
- Colorado River Indian Tribes
- Bay Area Nuclear Waste Coalition
- Greenaction
- Sierra Club
- CalPIRG
- Abalone Alliance
