= Shredit =

Shredit may refer to:

- ShredIt, software for secure data erasure
- Shred-it, Canadian document-destruction company
