= Medical Waste Tracking Act =

United States federal law

- Other short titles: Solid Waste Disposal Act Amendment
- Long title: An Act to amend the Solid Waste Disposal Act to require the Administrator of the Environmental Protection Agency to promulgate regulations on the management of infectious waste.
- Acronyms (colloquial): MWTA, IWRA
- Nicknames: Infectious Waste Regulation Act of 1987
- Enacted by: the 100th United States Congress
- Effective: November 1, 1988

Citations
- Public law: 100-582
- Statutes at Large: 102 Stat. 2950

Codification
- Titles amended: 42 U.S.C.: Public Health and Social Welfare
- U.S.C. sections created: 42 U.S.C. ch. 82, subch. X § 6992 et seq.
- U.S.C. sections amended: 42 U.S.C. ch. 82, subch. I § 6901 et seq.

Legislative history
- Introduced in the House as H.R. 3515 by Thomas Luken (D–OH) on October 20, 1987; Committee consideration by House Energy and Commerce; Passed the House on October 6, 1988 (390-28); Passed the Senate on October 7, 1988 (passed voice vote) with amendment; House agreed to Senate amendment on October 12, 1988 (agreed voice vote); Signed into law by President Ronald Reagan on November 1, 1988

The Medical Waste Tracking Act of 1988 was a United States federal law concerning the illegal dumping of body tissues, blood wastes and other contaminated biological materials. It established heavy penalties for knowingly endangering life through noncompliance. The law expired in 1991.

== Authority ==
The law created a two-year program that went into effect in New York, New Jersey, Connecticut, Rhode Island and Puerto Rico on June 24, 1989, and expired on June 21, 1991.

The H.R. 3515 legislation was passed by the 100th Congressional session and signed into law by the 40th President of the United States Ronald Reagan on November 2, 1988.

== History ==
Beginning on August 13, 1987, a "30-mile garbage slick" composed primarily of medical and household wastes prompted extensive closures of numerous New Jersey and New York beaches. Investigations ongoing throughout the year indicated that the waste likely originated from "New York City's marine transfer stations … and the Southwest Brooklyn Incinerator and Transfer Station in particular…" The then-assistant commissioner of the New Jersey Department of Environmental Protection stated his belief that the cause of pollution was intentional rather than accidental; "sealed plastic garbage bags, he said, were cut at the top, so their contents could disperse through the ocean." Such a deliberate action may have arisen given the high cost (~$1500/ton) associated with the legal disposal of the waste, thus incentivizing private waste contractors to dump illegally to avoid high fees.

Ultimately the Medical Waste Tracking Act of 1988 (MWTA) arose from the aftermath of this situation. It was designed primarily to monitor the treatment of medical wastes through their creation, transportation and destruction, i.e. from "cradle-to-grave." Congress approved the bill "to amend the Solid Waste Disposal Act to require the Administrator of the Environmental Protection Agency (EPA) to promulgate regulations on the management of infections waste." In short, Congress enacted the MWTA as a pilot study to better determine how the life cycle of medical wastes played out under federal regulations.

== Purpose ==
=== Definitions ===
Section 11002 of the MWTA, "Listing of Medical Wastes," provides a listing of definitions on what materials will be classified as "medical wastes" under the act. The list includes within its definitions: "cultures and stocks of infectious agents," "pathological wastes" such as body tissues, blood wastes and blood byproducts, sharps, contaminated carcasses and beddings of animals, surgery or autopsy wastes that were once in contact with infectious agents, "laboratory wastes," "dialysis wastes that were in contact with the blood of patients undergoing hemodialysis," medical equipment having come in contact with infectious agents, and further contaminated biological materials. Defining what objects were to be classified as medical wastes was crucial to ensure that all municipalities under the MWTA would be monitoring similar materials.

=== Management and tracking ===
Section 11003, "Tracking of Medical Waste," outlined how the program should manage the transportation of waste materials. Four requirements were primarily identified; first, to provide a means of monitoring "the transportation of waste from the generator to the disposal facility" unless said waste had previously been incinerated. Secondly, to be able to ensure the "generator of the waste" that the waste had been "received by the disposal facility." Next to develop a uniform form for the tracking of materials across states and finally to develop a means to label and contain the wastes for the safety of the handlers.

Following this, Section 11004 on "Inspections" provides provisions allowing for agents of the EPA to "enter… any establishment… where medical wastes are or have been generated" so as to conduct "monitoring", "testing", or to "obtain samples from any person.". This process would allow for the Agency to legally enter generating facilities for the purpose of determining if infectious agents and materials were being handled as prescribed by the EPA Administrator.

=== Enforcement ===
A major point of importance within the MWTA involves its inclusion of enforcement laws within the legislation. This becomes notable as it allows for one of the first instances in which an agency of the federal government may prosecute those charged with violation of regulations dealing with medical wastes. Following enactment of the MWTA the EPA Administrator may be allowed to "commence civil action in the United States district court in the district in which the violation occurred" against those being charged with the violation.

Penalties ranged based on the level of violation, whether it was done with intention, and if such acts endangered the lives of other individuals. Minor violations of compliance orders would have resulted in a fine of $25,000 per day of "continued noncompliance." Criminal penalties against those knowingly and intentionally violating the regulations of the MWTA may face two years of imprisonment or a $50,000 fine while those guilty of knowingly endangering the life of another through noncompliance may face upwards of fifteen years imprisonment and a $1,000,000 fine.

== Outcomes ==
Through the information gathered during the promulgation of regulations for the MWTA, over a period of ten years the EPA eventually "concluded that the disease-causing potential of medical waste is greatest at the point of generation and naturally tapers off after that point... Thus, risk to the general public of disease caused by exposure to medical waste is likely to be much lower than risk for the occupationally exposed individual."

After expiration of the MWTA, state environmental and health agencies have continued to regulate medical waste, rather than EPA. Other federal agencies have issued safety regulations governing the handling of medical waste, including the Centers for Disease Control and Prevention, Occupational Safety and Health Administration, and the Food and Drug Administration.

== See also ==
- Resource Conservation and Recovery Act - current U.S. federal law regulating medical waste
- Syringe Tide (in 1987 and 1988)
