= Stericycle =

American waste management company

Stericycle, Inc.
- Type: Subsidiary
- Industry: Services: compliant regulated waste disposal, secure information destruction services, recall services, sustainability services, communications services
- Founded: 1989; 37 years ago
- Headquarters: Bannockburn, Illinois, U.S.
- Revenue: US$2.66 billion (2023)
- Operating income: US$77.3 million - AOI US$315.5 million (2023)
- Total assets: US$5.35 billion (2023)
- Total equity: US$2.52 billion (2023)
- Number of employees: ~13,500 (2023)
- Parent: Waste Management, Inc.
- Website: stericycle.com

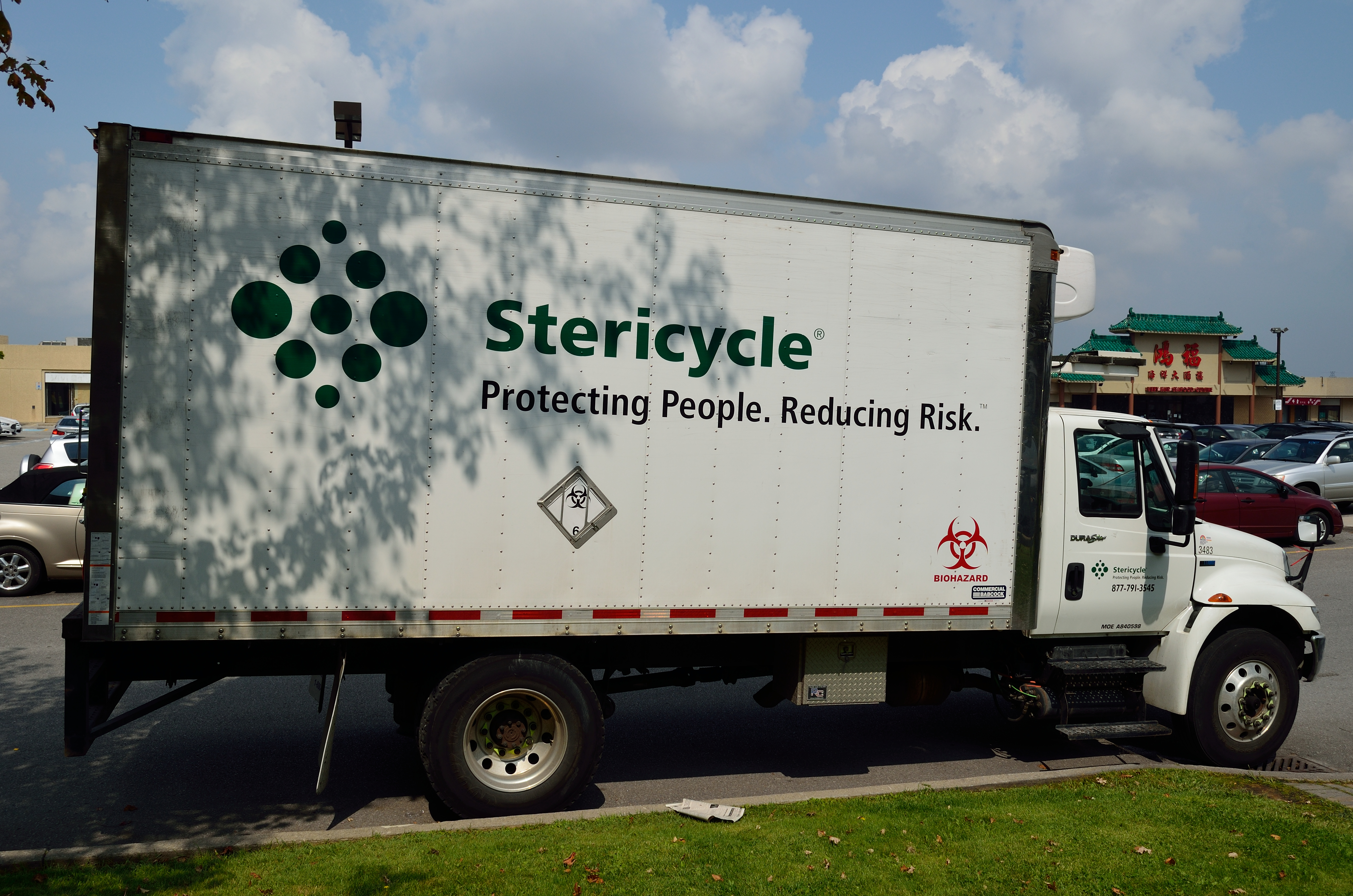
A Stericycle truck

Stericycle, Inc. is an American compliance company that specializes in collecting and disposing regulated medical waste, such as medical waste and sharps, pharmaceuticals and controlled substances, trace chemotherapy waste, and pathological waste. It also provides related education and training services. The company was founded in 1989 and is headquartered in Bannockburn, Illinois, with more bases of operation around North America and Europe.

Stericycle was publicly traded on the NASDAQ starting in 1996, until Waste Management acquired the company in 2024.

== Overview ==
Stericycle, Inc., together with its subsidiaries, offers regulated waste management services, sharps disposal containers to reduce the risk of needlestick injuries, healthcare compliance services, and drug disposal services. In addition, with the acquisition of Shred-it in 2015, Stericycle also offers secure information destruction services including document shredding and hard drive destruction.

The company serves healthcare facilities such as hospitals, blood banks, and pharmaceutical manufacturers. Stericycle also serves myriad small businesses, which include outpatient clinics, medical and dental offices, veterinary and animal hospitals, funeral homes, home healthcare agencies, body art studios, and long-term and sub-acute care facilities. Medical device manufacturers, consumer goods manufacturers, and retailers are also key customers.

Stericycle was the focus of an investigation by the state of Utah for burning waste above legal emission levels at their North Salt Lake location. The investigations were also partially in response to the alleged falsification of records regarding the destruction of those materials near Foxboro Elementary in North Salt Lake.

=== International operations ===
Stericycle has a presence in 10 countries. Approximately 10% of the company's revenue comes from its international operations. Full services are offered in the U.S., Canada, Ireland, Spain and Portugal. Stericycle offers all services, except for hazardous waste management, in the United Kingdom. Only secure information destruction services are provided in Austria, Belgium, France, Germany, the Netherlands, and Luxembourg.

Stericycle no longer operates in Argentina, Brazil, Chile, Japan, Mexico, Australia, South Korea, Romania, United Arab Emirates, and Singapore.

== History ==
Stericycle was founded in 1989 by Dr. James Sharp based on his business plan to address the Syringe Tide, where hypodermic needles and other medical waste washed up to the shores of New York and New Jersey. The Syringe Tide led to the Medical Waste Tracking Act, signed in 1988, establishing regulated medical waste management as an industry.

In 1992, Mark Miller stepped in as President and CEO, and as a result of Miller's leadership, Stericycle grew rapidly, going public in 1996 on the NASDAQ (ticker SRCL). The company's international business began in 1997 with a joint venture in Mexico. Since then, Stericycle has created services, tools and resources for healthcare professionals not only in the United States and Mexico, but also in Argentina, Brazil, Canada, Chile, Ireland, Japan, Portugal, Puerto Rico, Romania, Spain, and the United Kingdom. In 1999, Stericycle acquired 200,000 customers from Allied Waste Industries after Allied acquired Browning Ferris Industries. Also In 1999, Stericycle began offering safety and medical compliance training services with the launch of its Stericycle Steri-Safe OSHA Compliance program.

=== Expansion ===
In the 2000s, Stericycle achieved growth through launching and/or acquiring complementary business lines, as well as continued international expansion. In 2003, Stericycle entered sharps waste management, acquiring Scherer Healthcare's existing practice and occasionally referring to parts of the service as “Bio Systems” in markets like Ireland. In 2004, Stericycle began providing medical waste disposal solutions in the United Kingdom with more international growth following. In 2008, Stericycle acquired its first hazardous waste removal company and in 2010 started its Communications Solutions business line with the acquisition of NotifyMD, among several other acquisitions. The acquisition of PSC Environmental Solutions in 2014 in a deal worth $275 million led to the formal establishment of Stericycle Environmental Solutions focused on hazardous waste. Finally, Stericycle's largest acquisition to date, Shred-it, occurred in 2015, for US$2.3 billion.

The company lost a contract to provide clinical waste services to GPs and pharmacies in Cumbria and north-east England in April 2017, when their competitor, Healthcare Environment Services put in a substantially cheaper offer, of £310,000, than theirs of £479,999. Stericycle then initiated a legal challenge against NHS England’s decision which was dismissed by the High Court of Justice in July 2018, and the company's behaviour severely criticised. Their commercial director Lindsay Dransfield was described as “a broadly unsatisfactory witness”. A confidential settlement was reached in 2019, ending the litigation.

In October 2017, a $295 million settlement was reached on behalf of a nationwide class of Stericycle customers, following a class-action lawsuit accusing the company of engaging in a price-increasing scheme that automatically inflated customers' bills up to 18 percent biannually, according to a news release from Hagens Berman, the Chicago-based law firm that represented the class.

In Spring 2022, Stericycle released the Safeshield antimicrobial medical waste container, which was designed for the storage and transport of regulated medical waste. The continued redesigning of products aims to condense the amount of container types provided by the company from over 150 to less than 20.

In June 2024, Stericycle accepted an offer from WM (formerly Waste Management Inc) to acquire the business for $7.2 billion. The acquisition was completed in November 2024, and the company became a wholly owned subsidiary of WM.

In January 2025 Urbaser completed the acquisition of Stericycle’s biosanitary waste management businesses in Spain and Portugal. The deal, announced in October 2024, has been completed according to the expected timeline.

== Services ==
Stericycle offers the following types of specialized waste management:

- Regulated medical waste management
- Hazardous waste management
- Sharps waste management
- Pharmaceutical waste or environmentally persistent pharmaceutical pollutants
- Drug disposal
- Integrated Waste Stream services – coordinating multiple waste streams for one entity

Beyond services related to healthcare wastes, in some markets the company has expanded its offerings to include management of certain hazardous wastes as well as patient transport and medical courier services. Stericycle offers secure information destruction, for both paper and hard drive, through Shred-it.

The company also offers compliance training primarily through online courses focused on applying industry regulations related to information security, human resources, medical billing, and other topics. They have also developed training software related to compliance.

During the COVID-19 pandemic, the company managed the transportation, treatment, and disposal of potentially infectious items. The company developed strategies for PPE disposal, including a waste pickup and mailback option. In 2021, Stericycle and UPS partnered through UPS Healthcare, creating a system to manage the reverse logistics of medical waste, including the transportation, treatment, and disposal of waste.

Beginning in 2021, Stericycle has published an annual Healthcare Workplace Safety Trend Report, which analyzes issues within the medical workplace, including comparisons of day-to-day stress on a yearly basis, and the importance of medical waste management.

=== UK ===
The company has a contract for collection and disposal services to around 700 GP practices across Hampshire and Isle of Wight, Buckinghamshire, Surrey, Sussex, Oxfordshire and Berkshire and acute NHS trusts in England. In 2020 it suffered from capacity problems and failed to collect clinical waste routinely from 139 practices during September and October. 245 collections were missed. They said that the NHS was producing significantly higher volumes of clinical waste than expected because of the amount of Personal protective equipment being used.

== Community involvement ==
=== Opioid crisis ===
In 2018, Stericycle joined the National Safety Council as the medicine disposal partner for a nationwide campaign. Stericycle served as a leading voice on safe disposal practices giving away thousands of Seal&Send Mail Back Envelopes consumers could drop in any mailbox.

The Stop Everyday Killers campaign began with the unveiling of Prescribed to Death: A Memorial to the Victims of the Opioid Crisis in Chicago. The exhibit includes a memorial wall made of pills carved with faces that represent the 22,000 people lost last year to prescription opioid overdose.

In 2019, Stericycle partnered with the National Safety Council to launch the Opioids at Work Employer Toolkit.

In 2020, Stericycle partnered with the Rural Community Assistance Partnership (RCAP) on a program, focusing on improving water quality through the removal of unused prescription opiates. RCAP distributed 10,000 of Stericycle’s medication mail-back envelopes to rural communities in the United States, allowing people to mail back their unused medicines for destruction and disposal through regulated means.

=== SteriCares Hardship Fund ===
Stericycle operates a fund that allows employees to support other employees in times of hardship. Stericycle employees have helped over 250 Stericycle families with over $515,000 in grants since 2016. During the fund's biggest year ever in 2017, employees raised $160,000 alone in emergency relief following Hurricane Harvey, Hurricane Irma, and Hurricane Maria. The company currently operates the fund in the US, Canada, and Ireland.

After Hurricane Harvey hit Houston in 2017, Stericycle team members amassed three truckloads of donations that were distributed to families across five Stericycle sites in Houston. After Hurricane Maria, Stericycle facilities in Puerto Rico became gathering zones for hot meals, water, laundry service, showers, and shelter to team members who lost their homes.

=== Global food aid ===
Since 2011, Stericycle has supported Feed My Starving Children, an organization benefiting malnourished children around the world.

=== American Diabetes Association partnership ===
Stericycle partnered with the American Diabetes Association (ADA) in 2019. Stericycle's partnership with the ADA includes providing consumer-based education, raising awareness and sponsoring key events, such as the Tour de Cure.

== Environmental impact ==
In 2011, the Texas Commission on Environmental Quality alleged Stericycle "failed to dispose of pathological waste according to approved methods of treatment and disposition" in violation of 30 Tex. Admin. Code § 330.1219(b)(3). Stericycle denied the charges but agreed to a settlement that included a fine of $34,000.

In September 2013, Erin Brockovich joined in with Utah residents in their call for Stericycle to discontinue their business in North Salt Lake. Brockovich's visit was spurred by a violation notice from the Utah Division of Air Quality to Stericycle for excessive emissions above legal limits, and manipulating their reporting to show lower amounts of Mercury, Dioxins, and other potentially harmful chemicals emitted through burning medical waste. The violations in 2013 were followed by criminal investigations at the order of Utah Governor Gary Herbert. Investigations by California's Soil Water Air Protection Enterprise, or SWAPE, in connection with Ms. Brockovich, discovered dioxins in homes near the incinerator at levels 16 times higher than what is considered safe. On December 1, 2014, Stericycle and the Utah Division of Air Quality reached an agreement acknowledging no wrongdoing, though the settlement does require Stericycle to relocate approximately 40 miles to the west of the incinerator's previous location in North Salt Lake. The settlement also called for Stericycle to pay a $2.3 million fine, half of which was forgivable if the move happened within three years, ending in 2017. In 2022, the North Salt Lake incinerator was shut down.

In 2021, Stericycle announced a $1 million, 5 year partnership with the National Park Foundation. The commitment supports landscape and wildlife conservation with a focus on wetland restoration, which supported efforts in the Timucuan Ecological and Historic Preserve and at the Cumberland Island National Seashore.

Through a partnership with the Arbor Day Foundation in 2022 and 2023, Stericycle planted more than 120,000 trees across North America and the United Kingdom. Also in 2023, Stericycle supported the Ackerson Meadow Restoration Project in Yosemite National Park and a project at the Cape Cod National Seashore through its partnership with the National Park Foundation.

In 2023, Stericycle participated in the Carbon Disclosure Project’s Climate Change program, receiving a "B" score. The company has reported to the CDP since 2021.

== Recognition ==
Stericycle was named the 2023 Green Company of the Year in the Business Intelligence Group (BIG) Awards for Business program.

Stericycle was recognized by Newsweek on multiple of their 2024 lists, including “America’s Greatest Workplaces for Diversity”, “America’s Greatest Workplaces for Women”, “America’s Greatest Workplace for Mental Wellbeing”, and “America’s Greatest Workplaces”.
