= Healthcare Environmental Services =

Scottish medical waste company

Healthcare Environment Services (HES) Limited (company number SC173861) was a company based in Shotts. It claimed to be the largest independent medical waste management solutions company in the UK. On 30 April 2019, HES was placed into liquidation

== History ==
HES was a private limited company, incorporated on 26 March 1997. Its registered office address was Hassockrigg Ecopark, Shotts Road, Shotts, Lanarkshire, ML7 5TQ. Companies House lists two stated "Persons with significant control", Mr Garry Pettigrew (Director and Secretary) and Mrs Alison Pettigrew (Director).

As of the 1st if May, 2019 the companies status on Companies House states that HES are "In Liquidation".

What relationship, if any, exists between HES Ltd, One Waste Solution Limited, HEG Sustainable Solutions Limited, Healthcare Sharp Systems oLimited, Healthcare Environmental (Group) Limited, and Healthcare Washroom Services Limited is unclear, other than the fact that Mr Garry Pettigrew is a named Officer in each.

HES Ltd acquired GW Butler Ltd in 2014 which led to the Competition and Markets Authority (CMA) issuing a formal enforcement order in November 2014. On 18 March 2018 the CMA cleared the completed acquisition.

All the 400 staff at HES were given redundancy notices on 27 December 2018 as a result of the scandal outlined below and the company went into liquidation in April 2019.

== Operational Sites ==
=== England ===
The company operated waste management facilities in England:

- HES Ltd, North Tyne, Newcastle
- HES Ltd, Normanton

=== Scotland ===
The company operated two [three?] waste management facilities in Scotland:

- HES Ltd, Gourdie Industrial Estate, Dundee
- HES Ltd, Hassockrigg, Shotts
- HES Ltd, Aberdeen (?)

== Contracts ==
In 2009 the HES Ltd won a 10-year contract to dispose of NHS Scotland's clinical waste, including waste from all the Scottish hospitals, GP's surgeries, dental practices and pharmacies, from the incumbent service provider Stericycle.

Bidding for the next 10 year NHS Scotland contract (NP805/19 Healthcare Waste Services across NHS Scotland), worth an estimated £140 million, opened on 3 June 2018 and closed on 12 September 2018.

In April 2017 HES Limited won a contract to provide clinical waste services to GPs and pharmacies in Cumbria and north-east England, after putting in a substantially cheaper offer, of £310,000, than the incumbent contract holder, Stericycle, which bid £479,999. Stericycle launched a legal challenge against NHS England’s decision which was dismissed in a judgment issued by the Honourable Mr Justice Fraser on 27 July 2018. The judgement severely criticized the behavior of SRCL (Stericycle).

== Scandal ==
A scandal erupted in October 2018 when it emerged that HES Ltd, which had contracts for managing clinical waste produced by the NHS in Scotland and England, was in breach of its environmental permits at four of its six sites in England [reference] for having more waste on site than their permit allowed, and storing waste inappropriately.

HES Ltd have repeatedly stated that the backlog of clinical and healthcare waste, which has led to the compliance issues at their sites, is a direct consequence of reduced available capacity at the incinerators (particularity high-temperature incinerators), as well as the re-classification of clinical waste as "offensive", which has meant more waste NHS trusts now needs to be incinerated. Waste classed as "offensive" waste could simply have been sent to landfill, however the NHS are now classifying this same waste stream as hazardous waste meaning it must now be incinerated. Incinerating more waste helps the NHS comply with the Governments and own aspiration of reducing waste to landfill. There is some support within the industry sector that the reclassification of the "offensive" waste is putting pressure on the incinerators.

As a result of the backlog of waste at HES Ltd sites, and the ongoing enforcement action by the Environment Agency, 17 NHS trusts in Yorkshire terminated their contracts [reference]. HES Ltd was reported as saying it was going to sue the relevant trusts for compensation of "upwards of £15 million" however it is unclear if they have started proceedings. HES Ltd still has contracts with 30 other trusts in England, and a waste disposal contract with NHS England for primary care and pharmacy.

The backlog of clinical waste and issues with HES Ltd, including the possibility of service disruption and the knock-on impact this could have on the NHS, led to the issue being discussed at a meeting of the Cobra national incident committee. As part of an emergency plan the Government handed the contracts to Mitie to ensure a level of continuity in service.

Concern has been raised that the Government is employing double standards after concerns around the way waste was being stored on the site now under the control of Mitie came to light. In particular HES Ltd state that the storage conditions at the Mitie sites is worse than those at their own sites, which resulted in them being subject to enforcement action, which led to the loss of contracts in the first place. However the Government have said that Mitite have had no issue finding the necessary incineration capacity to dispose of the waste, something which HES Ltd said was the principal reason for the backlog developing. HES Ltd have countered this by saying that is because Mitie are paying an excessive fee for that capacity and that "a number of clinical waste contractors have sought to profit from the current situation by increasing their standard tonnage rates". Had they had that money at their disposal, they too could have paid the premium price for the capacity, however they had to work within the agreed rates in the contracts.

In November 2018 the company released minutes of a meeting where Fiona Daly, an NHS Improvement official "acknowledged there appeared to be national market capacity issue". The Environment Agency denies that there is a shortage of suitable incinerator capacity. In addition to enforcement activity to clear the sites, they have launched a criminal investigation. They had issued 13 warning notices and two compliance notices in the last year. The Scottish Environment Protection Agency had also issued enforcement notices in respect of the sites in Dundee and Shotts.

The company transferred 23 workers from its Normanton site to Mitie, under the Transfer of Undertakings (Protection of Employment) Regulations 2006, but Mitie denied that they had been transferred. It emerged that Mitie was charging the 18 trusts in Yorkshire and Humber £10.4 million per year where HES had been charging them £3.3 million.

On 6 December HES stopped collecting clinical waste from many NHS trusts after the company was informed it would lose the Scottish NHS contract, and its banking facilities were cut off. The NHS trusts have had to set up temporary storage measures under the NHS Emergency Preparedness Resilience and Response procedures after having been let down by the company.

A report, based on Environment Agency documents, published in January 2019 said that anatomical waste from NHS hospitals was not stored in fridges as it should have been. The refrigeration unit at Normanton was seen not to be working in July 2018, at which time the site had more than 356 tonnes of waste stored, five times more than was authorised. In February 2018 there were 14 carts full of anatomical waste stored outside the refrigeration unit in Newcastle.

In March 2019 it emerged that there was indeed a shortage of clinical waste incineration capacity and hospitals were asked by NHS England to stockpile clinical waste. The contract with Mitie was estimated to be triple the price previously charged by HES.

A new contract for waste disposal in Scotland was set up with Tradebe Healthcare National, a Spanish company, to start in August 2019.

The Normanton site was taken over by Sharpsmart in 2019. They discovered 400 tonnes of clinical waste, including some marked radioactive in a bin dated June 2017.

== Environmental Compliance ==
In order to operate their waste management facilities, the company must obtain and comply with the relevant environmental authorizations, from the relevant regulator. In England it is the Environment Agency (EA), and in Scotland it is the Scottish Environment Protection Agency (SEPA).

Inspection reports, and reports submitted in compliance with the conditions of the authorizations, are held on a public register.

=== Scotland ===
Source Data: SEPA Compliance
		Compliance Rating***							
Site	Authorisation Number	2010	2011	2012	2013	2014	2015	2016	2017
HES Ltd, Calderhead Road, Shotts*	PPC/A/1019535	Poor	Poor	Very Poor	Very Poor	Poor	Broadly Compliant	Excellent**	N/A
HES Ltd, Hassockrigg, Shotts Road, Shotts	PPC/A/1111773	N/A	N/A	N/A	N/A	N/A	N/A	Excellent	Good
HES Ltd, Dundee	PPC/A/1033633	Poor	Poor	Poor	Poor	Very Poor	Broadly Compliant	Broadly Compliant	Good

*Operations at the Calderhead Road site ceased early 2016 and moved to the custom built site at Hassockrigg, Shotts Road.

**The rating of Excellent is misleading as the site ceased operating at this particular site as early as February 2016.

*** The number of inspections on which each compliance rating is made is highly variable.

=== England ===
[Data on compliance at sites regulated by EA?]

Site	Authorization Number
HES Ltd, North Tyne, Newcastle upon Tyne	EPR/LP3936AB
HES Ltd, Normanton	

== Awards ==
- Green Apple Award Winner 2014
- Lanarkshire Business Excellence Award 2017
