= Syringe tide =

1987 pollution incident in the United States

The syringe tide was an environmental disaster during 1987–88 in Connecticut, New Jersey and New York where significant amounts of medical waste, including hypodermic syringes, and raw garbage washed up onto beaches on the Jersey Shore, in New York City, and on Long Island. This forced the closing of beaches on the Atlantic coast. Officials scrambled to identify the source of the material as some local economies struggled with diminished tourism.

== Reaction ==
Reports of medical waste and sewage spills drove away hundreds of thousands of vacationers, costing the $7.7-billion-a-year tourism industry on the Jersey Shore more than $1 billion in lost revenue that summer, tourism officials say. Later the losses were tallied between 15 and 40% of typical tourism revenue.

== Sources and reaction ==
Officials finally traced the source of the waste to the Fresh Kills Landfill on Staten Island. After much deliberation, New York City was required to pay $1 million for past pollution damages as well as pay for the cleanup. No reparations were paid to the business owners on the Jersey Shore for revenues lost during the months of inactivity.

In response to syringe tides of 1987 and 1988, the participants in the New Jersey Harbor Estuary Program (HEP) implemented the Short-term Floatables Action Plan. The successful plan has been implemented since 1989 and is supposed to curtail floatable debris wash-ups by intercepting debris slicks within the harbor. With this plan, the extent of beach closures declined from over 70 miles (110 km) in 1988 to fewer than 4 miles (6.4 km) in 1989, and closures have remained at a low level in later years. The Short-term Floatables Action Plan has four key elements:

- Surveillance: Environmental organizations conduct regular air and sea patrols of the harbor to look for and report slicks of floatable debris.
- Regular Cleanups: The United States Army Corps of Engineers (USACE) use cleanup vessels to collect floatable debris in the harbor and focuses its activities on conditions when slicks are most likely to occur.
- Non-routine Cleanups: USACE also attempts to capture additional debris slicks in the harbor when they are detected and reported.
- Communications Network: United States Environmental Protection Agency coordinates a reporting network as well as cleanup activities among all the program participants.

== See also ==
- Marine debris
- Ocean Dumping Act
- Medical Waste Tracking Act
