= Biomedical waste =

Waste containing infectious material

Biomedical waste or hospital waste is any kind of waste containing infectious (or potentially infectious) materials generated during the treatment of humans or animals as well as during research involving biologics. It may also include waste associated with the generation of biomedical waste that visually appears to be of medical or laboratory origin (e.g. packaging, unused bandages, infusion kits etc.), as well research laboratory waste containing biomolecules or organisms that are mainly restricted from environmental release. As detailed below, discarded sharps are considered biomedical waste whether they are contaminated or not, due to the possibility of being contaminated with blood and their propensity to cause injury when not properly contained and disposed. Biomedical waste is a type of biowaste.

Biomedical waste may be solid or liquid. Examples of infectious waste include discarded blood, sharps, unwanted microbiological cultures and stocks, identifiable body parts (including those as a result of amputation), other human or animal tissue, used bandages and dressings, discarded gloves, other medical supplies that may have been in contact with blood and body fluids, and laboratory waste that exhibits the characteristics described above. Waste sharps include potentially contaminated used (and unused discarded) needles, scalpels, lancets and other devices capable of penetrating skin.

Biomedical waste is generated from biological and medical sources and activities, such as the diagnosis, prevention, or treatment of diseases. Common generators (or producers) of biomedical waste include hospitals, health clinics, nursing homes, emergency medical services, medical research laboratories, offices of physicians, dentists, veterinarians, home health care and morgues or funeral homes. In healthcare facilities (i.e. hospitals, clinics, doctor's offices, veterinary hospitals and clinical laboratories), waste with these characteristics may alternatively be called medical or clinical waste. Within healthcare facilities, operating rooms (ORs) generate the most waste, contributing to the polluted environment.

Biomedical waste is distinct from normal trash or general waste, and differs from other types of hazardous waste, such as chemical, radioactive, universal or industrial waste. Medical facilities generate waste hazardous chemicals and radioactive materials. While such wastes are normally not infectious, they require proper disposal. Some wastes are considered multihazardous, such as tissue samples preserved in formalin.

== Effects on humans ==
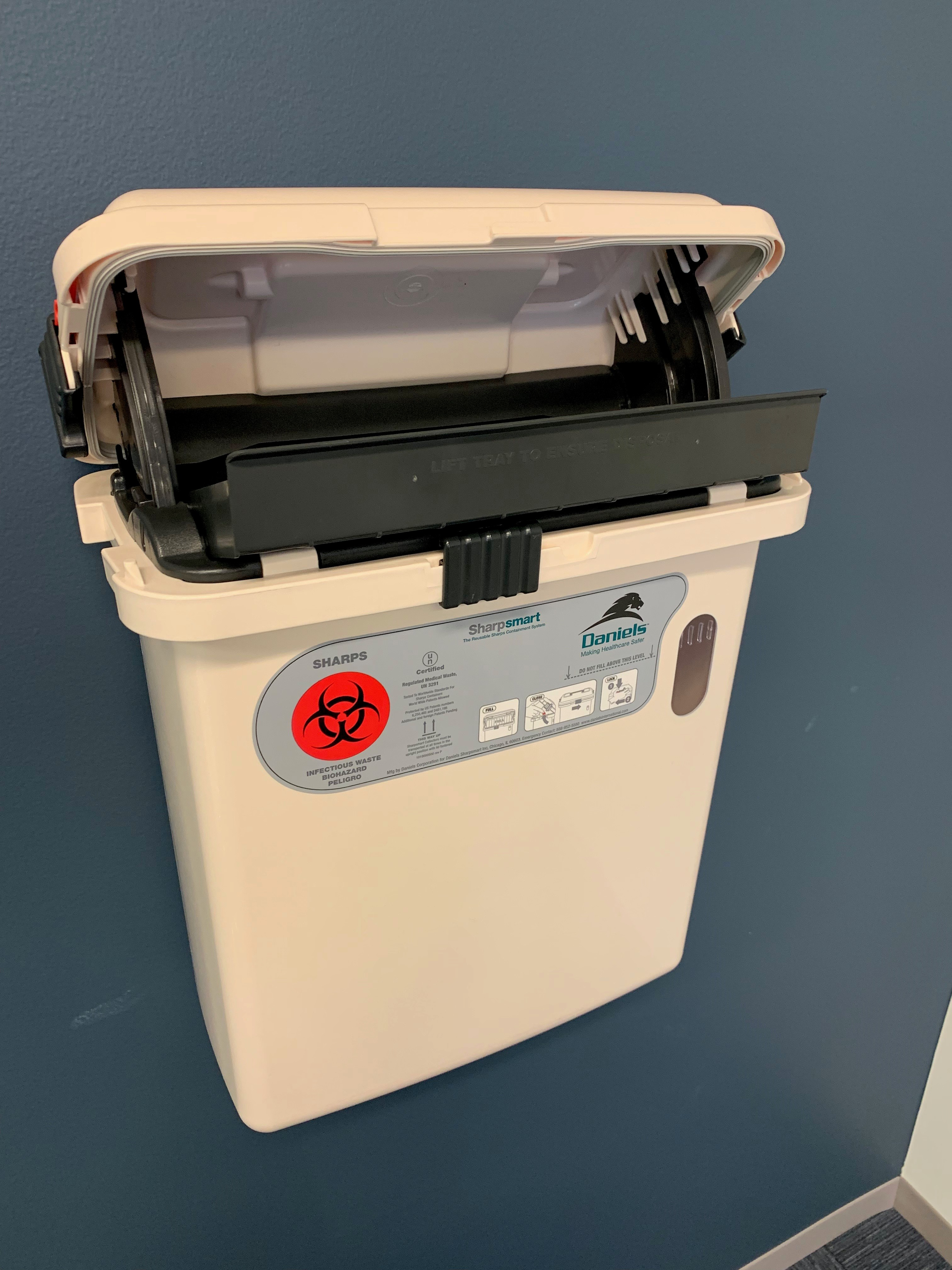
Sharpsmart Reusable Sharps Container

Disposal of this waste is an environmental concern, as many medical wastes are classified as infectious or biohazardous and could potentially lead to the spread of infectious disease. The most common danger for humans is the infection which also affects other living organisms in the region. Daily exposure to the wastes (landfills) leads to accumulation of harmful substances or microbes in the person's body.

A 1990 report by the United States Agency for Toxic Substances and Disease Registry concluded that the general public is not likely to be adversely affected by biomedical waste generated in the traditional healthcare setting. They found, however, that biomedical waste from those settings may pose an injury and exposure risks via occupational contact with medical waste for doctors, nurses, and janitorial, laundry and refuse workers. Further, there are opportunities for the general public to come into contact with medical waste, such as needles used illicitly outside healthcare settings, or biomedical waste generated via home health care.

== Management ==
Biomedical waste must be properly managed and disposed of to protect the environment, general public and workers, especially healthcare and sanitation workers who are at risk of exposure to biomedical waste as an occupational hazard. Steps in the management of biomedical waste include generation, accumulation, handling, storage, treatment, transport and disposal.

The development and implementation of a national waste management policy can improve biomedical waste management in health facilities in a country.

=== On-site versus off-site ===
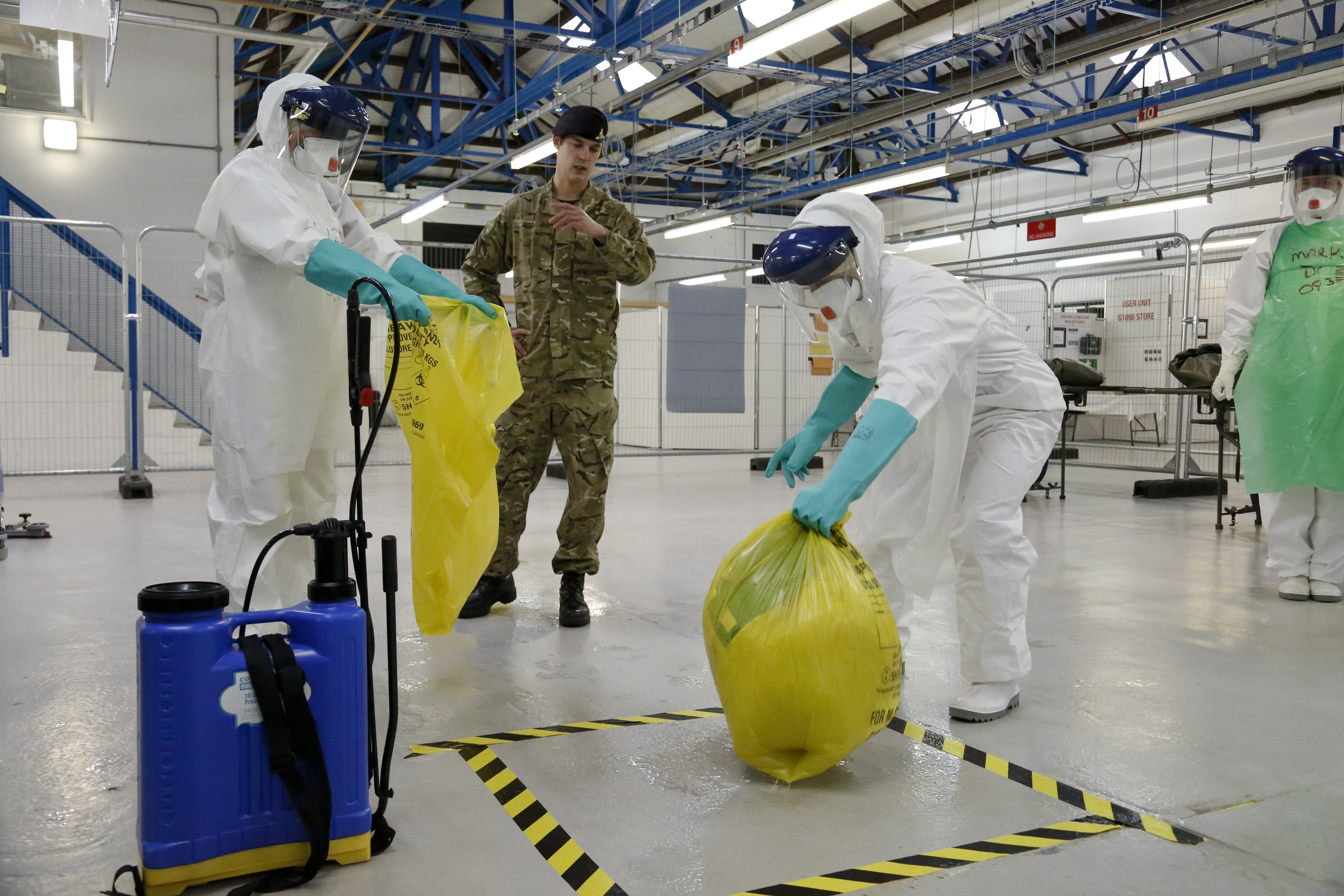
Healthcare workers being trained to safely handle contaminated wastes before assignment to an outbreak of Ebola hemorrhagic fever.

Disposal occurs off-site, at a location that is different from the site of generation. Treatment may occur on-site or off-site. On-site treatment of large quantities of biomedical waste usually requires the use of relatively expensive equipment, and is generally only cost effective for very large hospitals and major universities who have the space, labour and budget to operate such equipment. Off-site treatment and disposal involves hiring of a biomedical waste disposal service whose employees are trained to collect and haul away biomedical waste in special containers for treatment at a facility designed to handle biomedical waste.

=== Generation and accumulation ===
Biomedical waste should be collected in containers that are leak-proof and sufficiently strong to prevent breakage during handling. Containers of biomedical waste are marked with a biohazard symbol. The container, marking, and labels are often red.

Discarded sharps are usually collected in specialized boxes, often called needle boxes.

Specialized equipment is required to meet OSHA 29 CFR 1910.1450 and EPA 40 CFR 264.173. standards of safety. Minimal recommended equipment include a fume hood and primary and secondary waste containers to capture potential overflow. Even beneath the fume hood, containers containing chemical contaminants should remain closed when not in use. An open funnel placed in the mouth of a waste container has been shown to allow significant evaporation of chemicals into the surrounding atmosphere, which is then inhaled by laboratory personnel, and contributes a primary component to the threat of completing the fire triangle. To protect the health and safety of laboratory staff as well as neighboring civilians and the environment, proper waste management equipment, such as the Burkle funnel in Europe and the ECO Funnel in the U.S., should be utilized in any department which deals with chemical waste. It is to be dumped after treatment.

Operating Rooms

ORs generate around one-third of waste in a hospital. This waste includes but is not limited to biohazards, plastic materials, pharmaceuticals, and linens. Moreover, ORs require large amounts of energy, causing a further negative environmental impact. This is why managing waste generated by ORs is crucial to minimizing overall biomedical waste production. To reduce waste and cost of disposal, recycling and properly labeling waste are imperative. Reusing and repurposing products like gowns and instruments also limit costs and waste. Moreover, streamlining surgical trays and packaging of instruments also promotes a reduction in waste production. Energy saving methods in areas like HVAC systems and anesthesia must also be implemented to promote a "greener" healthcare industry.

The reason ORs generate such an abundance of waste is because of a lack of education of surgeons regarding every surgical procedures' contribution to the carbon footprint. When asked in a survey, in a global cohort consisting of 1,024 surgeons, only 63% indicated that they regarded sustainability as an issue they felt motivated to change. Moreover, only 7.7% of surgeons could estimate the carbon footprint of a surgery, and only 6.5% could estimate their surgical supplies' carbon footprint. This shows an evident knowledge gap surgeons have in regards to the negative environmental effects of surgery and the need to rectify this through education.

=== Storage and handling ===
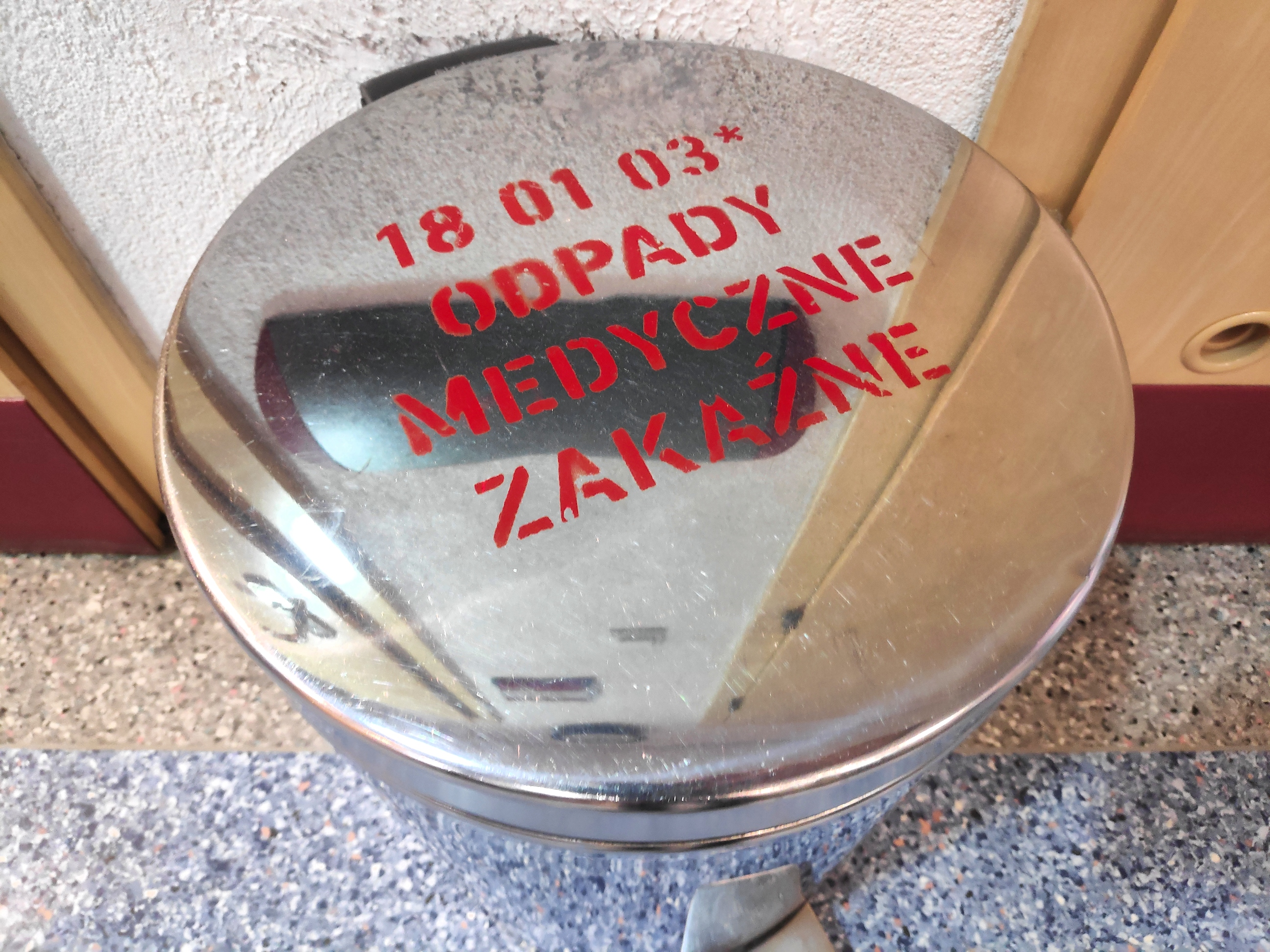
Waste bin for infectious medical waste in a hospital in Poland

Storage refers to keeping the waste until it is treated on-site or transported off-site for treatment or disposal. There are many options and containers for storage. Regulatory agencies may limit the time for which waste can remain in storage. Handling is the act of moving biomedical waste between the point of generation, accumulation areas, storage locations and on-site treatment facilities. Workers who handle biomedical waste must observe standard precautions.

=== Treatment ===
The goals of biomedical waste treatment are to reduce or eliminate the waste's hazards, and usually to make the waste unrecognizable. Treatment should render the waste safe for subsequent handling and disposal. There are several treatment methods that can accomplish these goals. It includes segregating the bio waste.

Biomedical waste is often incinerated. An efficient incinerator will destroy pathogens and sharps. Source materials are not recognizable in the resulting ash. Alternative thermal treatment can also include technologies such as gasification and pyrolysis including energy recovery with similar waste volume reductions and pathogen destruction.

An autoclave may also be used to treat biomedical waste. An autoclave uses steam and pressure to sterilize the waste or reduce its microbiological load to a level at which it may be safely disposed of. Many healthcare facilities routinely use an autoclave to sterilize medical supplies. If the same autoclave is used to sterilize supplies and treat biomedical waste, administrative controls must be used to prevent the waste operations from contaminating the supplies. Effective administrative controls include operator training, strict procedures, and separate times and space for processing biomedical waste.

Microwave disinfection can also be employed for treatment of biomedical wastes. Microwave irradiation is a type of non-contact heating technologies for disinfection. Microwave chemistry is based on efficient heating of materials by microwave dielectric heating effects. When exposed to microwave frequencies, the dipoles of the water molecules present in cells re-align with the applied electric field. As the field oscillates, the dipoles attempts to realign itself with the alternating electric field and in this process, energy is lost in the form of heat through molecular friction and dielectric loss. Microwave disinfection is a recently developed technology that provides an advantage over old existing technologies of autoclaves as microwave-based disinfection has less cycle time, power consumption and it requires minimal usage of water and consumables as compared to autoclaves.

For liquids and small quantities, a 1–10% solution of bleach can be used to disinfect biomedical waste. Solutions of sodium hydroxide and other chemical disinfectants may also be used, depending on the waste's characteristics. Other treatment methods include heat, alkaline digesters and the use of microwaves.

For autoclaves and microwave systems, a shredder may be used as a final treatment step to render the waste unrecognizable. Some autoclaves have built-in shredders.

== Country-wise regulation and management ==
The international symbol for biological hazard.

=== United Kingdom ===
In the UK, clinical waste and the way it is to be handled is closely regulated. Applicable legislation includes the Environmental Protection Act 1990 (Part II), Waste Management Licensing Regulations 1994, and the Hazardous Waste Regulations (England & Wales) 2005, as well as the Special Waste Regulations in Scotland. A scandal erupted in October 2018 when it emerged that Healthcare Environment Services, which had contracts for managing clinical waste produced by the NHS in Scotland and England, was in breach of the environmental permits at four of its six sites by having more waste on site than their permit allows and storing waste inappropriately. Seventeen NHS trusts in Yorkshire terminated their contracts immediately. The company sued for compensation. Amputated limbs were said to be among 350 tonnes of clinical waste stockpiled instead of incinerated in Normanton. The company maintains that the problem was caused by a reduction in incineration capacity, and the re-classification of clinical waste as "offensive", which meant more needed incineration. The government's contingency plans included installing temporary storage units at hospitals, but the company say that this is more dangerous than allowing them to exceed their permitted allowances. The company still has contracts with 30 other trusts in England, and a waste disposal contract with NHS England for primary care and pharmacy.

=== United States ===
In the United States, biomedical waste is usually regulated as medical waste. In 1988 the U.S. federal government passed the Medical Waste Tracking Act which allowed the EPA to establish rules for management of medical waste in some parts of the country. After the Act expired in 1991, responsibility to regulate and pass laws concerning the disposal of medical waste returned to the individual states. The states vary in their regulations from none to very strict.

In addition to on-site treatment or pickup by a biomedical waste disposal firm for off-site treatment, a mail-back disposal option allows generators of waste to return it to the manufacturer. For instance, waste medicines and equipment can be returned. The waste is shipped through the U.S. postal service. While available in all 50 U.S. states, mail-back medical waste disposal is limited by very strict postal regulations (i.e., collection containers must comply with requirements set out by the Food and Drug Administration, while shipping containers must be approved by the postal service for use).

=== India ===
The Bio-medical Waste (Management and Handling) Rules, 1998 and further amendments were passed for the regulation of bio-medical waste management. On 28 March 2016 Biomedical Waste Management Rules (BMW 2016) were also notified by Central Govt. Each state's Pollution Control Board or Pollution control Committee will be responsible for implementing the new legislation. New regulations affect the distribution of medical waste by medical professionals into their proper receptacles.

Due to the competition to improve quality and so as to get accreditation from agencies like ISO, the NABH, JCI, and many private organizations have initiated proper biomedical waste disposal but still the gap is huge.

Many studies took place in Gujarat, India regarding the knowledge of workers in facilities such as hospitals, nursing homes, or home health. It was found that 26% of doctors and 43% of paramedical staff were unaware of the risks related to biomedical wastes. After extensively looking at the different facilities, many were undeveloped in the area regarding biomedical waste. The rules and regulations in India work with The Bio-medical Waste (Management and Handling) Rules from 1998, yet a large number of health care facilities were found to be sorting the waste incorrectly.

The National Green Tribunal (NGT) has been strict on the application of the BMW 2016 over a undetermined period of time. There are now over 200 licensed Common Bio Medical Waste Treatment and Disposal Facilities (CBWTDF) or Common Treatment Facility (CTF) in the country. The training of Health Care Facility staff and the awareness of the Hazards of Bio Medical waste is still a challenge in the country. The compliance is enforced through penalties, and awareness. The CTF are operational in most Tier 1 cities and Tier 2 cities of India, compliance is high today because of the National Green Tribunal. Lack of said awareness has led to issues of improper segregation. In Tier 2 and 3 cities the general waste is also mixed with biomedical waste.

The latest guidelines for segregation of bio-medical waste recommend the following color coding:

- Red Bag – Syringes (without needles), soiled gloves, catheters, IV tubes etc. should be all disposed of in a red colored bag, which will later be incinerated.
- Yellow Bag – All dressings, bandages and cotton swabs with body fluids, blood bags, human anatomical waste, body parts are to be discarded in yellow bags.
- Cardboard box with blue marking – Glass vials, ampules, other glassware is to be discarded in a cardboard box with a blue marking/sticker.
- White Puncture Proof Container (PPC) – Needles, sharps, blades are disposed of in a white translucent puncture proof container.
- Black Bags – These are to be used for non-bio-medical waste. In a hospital setup, this includes stationery, vegetable and fruit peels, leftovers, packaging including that from medicines, disposable caps, disposable masks, disposable shoe-covers, disposable tea cups, cartons, sweeping dust, kitchen waste etc.

== Environmental impacts ==
=== The syringe tide environmental disaster ===
The syringe tide environmental disaster of 1987–1988 raised awareness about medical waste as medical syringes washed ashore in Connecticut, New Jersey, and New York. The syringes endangered marine species and posed a threat to humans who visited the beach. The crises spurred scientists and lawmakers to create mechanisms, policies, and laws so that health care providers would process their bio-waste in an environmentally friendly way.

=== Effects of medical waste on the environment ===
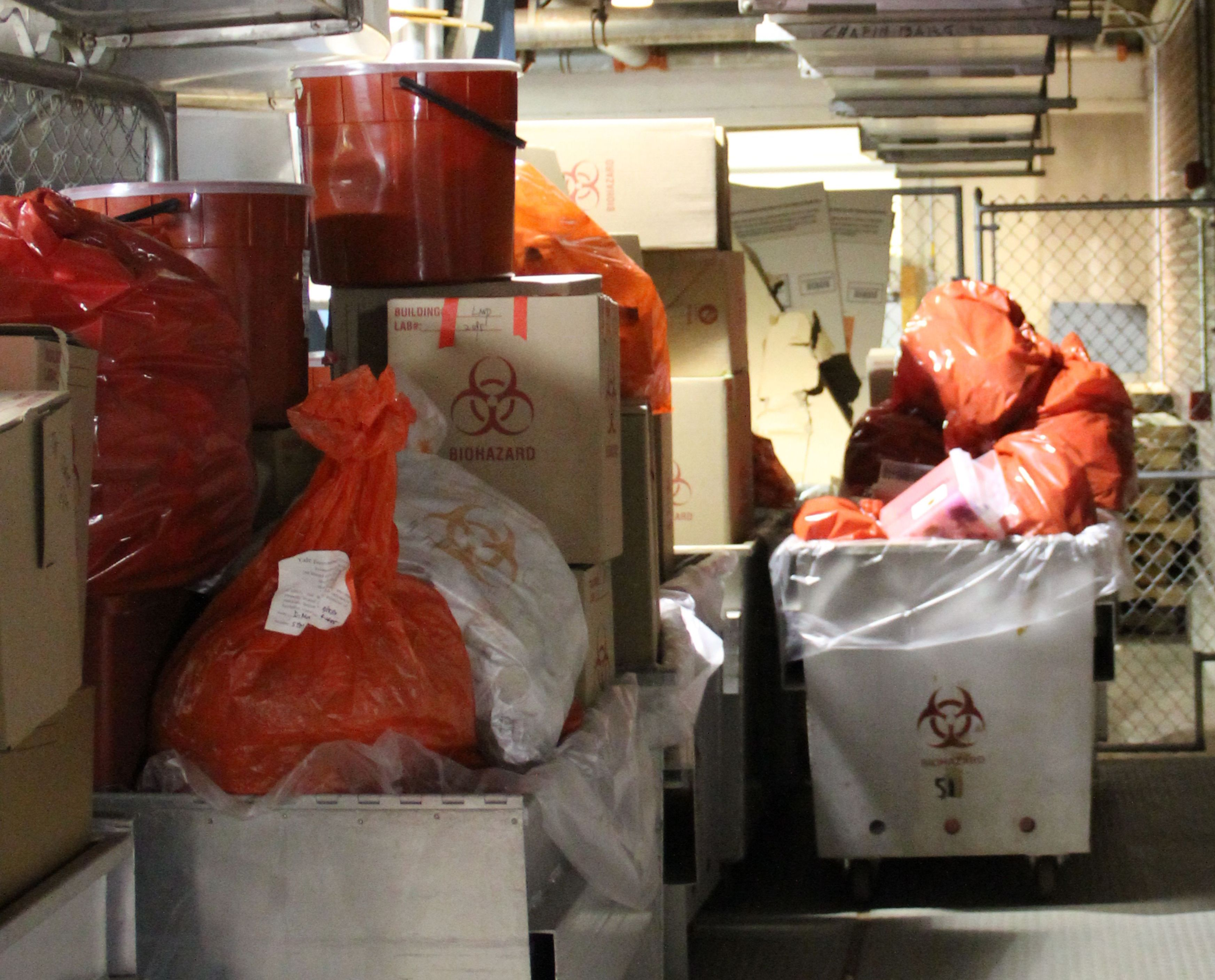
Accumulation of biomedical waste in a hospital basement

Improper management of health care waste can have both direct and indirect health consequences for health personnel, community members and on the environment. Indirect consequences in the form of toxic emissions from inadequate burning of medical waste, or the production of millions of used syringes in a period of three to four weeks from an insufficiently well planned mass immunization campaign.

Biomedical waste is not limited to medical instruments; it includes medicine, waste stored in red biohazard bags, and materials used for patient care, such as cotton and bandaids. The most serious effect that biomedical waste has on our seas is the discharge of poisons into the waters that could then be consumed by ocean life creatures. Toxins would interject into the food chain and eventually reach humans who consume sea creatures. Human exposure to such toxins can stunt human growth development and cause birth defects.

The high volume of plastic use in the medical field also poses a dangerous threat to the environment. According to North and Halden, 85% of disposable plastic materials make up all medical equipment. Our current reliance on plastic materials is rooted in their unique capabilities to be lightweight, cost-effective, and durable while preserving the sterility of medical equipment. In addition to the serious health implications of releasing harmful toxins in the environment from medical waste deposits, introducing this volume of single-use plastics can catalyze the compounding health detriments caused by macro and microplastics.

=== Incineration of biomedical waste ===
==== Methods of biomedical waste incineration ====
The three type of medical waste incinerators are controlled air, excess air, and rotary kiln. Controlled air is also known as starved-air incineration, two-stage incineration, or modular combustion. This is the process of which waste is fed to a combustion chamber and combustion air begins to dry and facilitates volatilization of the waste. As a result, carbon dioxide and other excess gases are released into the atmosphere.

The second type of incineration is the excess air process. This is similar to the controlled air process, such as the waste being dried, ignited, and combusted by heat provided by the primary chamber burner. However, the main difference is that moisture and volatile components in the waste are vaporized.

In a rotary kiln, the process is similar to the two mention above, however, it is more versatile in terms of being able to mix wet and dry waste components and viewed by many waste engineers as being the most environmentally friendly.

==== Impact on the environment ====
Post incineration process, toxic ash residue is produced and is often disposed at landfills. These landfills are not protected by any barrier and the residue has the potential of reaching underground water that is often exposed to human use. The combustion of plastic material releases toxic gases that escapes and joins breathable air. Human and animal exposure to such gases can cause long term breathing and health issues. The rotation of toxic air does not only impact human well-being, but also of animals and plants. Air pollution caused by the incinerators depletes the ozone layer, causes crop and forest damage, and increases the effects of climate change. Constant exposure to such toxins and chemicals in the air could be deemed detrimental to trees and plants and could eventually lead to extinction of certain plants in specific areas. Pollution and chemical leaks also affect the fruits of trees and would cause them to be poisonous and therefore inedible.

=== Environmental waste in California ===
==== Medical waste management program ====
California created the Medical Waste Management Program, which regulates the generation, handling, storage, treatment, and disposal of medical waste by providing oversight for the implementation of the Medical Waste Management Act. Precautions have been taken in California which permits and inspects all medical waste offsite treatment facilities and medical waste transfer stations. In order to dispose waste, the department recommends the following process to make controlled substance waste non-retrievable. Pills containing a controlled substance are crushed before placing the residue into a pharmaceutical waste container. Controlled substance that is remaining in a syringe is wasted into a pharmaceutical waste container before disposing of the syringe in a sharps container. Expired medications should be returned through a reverse distributor.

=== Environmentally friendly alternatives ===
Reusable RMW or sharps containers reduce the amount of plastic sent to landfills and CO_{2} emissions.

Non-incineration treatment includes four basic processes: thermal, chemical, irradiative, and biological. The main purpose of the treatment technology is to decontaminate waste by destroying pathogens. Modern technology invented mechanics that would allow medical professionals and hospitals to dispose medical waste in an environmentally friendly way, such as autoclaving, plasma pyrolysis, gasification, chemical methods, and microwave irradiation. These alternatives are also highly versatile and can be used for all different types of waste.

An autoclave, similar to a pressure cooker, uses high-temperature steam to penetrate waste material and kill micro-organisms. Autoclave treatment has been recommended for microbiology and biotechnology waste, waste sharps, soiled and solid wastes. Microwave irradiation is based on the principle of generation of high-frequency waves. These waves cause the particles within the waste material to vibrate, generating heat and killing the pathogens from within. A simple yet effective method is chemical disinfection: 1% hypochlorite can kill thriving bacteria. Plasma pyrolysis is an environment-friendly mechanism, which converts organic waste into commercially useful byproducts. The intense heat generated by the plasma enables it to dispose all types of waste including municipal solid waste, biomedical waste and hazardous waste in a safe and reliable manner. Gasification can offer carbon sequestration and energy generation, reducing the carbon footprint of biomedical waste treatment. Additionally, to further minimize the carbon footprint of medical waste, especially in ORs, one-time use instruments can be replaced with reusable ones like ports, graspers, forceps, suction and irrigation tools, basic open instruments, and more.

=== Other possible solutions ===
Significant strides may be made relatively quickly if the focus shifts towards surgical subspecialties and their involvement in generated medical waste. Surgical specialties in particular have focused on infection control and thus have implemented single-use operative tools in their practices. One example of this can be seen within the practice of gastroenterology, where each endoscopy alone in the U.S. generates approximately 2.1 kg of disposable waste, of which 64% of the waste ended up in landfills. Thankfully, it appears that surgeons across the U.S. have agreed that their practice generates a high amount of waste and that a change needs to be implemented. A multi-center survey of 219 U.S. surgeons showed that 90% of them agreed strongly that waste of sterile surgical items is an issue and moreover, 95% of them agreed to a willingness to change their operating room workflow to reduce waste. Another focus that proves to be effective is reform around the policies that surround "red bag waste." Separation of medical waste is typically done via these bags and a narrative review out of U.S. operating rooms found that 90% of red bag waste, or the items found in the red waste bags, did not actually meet the criteria for pathologic or infectious waste.

Initiative from corporations and hospitals is essential to creating a healthier environment, however, there are various methods in which involves action from the general population and would contribute to a clean air environment. By creating surveillance groups within hospitals, everyone would be held accountable for misconduct and improper disposal of waste. Consequences could be implemented where individuals would be required to pay a fine, or face unpaid suspension from work. Companies and governmental organization should also initiate non-routine checkups and searches, this would place pressure on hospitals to ensure that waste is properly disposed all year round. Voluntary clean-ups would involve hospital staff in assuring that medical waste is not littered around the hospital or thrown into regular garbage bins.

Because hospitals, specifically ORs, generate the most medical waste in the healthcare industry, it is crucial for ORs to work towards developing sustainable initiatives. Items used in the operating room that cannot be reused in subsequent surgeries can be repurposed through donations to the community. For example, plastic trays and surgical gowns can be given to art classes, towels to cleaning initiatives, and foam packing to moving companies. Repurposing was taken to the next level by a warehouse called Donations In Kind, run by the Rotary Club, as it takes in repurposed medical supplies from ORs to provide support for hospitals and communities in developing nations. This warehouse is just one of 24 taking on this initiative.

== See also ==
- Drug disposal – Safe disposal of unused drugs
- Electronic waste – Discarded electronic devices
- Human waste – Feces and urine
- List of waste management topics
- List of waste types
- Incineration – Waste treatment process
- Universal precautions – Medical standard for contact avoidance
