= Shred-it =

Document destruction company

- Industry: Information Security
- Headquarters: Bannockburn, Illinois, USA
- Area served: U.S., Canada, Ireland, the Netherlands, Spain, the United Kingdom, Australia, Austria, Belgium, France, Germany, Luxembourg, Singapore and the United Arab Emirates.
- Services: Paper shredding and Hard drive destruction
- Number of employees: 5,000+
- Website: https://www.shredit.com

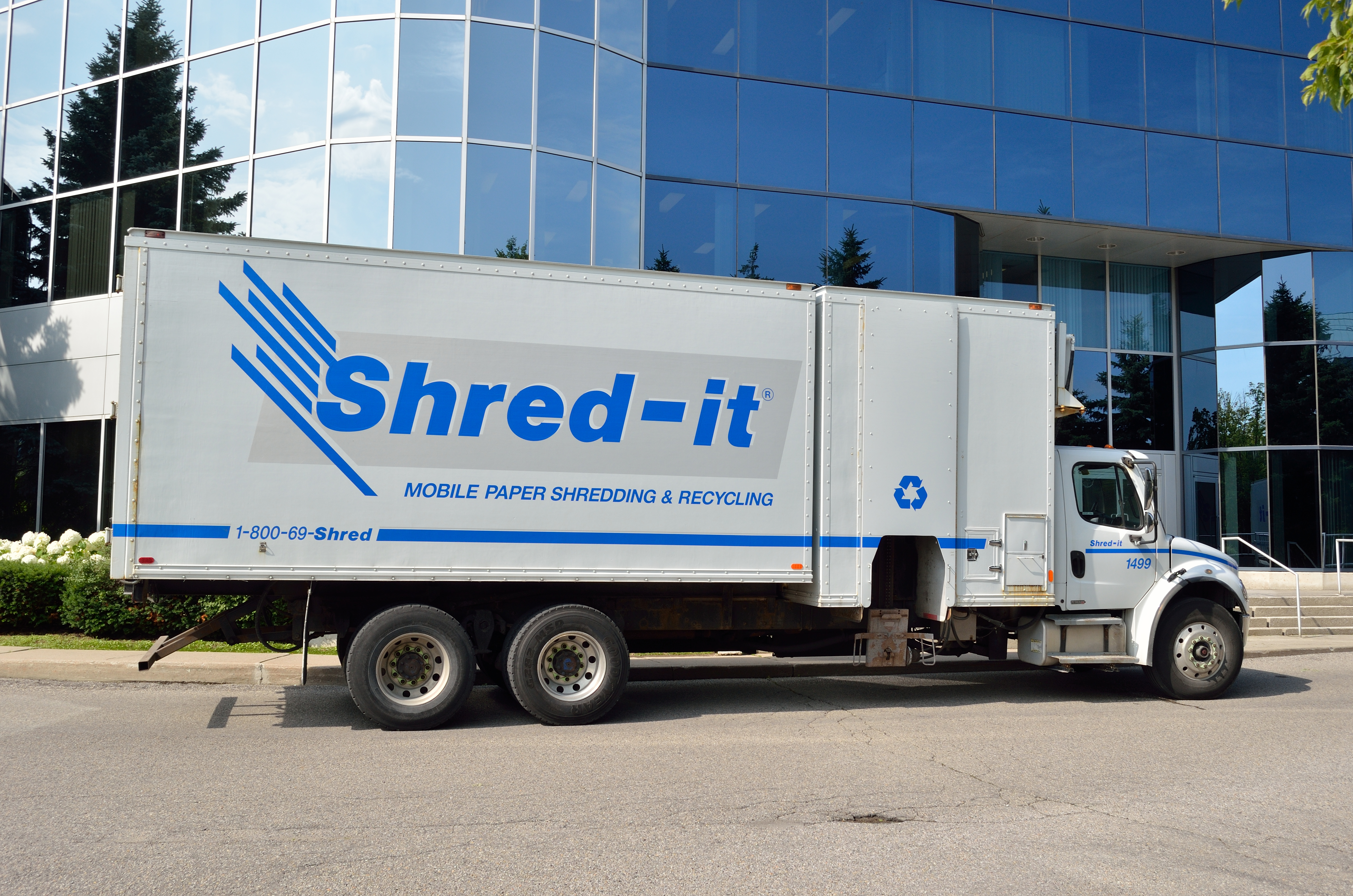
Shred-it truck in Ontario

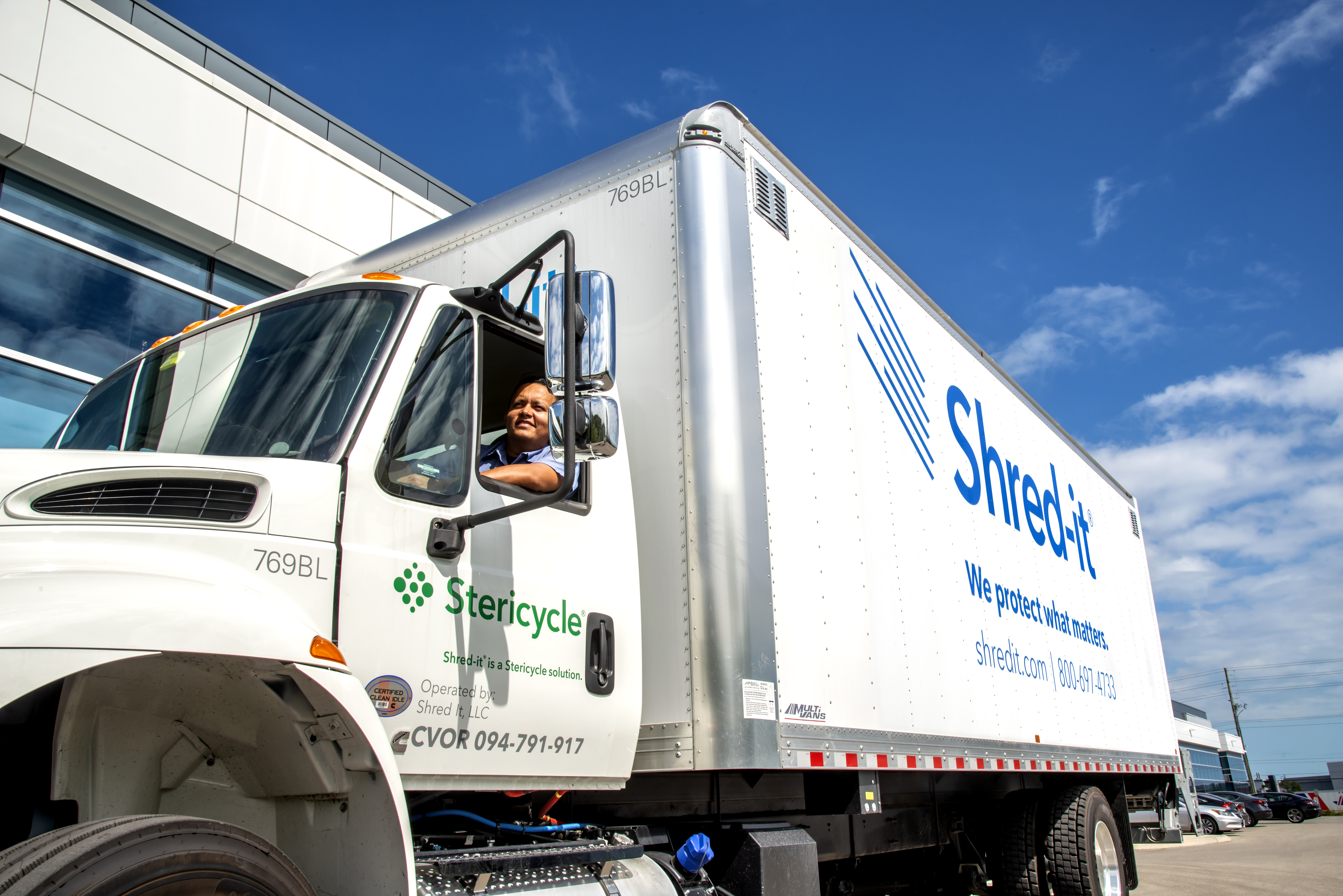
Shred-it service truck in 2018

Shred-it is an information security solution provided by Stericycle Inc. Its services include document destruction, hard drive destruction, and specialty item shredding. The company is also known for its Annual Data Protection Report commissioned with Ipsos, a yearly survey of small business owners, C-level executives and consumers focusing on data protection and information security.

== History ==
Greg Brophy founded Shred-it in 1988 and incorporated the company in 1989. In 1993, Brophy expanded the business by launching a manufacturing division called Securit Manufacturing Solutions "SMS". Today, SMS manufactures security consoles and specialty shredding trucks for all Shred-it's branches. It also sells industrial shredding equipment to other secure information destruction businesses.

In 2014, Shred-it merged with Cintas Document Shredding, which now operates under the Shred-it name.

In 2015, Stericycle acquired Shred-it and began positioning the company as one of its many waste management and compliance services.

== Secure Information Destruction Services ==
=== Document Destruction ===
Shred-it offers document destruction services where paper documents are shredded using industrial paper shredders. This service is offered on a one-time or on a recurring basis.

Shred-it maintains a fleet of trucks that can provide this service on-site or deliver materials to Shred-it's facilities for destruction. The trucks are prominently featured at Community Shred-it events, where Shred-it partners with organizations like Crime Stoppers, to raise awareness about identity theft and fraud, while providing a safe way to dispose of documents with confidential information. Shred-it provides a custom quote for every document destruction job and ensures all paper waste is recycled.

=== Hard Drive, Digital Media, and Specialty Item Destruction ===
Shred-it provides secure information destruction for hard drives and digital media. Deliberately damaging these devices is the only way to ensure confidential information can no longer be retrieved. Shred-it has two methods for securely destroying digital information. Shearing slices hard drives into minuscule pieces using 40,000 lbs of combined force while crushing uses 7,500 lbs of force pressure to drill irreparable holes in the hard drive, so information can never be recovered.

The company also offers specialty item shredding, which involves destruction of any item that poses a threat to a business’ reputation or security. Shred-it's specialty item services dispose of items, like uniforms to casino chips, ID badges, prototypes, pill bottles, or material with outdated branding.
